= Sebastian Vettel =

German racing driver (born 1987)

- Vettel at the 2026 Italian Grand Prix
- Born: 3 July 1987 (age 39); Heppenheim, Hesse, West Germany
- Spouse: Hanna Prater (m. 2019)
- Children: 3
- Relatives: Fabian Vettel (brother)

Formula One World Championship career
- Nationality: (Germany) German
- Active years: 2007–2022
- Team(s): BMW Sauber, Toro Rosso, Red Bull, Ferrari, Aston Martin
- Car number: 5; 1 (2014) (Note: Vettel competed using the number 1 during his World Drivers' Championship defence in 2014.)
- Entries: 300 (299 starts)
- Championships: 4 (2010, 2011, 2012, 2013)
- Wins: 53
- Podiums: 122
- Career points: 3098
- Pole positions: 57
- Fastest laps: 38
- First entry: 2007 United States Grand Prix
- First win: 2008 Italian Grand Prix
- Last win: 2019 Singapore Grand Prix
- Last entry: 2022 Abu Dhabi Grand Prix

Previous series
- 2006–2007; 2005–2006; 2003–2004: Formula Renault 3.5; F3 Euro Series; Formula BMW ADAC

Championship titles
- 2004: Formula BMW ADAC
Medal record
Motor racing
Representing Germany
Race of Champions
Winner	2007 London	Team
Winner	2008 London	Team
Winner	2009 Beijing	Team
Winner	2010 Düsseldorf	Team
Winner	2011 Düsseldorf	Team
Winner	2012 Bangkok	Team
Winner	2015 London	Individual
Winner	2017 Miami	Team
Runner-up	2022 Piteå	Individual
Gold medal – first place	2019 Mexico City	Skills
- Website: sebastianvettel.de

Sebastian Vettel (German pronunciation: [zeˈbasti̯a(ː)n ˈfɛtl̩]; born 3 July 1987) is a German former racing driver who competed in Formula One from 2007 to 2022. Vettel won four Formula One World Drivers' Championship titles, which he won consecutively from 2010 to 2013 with Red Bull, and won 53 Grands Prix across 16 seasons.

Born and raised in Heppenheim, Vettel began competitive kart racing aged eight. After a successful karting career leading to his victory at the junior European Championship in 2001, Vettel graduated to junior formulae. He started his career in Formula BMW ADAC, dominating the championship in 2004 with 18 wins from 20 races. Vettel then progressed to the Formula 3 Euro Series in 2005, taking several victories and finishing runner-up to Paul di Resta the following season. A test driver for BMW Sauber since 2006, Vettel made his Formula One debut at the 2007 United States Grand Prix. Vettel replaced Scott Speed at Toro Rosso after the European Grand Prix for the remainder of the 2007 season, as part of the Red Bull Junior Team. Retaining his seat for 2008, Vettel achieved his maiden pole position and victory at the Italian Grand Prix to become the then-youngest driver to win a Formula One Grand Prix. Vettel was promoted to parent team Red Bull in 2009, taking several wins as he finished runner-up to Jenson Button in the World Drivers' Championship.

After winning the title-deciding Abu Dhabi Grand Prix in 2010, Vettel became the then-youngest Formula One World Drivers' Champion, aged 23. He won his second championship in 2011, becoming the youngest back-to-back World Champion to date, and won his third in 2012, after a close title battle with Fernando Alonso. Vettel set several records in 2013, winning 13 Grands Prix—including a then-record nine consecutive victories—to claim his fourth consecutive title with Red Bull. After a winless 2014 campaign, Vettel signed for Ferrari, replacing Alonso to partner Kimi Räikkönen; he took several wins in his debut season, finishing third in the standings. Following another winless season in 2016, Vettel emerged as the closest challenger to Mercedes and Lewis Hamilton, finishing runner-up in 2017 and 2018 after achieving several victories across both campaigns. Partnered by Charles Leclerc for 2019, Vettel took the final win of his career at the Singapore Grand Prix before leaving Ferrari at the end of the 2020 season. Vettel joined the recently established Aston Martin in 2021, where he scored his final podium finish at the Azerbaijan Grand Prix.

Vettel retired at the end of the 2022 season, having achieved the fourth-most wins (53), fourth-most pole positions (57), fifth-most fastest laps (38), and fourth-most podium finishes (122) in Formula One. He won the Race of Champions in 2015, further winning the Nations' Cup six consecutive times from 2007 to 2012, representing Germany alongside Michael Schumacher. Vettel is also a prominent environmental and climate activist; since 2023, he has been co-owner of the Germany SailGP Team.

== Early life ==
Vettel was born on 3 July 1987 in Heppenheim, West Germany, to Norbert and Heike Vettel. He has one younger brother, Fabian, a racing driver, and two older sisters: Melanie, a dental technician, and Stefanie, a physiotherapist for children with disabilities. Vettel suggested in an interview that he was "terrible" at school, but he passed his Abitur at Heppenheim's Starkenburg-Gymnasium with a respectable grade. His childhood heroes were "The three Michaels": Michael Schumacher, Michael Jordan and Michael Jackson. He mentioned that he wanted to be a singer like Jackson, but realised that he did not have the voice. Vettel is also a fan of the Beatles, collecting several records, including Abbey Road and his favourite song being "Drive My Car". In an interview on Top Gear, he stated that he is a fan of British comedy such as Little Britain and Monty Python's Life of Brian.

== Junior racing career ==
=== Karting (1995–2002) ===
Vettel began karting at the age of three, and began racing in karts series in 1995 at the age of eight. He was accepted into the Red Bull Junior Team in 1998, and won various titles, such as the Junior Monaco Kart Cup in 2001.

=== Lower formulae (2003–2007) ===
==== 2003–2004: Formula BMW ====
Vettel was promoted to open-wheel cars in 2003, and was given a chance by Derrick Walker to test a Reynard Motorsport Champ Car in a two-day private test at the Homestead–Miami Speedway. A year later, he won the 2004 Formula BMW ADAC championship with 18 victories from 20 races.

==== 2005–2007: Formula Three and Formula Renault ====
Vettel drove for ASL Mücke Motorsport in the 2005 Formula 3 Euro Series. He was placed fifth in the final standings with 63 points and won the Rookie Cup. He tested for the Williams Formula One team later that year as a reward for his Formula BMW success. Vettel then went on to test for the BMW Sauber Formula One team.

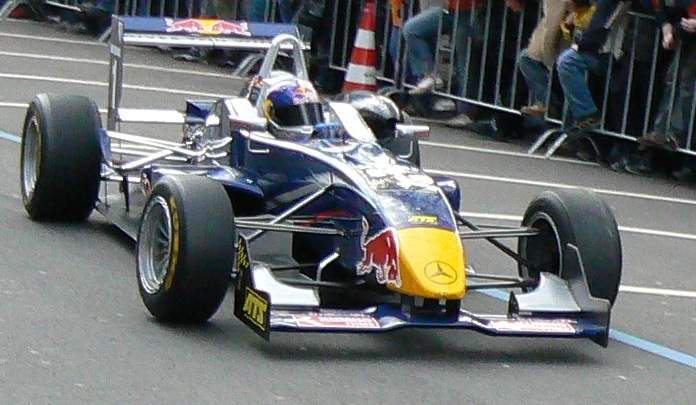
Vettel came second in the 2006 Formula 3 Euro Series.

Vettel was promoted to test driver for BMW Sauber in 2006, and participated in the 2006 Formula 3 Euro Series, finishing as runner-up. He also competed in the 2006 Formula Renault 3.5 Series, where he finished first and second at Misano in his first two races. In the next round at Spa-Francorchamps, his finger was almost sliced off by flying debris following an accident, and he was expected to be out for several weeks. Nevertheless, he managed to compete in the 2006 Masters of Formula 3 at Zandvoort the following weekend, where he finished in sixth place.

Vettel competed in the 2007 Formula Renault 3.5 Series, and took his first win at the Nürburgring. He led the championship when he was called up permanently by the BMW Sauber Formula One team.

== Formula One career ==
=== BMW Sauber reserve driver (2006–2007) ===
==== 2006: Test debut ====
Vettel became BMW Sauber's third driver at the 2006 Turkish Grand Prix, when former incumbent Robert Kubica replaced Jacques Villeneuve as second driver for the 2006 Hungarian Grand Prix. On his testing debut, Vettel set the fastest time in the second Friday free practice. Vettel became the then-youngest Formula One driver to participate in a Grand Prix weekend at 19 years and 53 days. He also set a record for the shortest time before first career fine, collecting his first fine in nine seconds by exceeding the pitlane speed limit on the way to the track. In his second testing session at the 2006 Italian Grand Prix, he set the fastest time in both Friday practice sessions.

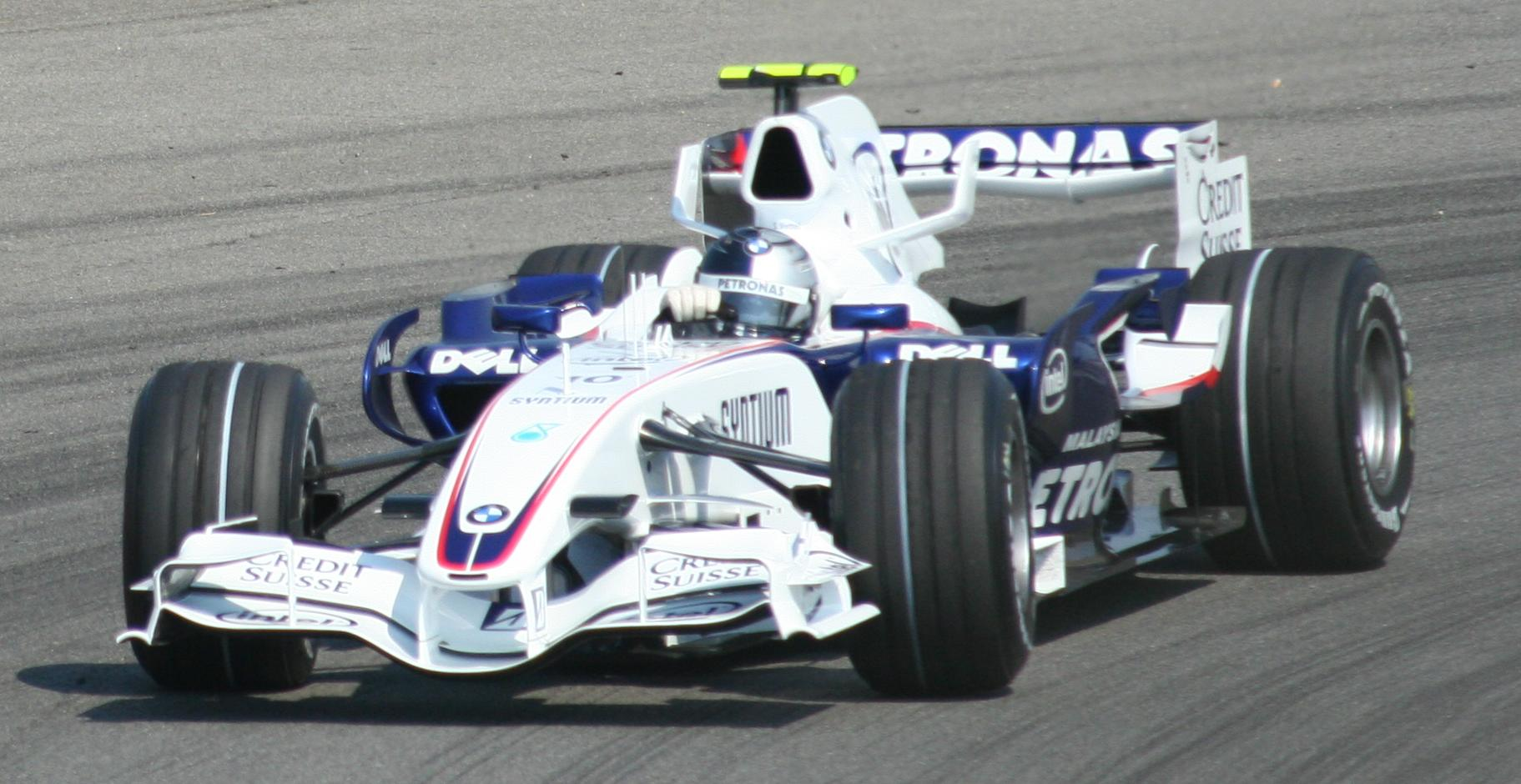
Vettel made his Formula One race debut at the 2007 United States Grand Prix.

==== 2007: Race debut ====
Vettel was confirmed as BMW's test driver for 2007. Following Kubica's crash at the 2007 Canadian Grand Prix, Vettel was named his replacement at the 2007 United States Grand Prix. He started in seventh position and finished in eighth to become the then-youngest driver to score a point in Formula One.

=== Toro Rosso (2007–2008) ===
==== 2007–2008: Maiden race win and rise to prominence ====
BMW released him in July 2007 to join Red Bull's Scuderia Toro Rosso, replacing Scott Speed from the 2007 Hungarian Grand Prix onwards, as Vettel was already under contract to Red Bull Racing. It was also announced that he would drive for Toro Rosso in 2008 alongside Sébastien Bourdais.

In the rain-affected Japanese Grand Prix at Fuji, Vettel worked his way up to third, behind Lewis Hamilton and Red Bull Racing's Mark Webber, and seemed to be on course for his and the team's maiden podium finish. However, Vettel crashed into Webber under safety car conditions, forcing both cars to retire. Webber said after the race: "It's kids isn't it. Kids with not enough experience – you do a good job and then they fuck it all up". Vettel was initially punished with a ten-place grid penalty for the following race, but this was lifted after a spectator video on YouTube showed the incident may have been caused by Hamilton's behaviour behind the safety car.

Vettel finished a career-best fourth a week later at the Chinese Grand Prix, having started 17th on the grid while in mixed conditions. He was tipped by Red Bull owner Dietrich Mateschitz as one of the sport's big future stars: "Vettel is one of the young guys with extraordinary potential [...] He is fast, he is intelligent, and he is very interested in the technical side."

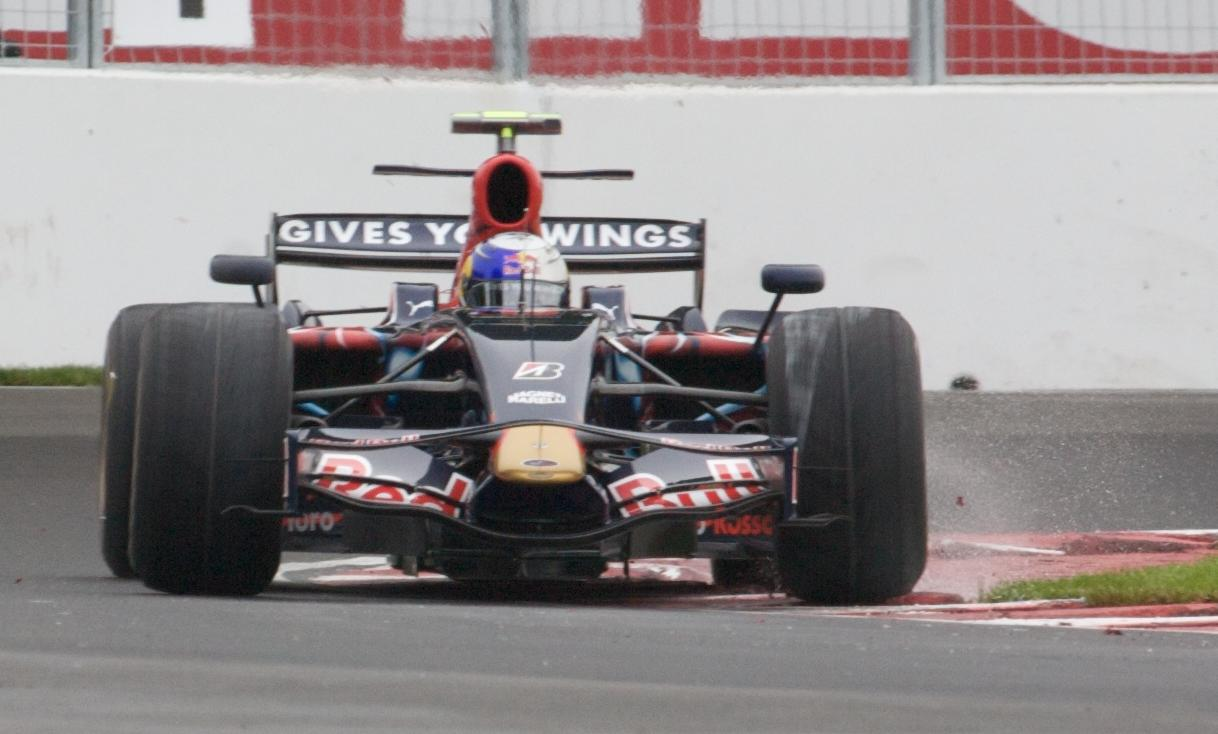
Vettel scored Toro Rosso's only race win, only pole position and first podium at the 2008 Italian Grand Prix.

After four races of the 2008 season, Vettel was the only driver to have failed to finish a single race, having retired on the first lap in three of them. At the Monaco Grand Prix, Vettel scored his first points of the season with a fifth-place finish, after qualifying 17th. Toro Rosso's technical director Giorgio Ascanelli explained that something changed at the European Grand Prix in Valencia: "Suddenly Vettel understood something about how to drive an F1 car quickly. It made a huge difference – not only to the speed he could unlock but also to his ability to do so consistently."

At the wet Italian Grand Prix, Vettel became the youngest driver in history to win a Formula One Grand Prix, aged 21 years and 74 days. He led for the majority of the Grand Prix and crossed the finish line 12.5 seconds ahead of McLaren's Heikki Kovalainen. It would also be Toro Rosso's only win. Earlier in the weekend, he had already become the youngest pole-sitter. Toro Rosso team boss Gerhard Berger said: "As he proved today, he can win races, but he's going to win World Championships. He's a cool guy". His victory led the German media to dub him "Baby Schumi".

Vettel was named 2008 Rookie of the Year at the Autosport Awards.

=== Red Bull (2009–2014) ===
==== 2009: Championship contender ====
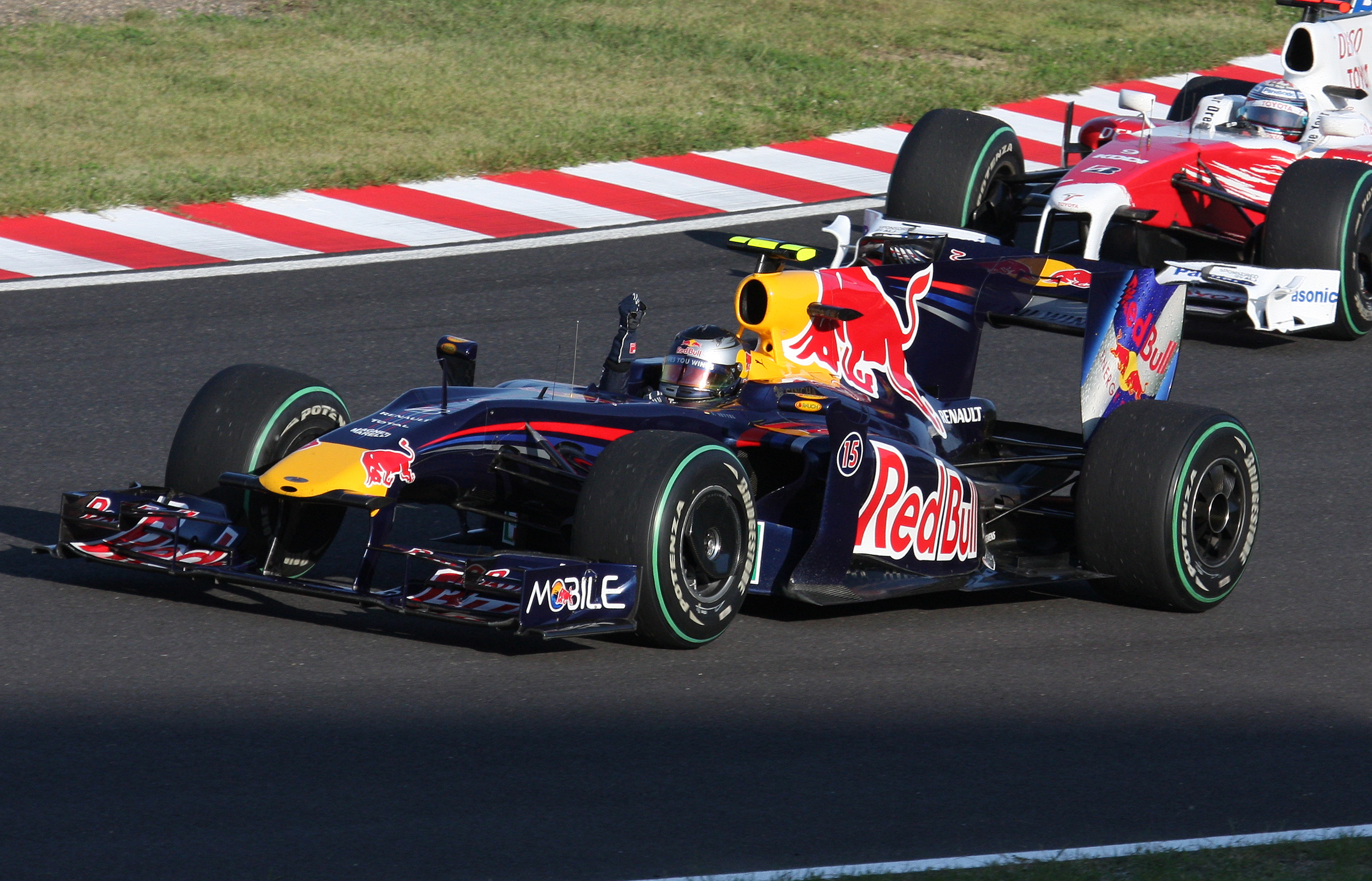
Vettel quickly became a championship contender after being promoted to Red Bull Racing in 2009.

At the start of the 2009 season, Vettel replaced the retired David Coulthard at Red Bull Racing. He began strongly at the Australian Grand Prix, running in second for the majority of the race. However, a clash with Robert Kubica over second place in the latter stages forced both to retire. He went on to take pole position and the race win at Chinese Grand Prix; Red Bull Racing's maiden pole and win.

Further wins followed in Great Britain, Japan and Abu Dhabi. He won the Japanese Grand Prix from pole position, leading every lap. Vettel won the inaugural Abu Dhabi Grand Prix, the first ever day-night race, to finish second in the World Drivers' Championship standings behind Jenson Button. He also scored his third fastest lap of the year, drawing him level with teammate Mark Webber. However, as Vettel had more second fastest laps, he won the 2009 DHL Fastest Lap Award.

==== 2010: First World Championship ====
Vettel took the first pole position of the 2010 season at the Bahrain Grand Prix. He led most of the race but as a result of a spark plug failure, Vettel finished in fourth place. At the Australian Grand Prix, Vettel was appointed as a director of the Grand Prix Drivers' Association. He took his first win of the season in Malaysia.

In Monaco, Vettel made it a Red Bull 1–2 with him second and Webber first. Both were equal on points in the standings, with Webber first based on total wins. At the Turkish Grand Prix, Vettel was running second behind Webber when he made a passing move on his teammate. The two collided, putting Vettel out of the race, with neither driver accepting responsibility for the collision.

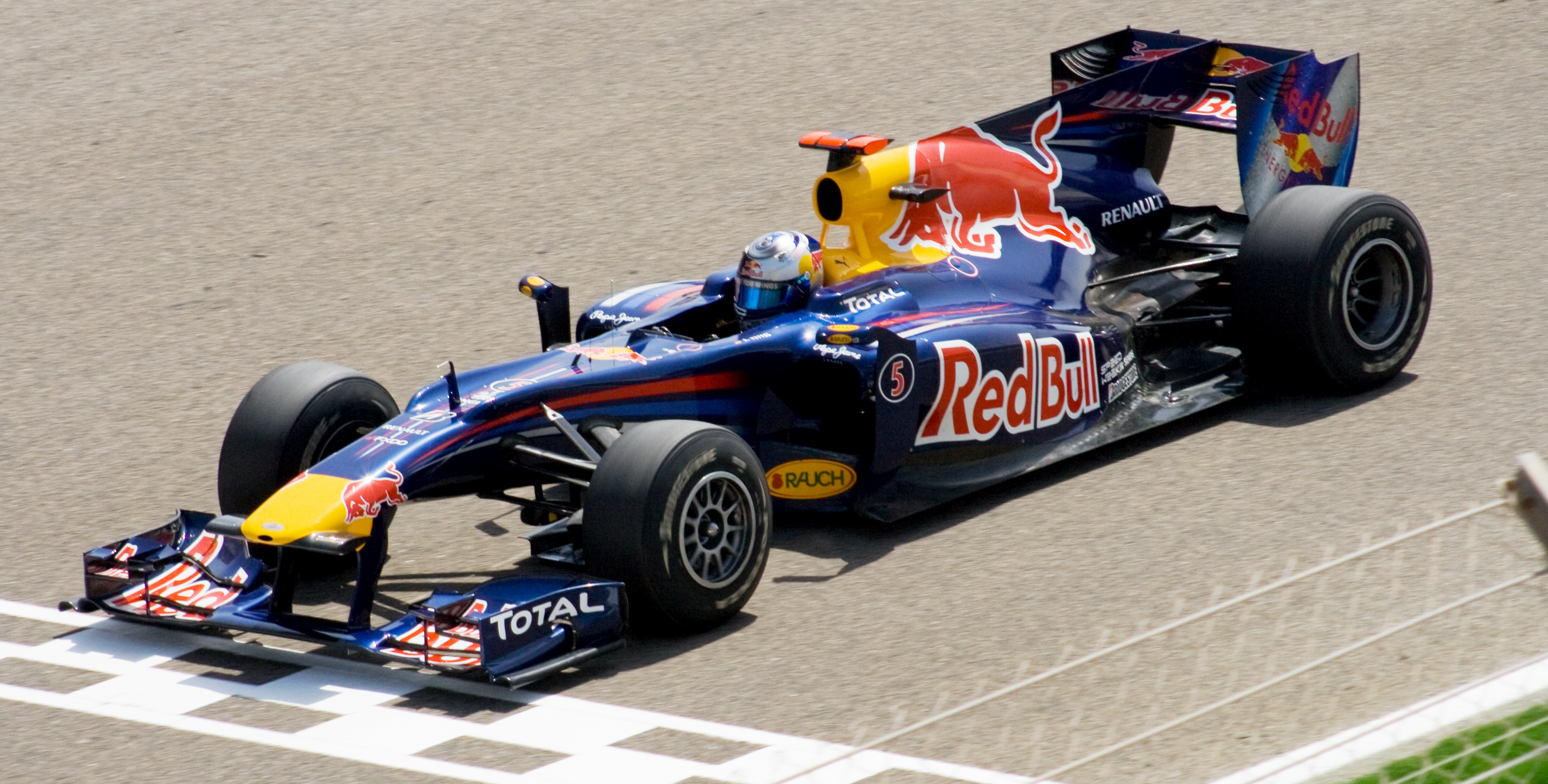
Vettel became the then youngest World Drivers' Champion after winning the 2010 Abu Dhabi Grand Prix, a record he held until 2026.

At the British Grand Prix, both Vettel and Webber's cars were fitted with a new front wing design. Vettel's wing was damaged in the third practice session, and Webber's sole surviving example was removed and given to his teammate. Vettel qualified in first place, but suffered a puncture. He finished seventh while Webber took the victory. In Japan, he qualified on pole ahead of Webber and went on to win with a lights-to-flag victory. Aged 23 years and 98 days, Vettel became the youngest Grand Prix driver to win at the same track on two occasions. At the inaugural Korean Grand Prix, Vettel led the first 45 laps before retiring with engine failure, handing victory to championship rival Fernando Alonso.

With the 1–2 finish at the Brazilian Grand Prix, Vettel and Webber secured Red Bull Racing's first World Constructors' Championship. Vettel went into the final race of the season in Abu Dhabi with a 15-point deficit to Alonso and a 7-point gap to Webber. He won the Grand Prix from pole to become the youngest World Drivers' Champion in the sport's history at the time, as Alonso only finished in seventh place. Following John Surtees in the 1964 season and James Hunt in 1976, this was the third time in Formula One history that the title winner had not topped the championship table until after the last race.

==== 2011: Youngest back-to-back World Champion ====
Vettel started the 2011 season with wins in Australia and Malaysia, before a second-place finish at the Chinese Grand Prix due to poor tyre management, possibly related to his inability to properly communicate with his team, as his radio was broken. In Monaco, Vettel led the race but due to another radio malfunction, the Red Bull pit crew was not prepared when he came in. The pit stop was slow and he was sent out on the wrong tyres, handing the lead to Button. Vettel switched to a one-stop strategy and stuck with one set of soft tyres for 56 laps. He was caught by Alonso and Button as his tyres deteriorated, but neither were able to pass him. The race was red-flagged with few laps remaining, which allowed teams to change their tyres; when the race was restarted under the safety car, Vettel was able to retain the lead and win.

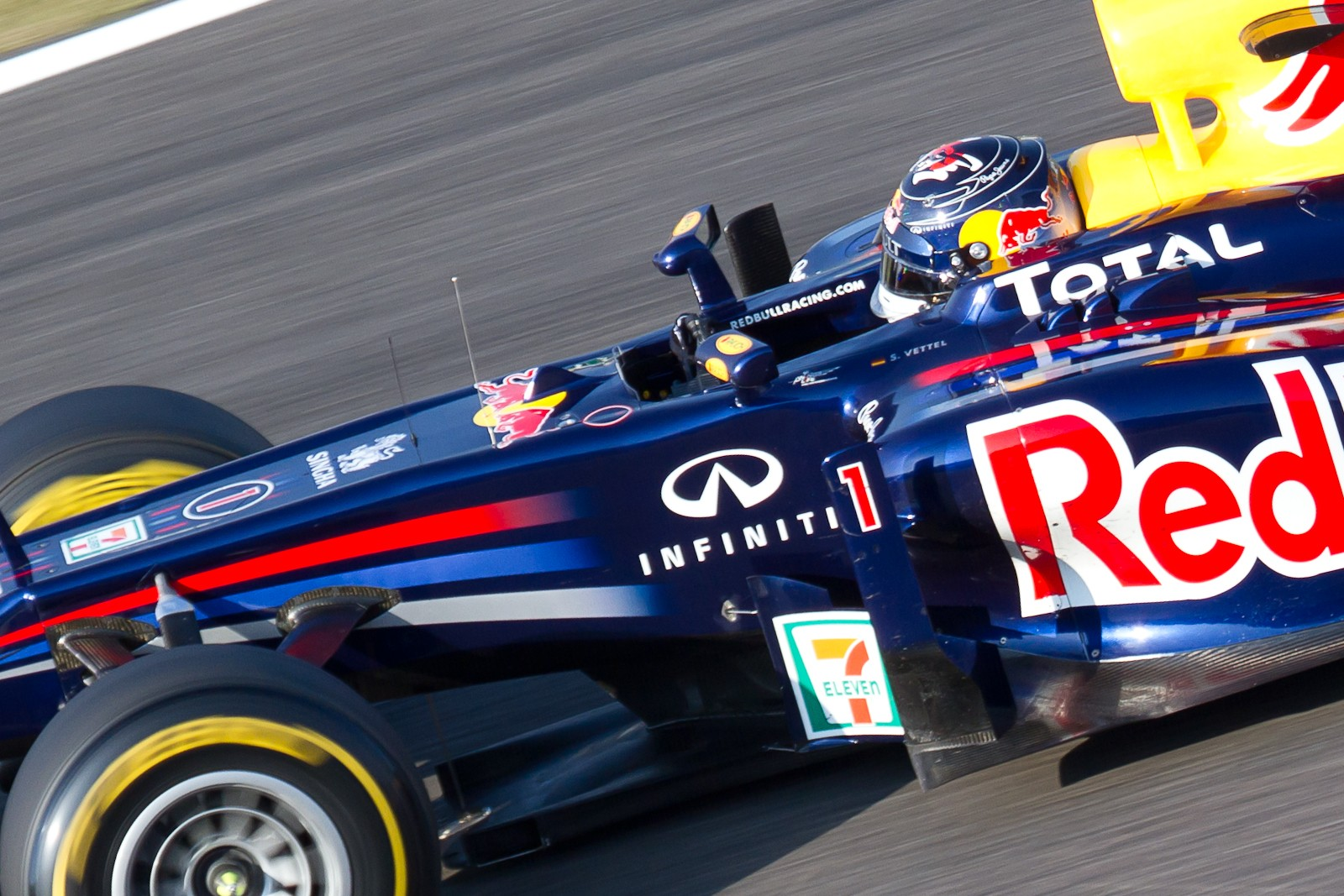
Vettel became the youngest two-time World Driver' Champion in 2011, clinching the title at the Japanese Grand Prix with four races remaining.

At the European Grand Prix, the Fédération Internationale de l'Automobile (FIA) enforced a ban on engine mappings. It was believed by some in the press that this was an attempt by the FIA to thwart Vettel's early domination. Nevertheless, he took pole with the fastest qualifying lap in Valencia Street Circuit's history. Vettel dominated with his first hat-trick of 2011, and won his sixth race out of eight. The FIA implemented another rule change at the British Grand Prix, targeting the blown diffusers. Red Bull believed the changes would cost them about half a second per lap. During the race, Vettel held off Webber for second place, who ignored a radio message from team principal Christian Horner to hold position. It was only the second time in the sport's history that a driver had finished second or higher in each of the first nine races of a season and won at least six of them.

Vettel's run of fourteen successive front-row starts and eleven successive top two finishes ended at his home race, where he qualified third and finished fourth. In Italy, he took his tenth pole position of the year, in which he joined Ayrton Senna as the only driver to have taken ten pole positions in two separate seasons. A podium finish in Japan secured his second successive title with four races remaining, making him the youngest ever double and back-to-back champion. Vettel won the following race in Korea to become the second driver to take at least ten wins in a season after Michael Schumacher. He also helped to secure Red Bull's second successive World Constructors' Championship. Vettel took his eleventh victory of the season in the inaugural Indian Grand Prix, leading every lap from pole position, as well as setting the race's fastest lap to claim his first grand slam. Vettel broke the record for the most pole positions in a season at the season finale in Brazil, after he clinched his 15th pole of the year. He completed the year with 15 poles, 11 victories, and 17 podiums from 19 races; Vettel also earned a record total of 392 points.

==== 2012: Triple World Champion following Alonso title duel ====
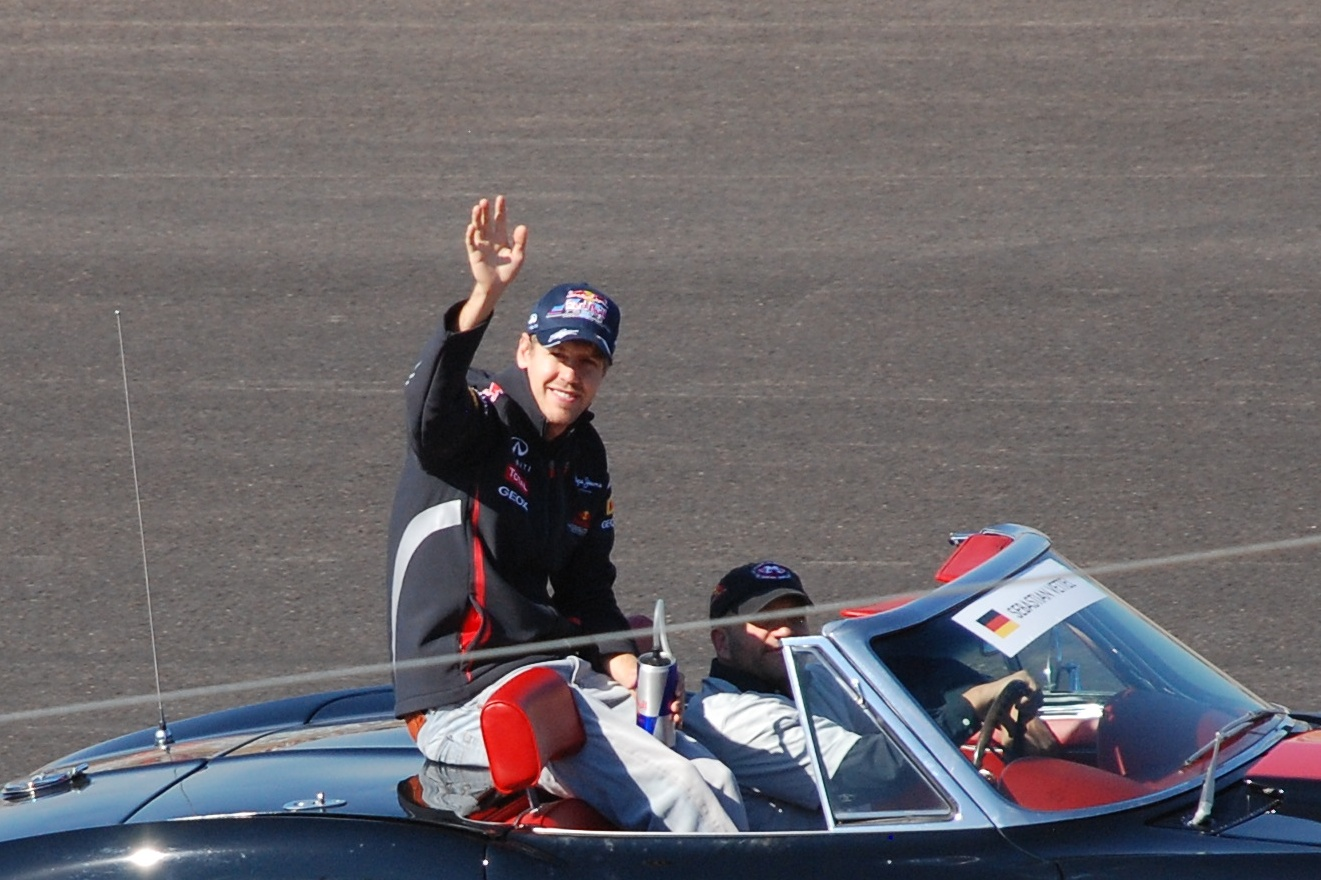
Vettel at the 2012 United States Grand Prix

Vettel started the 2012 season with a second place at the Australian Grand Prix, before he finished outside the points in Malaysia following a collision with backmarker Narain Karthikeyan. Vettel and Horner criticised Karthikeyan's driving, with Vettel calling him an "idiot", and a "cucumber". Karthikeyan hit back, calling Vettel a "cry baby". Vettel crossed the line in first place at the Bahrain Grand Prix to go top of the championship standings. Three races without a podium place followed, before he retired at the European Grand Prix after an alternator failure, dropping him to fourth in the standings. In Germany, Vettel finished second behind Alonso but received a 20-second time penalty after the race, as he was off the track when he overtook Button; Vettel dropped back to fifth. He started in 10th place but finished second in Belgium to climb up to second place in the championship. Vettel then retired at the Italian Grand Prix due to an alternator failure, which saw the gap to leader Alonso grow to 39 points with seven races remaining. He won next race in Singapore, as he kept the lead until the 2-hour race limit was reached. At the Japanese Grand Prix he took his second career grand slam and coupled with Alonso's retirement, he cut the gap down to just four points. After winning at the Korean Grand Prix, the Indian Grand Prix brought another victory, as Vettel topped all three practice sessions before taking pole position and leading every lap of the race to win.

During qualifying at the Abu Dhabi Grand Prix, Vettel was told to stop the car due to a fuel pump issue; he was forced to start from the pit lane. From last place, Vettel fought his way back to finish in third place. He started the last race in Brazil with a 13-point cushion against Alonso. On the opening lap, Vettel spun after an incident with Bruno Senna. Following changing weather conditions, Vettel climbed up to finish in sixth place to win the championship by three points and to become the youngest ever triple world champion. He also became the third driver to acquire three consecutive championships, after Juan Manuel Fangio and Schumacher.

==== 2013: Record-breaking season earns fourth world title ====
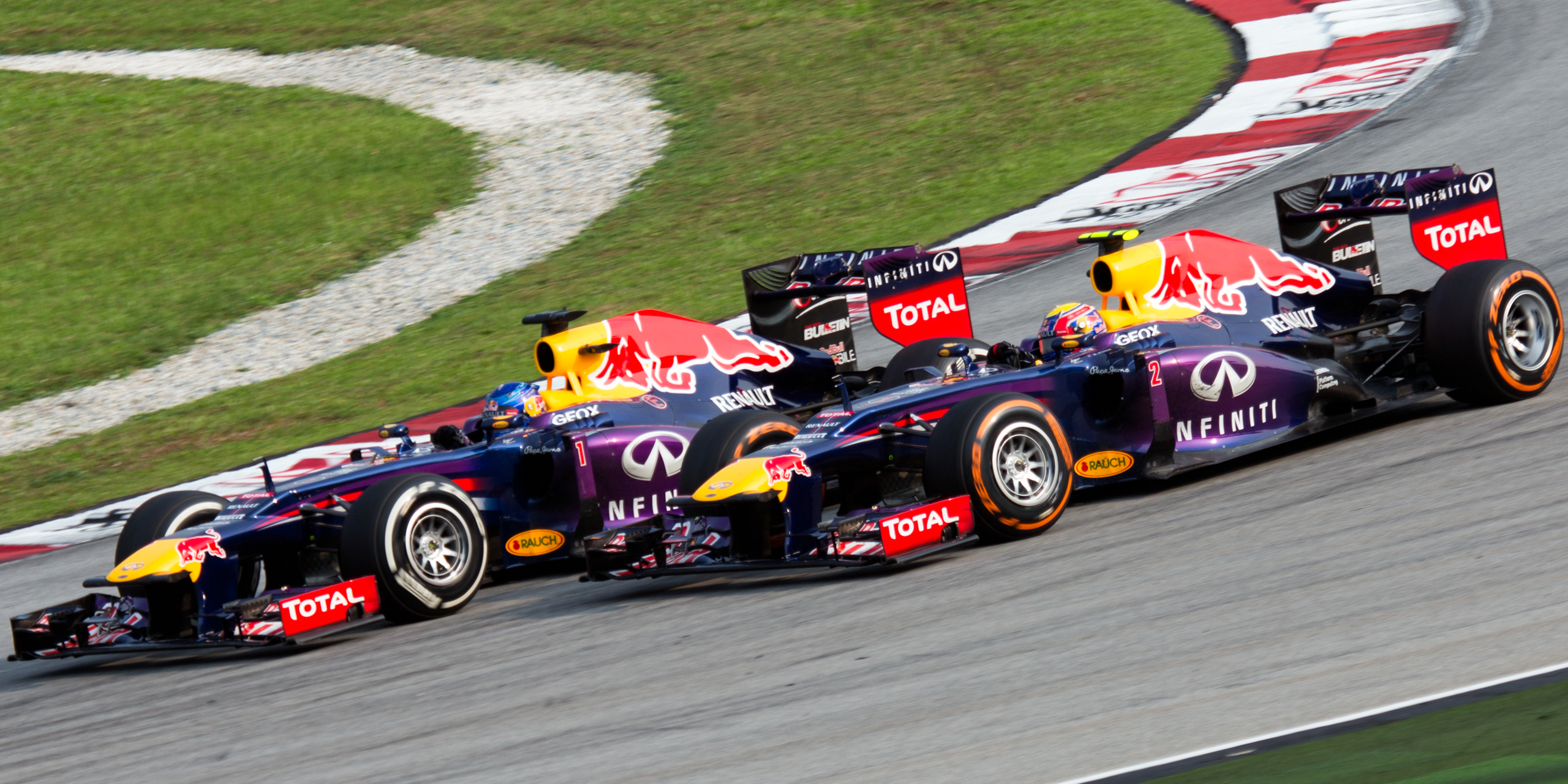
Vettel (left) controversially overtook teammate Mark Webber (right) for his first race win of the season at the 2013 Malaysian Grand Prix, despite being given team orders to maintain position.

Vettel started the first two races of the 2013 season on pole position, and at the Malaysian Grand Prix, he lapped over 2.5 seconds faster than teammate Webber in qualifying during a wet session. He won the race, though not without controversy. Vettel ignored the team orders and passed Webber for the lead. Webber was furious after the race and said that Vettel "will have protection as usual and that's the way it goes". Team principal Horner, although unhappy with Vettel's actions, pointed out that Webber had defied team orders on several previous occasions. He acknowledged that the already fragile relationship between the two drivers had further broken down as a result of the incident. Vettel claimed that he was not sorry for winning and that if the situation presented itself again, he would have passed Webber despite the order, adding that he felt Webber did not deserve to win the race.

Following wins in Bahrain and Canada, his championship lead was cut at the British Grand Prix as he was denied a likely win due to gearbox failure. Vettel bounced back to win his home race in Germany for the first time. After he finished third in Hungary, Vettel won the last nine races of the season, including grand slams in Singapore and Korea. Vettel set the then-record for most consecutive race wins with nine and he became only the third man after Alberto Ascari and Jim Clark to take consecutive grand slams. He sealed his fourth world title at the Indian Grand Prix; before the race weekend, Formula One CEO Bernie Ecclestone stated that Vettel was "probably the best [driver] we've ever had". Vettel totalled 13 wins by the end of the season and a then-record 155 points over runner-up Fernando Alonso.

On several occasions during the season, spectators booed Vettel. The booing was widely condemned by fellow drivers, the media and others in the paddock, and Vettel later revealed that it had a negative impact on him.

==== 2014: Winless year and departure from Red Bull ====
For the 2014 season and beyond, drivers picked a unique car number to use for the remainder of their Formula One career; Vettel chose the number five. However, as reigning World Drivers' Champion, he carried number one throughout the season. Webber left the sport and was replaced by Daniel Ricciardo, who was promoted from Toro Rosso.

Vettel struggled with reliability issues throughout winter testing, which forced him to retire at the opening Australian Grand Prix. Reliability problems also forced Vettel to retire at the Monaco and Austrian Grands Prix. Vettel qualified on the front-row for the races in Malaysia, Great Britain and Hungary, and finished on the podium in Malaysia, Canada, Singapore and Japan. After the Russian Grand Prix, he had been outqualified by a teammate over a season for the first time in his Formula One career. In addition to suffering reliability problems, throughout 2014 Vettel struggled to get to grips with the Red Bull RB10, and the Pirelli tyres. He signed off the year by becoming the first defending champion to fail to win a race during a season since Jacques Villeneuve in 1998.

In October, Red Bull had announced that Vettel would be leaving the team at the end of the season to join Scuderia Ferrari, one year before his contract was due to expire. Daniil Kvyat was later selected as his replacement. Vettel replaced Alonso and partnered his friend Kimi Räikkönen. Vettel mentioned he would like to drive for Ferrari at some point in his career and was already rumoured in 2012 to have a non-binding pre-contract, with options, to join them in 2014. He was denied an early release from his Red Bull contract to test the 2014 Ferrari car in Abu Dhabi. In spite of this, Vettel was present at the Ferrari test – although not driving the car – but Red Bull did not enforce any sanctions. Vettel instead made his first appearance in November, completing nearly 100 laps in the 2012 car around the test track of Fiorano.

=== Ferrari (2015–2020) ===
The next stage of my Formula 1 career will be spent with Scuderia Ferrari and for me that means the dream of a lifetime has come true... The Scuderia has a great tradition in this sport and I am extremely motivated to help the team get back to the top. I will put my heart and soul into making it happen.

— Sebastian Vettel, on his move to Ferrari

==== 2015: Returning to the top step ====
Vettel made his Ferrari debut by finishing third in the Australian Grand Prix. He followed that up with winning the Malaysian Grand Prix, his first race victory for over a year and the first win for Ferrari for almost two years. After the race, an emotional Vettel paid tribute to Schumacher, saying that his hero's achievements with Ferrari made the first win all the more special.

He won the Hungarian Grand Prix to remain a championship contender after he started from third on the grid. He dedicated his victory to the driver Jules Bianchi, who died the week prior from injuries sustained in 2014. At the halfway point of the season, Vettel was 42 points behind championship leader and Mercedes driver Hamilton. Vettel was in third place in Belgium when his right rear blew at high speed on the penultimate lap, likely ending any title chances given Hamilton's win. After the race, he ranted about the 'unacceptable' and 'unsafe' Pirelli tyres that could have caused him serious injury.

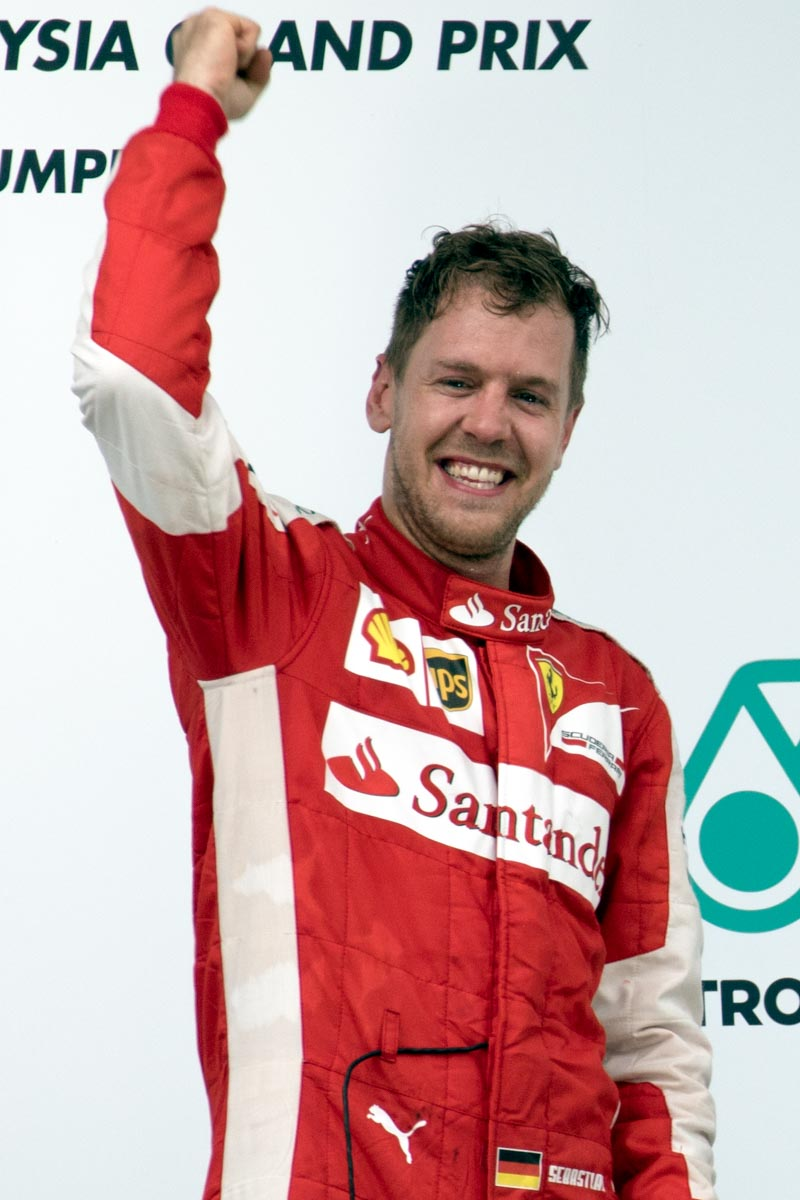
Vettel took his maiden win for Ferrari at the 2015 Malaysian Grand Prix.

Vettel came home second in the Italian Grand Prix, his first race with Ferrari at the team's home soil. He then took his first pole with the team at the Singapore Grand Prix, Ferrari's first pole for three years. Vettel went on to win the race, and with Hamilton retiring, he closed to within 49 points with seven races remaining. Vettel ended the season in third place, however, with three wins and 13 podiums; he declared the season as a 'miracle'.

==== 2016: Underwhelming season ====
After a third-place finish at the 2016 Australian Grand Prix, Vettel's participation in Bahrain ended without starting as his car broke down on the formation lap. At the Chinese Grand Prix, Vettel collided with teammate Räikkönen on the first lap, but both were able to continue. He blamed Red Bull driver Daniil Kvyat for the collision, labelling him a "madman" and described his overtaking manoeuvre as "suicidal". At the Russian Grand Prix, Vettel retired on the first lap after two consecutive collisions with Kvyat. At the Mexican Grand Prix, Vettel attempted to overtake Red Bull driver Max Verstappen, but after Verstappen ran off the track and rejoined ahead of him, Vettel verbally attacked him and race director Charlie Whiting, for which he later apologised. Vettel then blocked Red Bull's Ricciardo by moving in the braking zone, and was given a ten-second penalty and two points on his licence. Although he achieved seven podium finishes during the season, Vettel did not win any races in 2016.

==== 2017–2018: Title battles versus Hamilton ====
His third season at Ferrari started with victory in Australia, his first in 18 months. The early form continued the following races, winning in Bahrain and Monaco, and finishing second in China, Russia and Spain. In Russia, Vettel took his first pole position in 18 months and with Räikkönen alongside him, Ferrari had their first front row lock out since the 2008 French Grand Prix. Vettel's lead at the top of the standings increased to 25 points after the Monaco Grand Prix, Ferrari's first victory at the circuit since Schumacher won there in 2001.

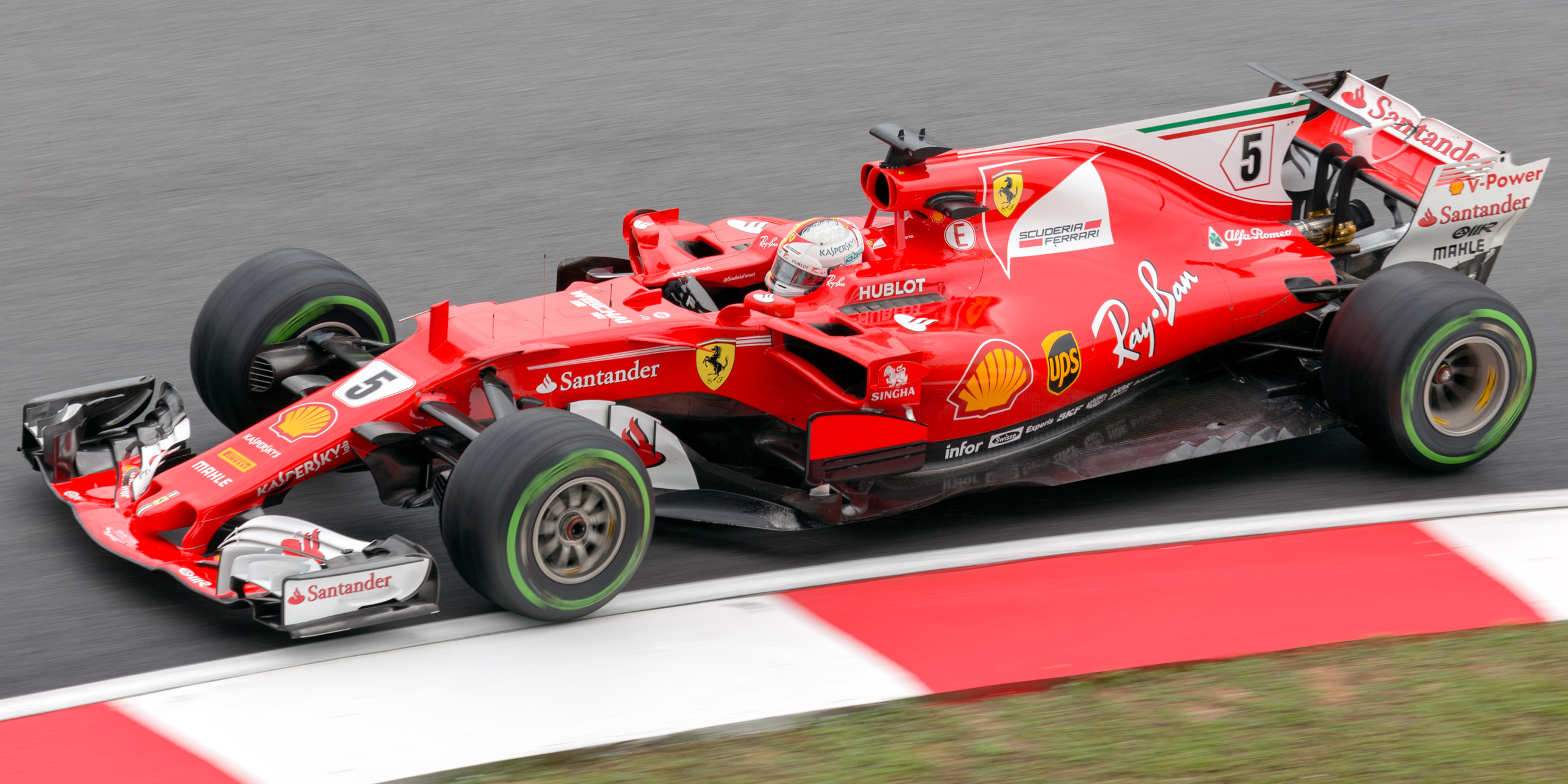
Vettel began competing for titles once again during the 2017 and 2018 seasons, rivalling Lewis Hamilton, though ultimately never claiming the championship.

In Azerbaijan, Vettel collided into the rear of race leader Hamilton under the safety car, accusing Hamilton of brake testing him. Moments later, Vettel pulled alongside and hit his Mercedes as they prepared for a restart, for which he received a ten-second stop-go penalty. The FIA investigated the Vettel-Hamilton incident further, but Vettel received no punishment. Vettel took full responsibility, issuing a public apology and committing to devote personal time over the next 12 months to educational activities across a variety of FIA championships and events.

Vettel's championship lead was cut to only a single point in Great Britain, as he suffered a puncture on the penultimate lap and dropped to seventh place. Vettel started from pole in Hungary and maintained the lead. He overcame steering issues and held on for victory, which gave him a 14-point lead over Hamilton. Mercedes dominated after the summer break and Vettel lost the championship lead at the Italian Grand Prix, which was followed by a first-lap retirement in Singapore after collision with Räikkönen and Verstappen. It was the first time in Formula One history that both Ferraris retired from the first lap of a Grand Prix. His title hopes were dealt another blow in Malaysia, as he started last following a turbo problem in qualifying. He finished in fourth place, but crashed with Williams' Lance Stroll on the cool-down lap; neither would be penalised. More reliability issues befell Ferrari in Japan as Vettel retired due to a spark plug failure. In Mexico, Vettel became the fourth driver in Formula One history to claim 50 pole positions. Verstappen took the lead from Vettel at the start, before Vettel collided with Hamilton, after which Hamilton won his fourth title. For the first time in his career, Vettel failed to win the World Drivers' Championship having led it at some stage during a season.

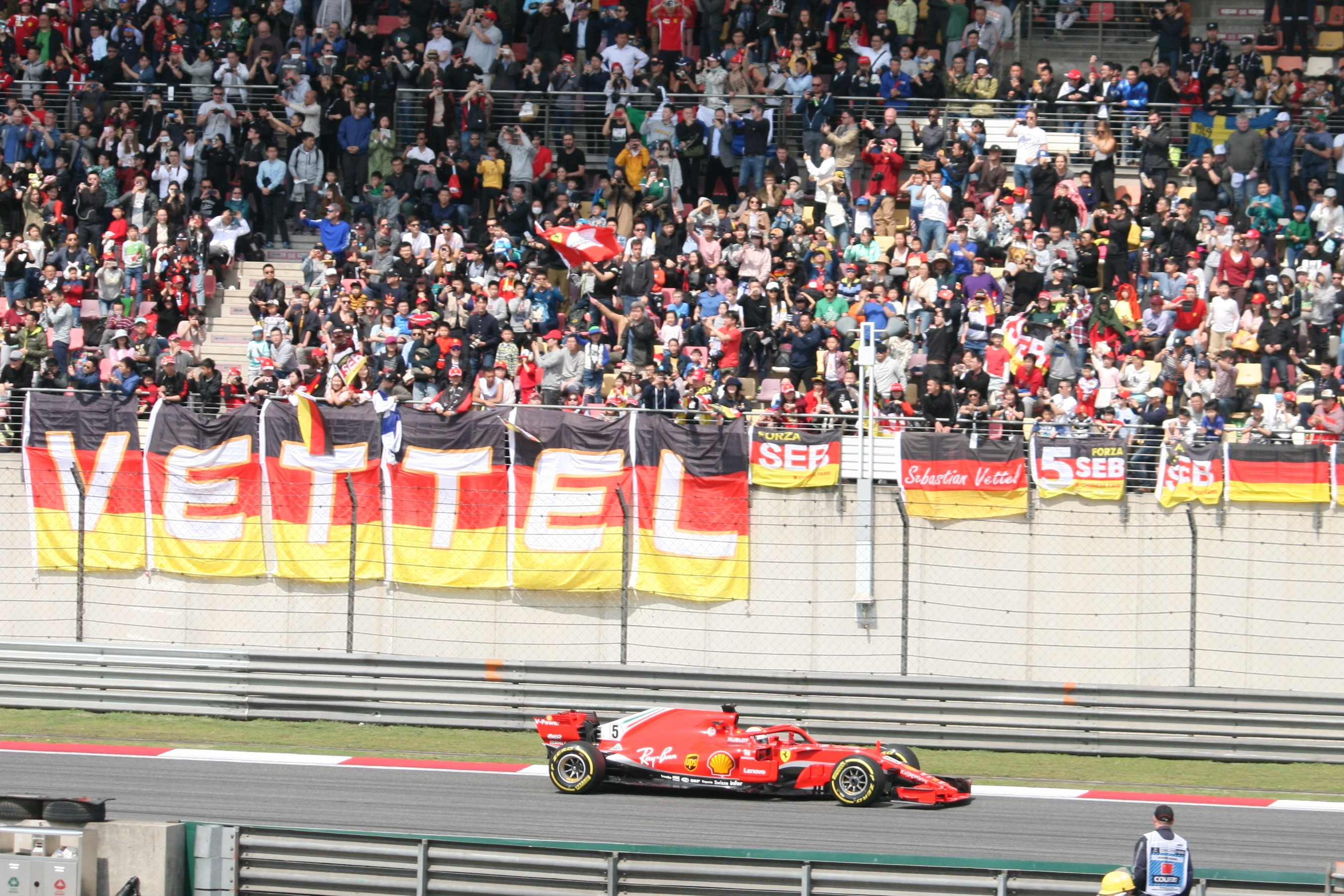
Vettel driving past his fans at the 2018 Chinese Grand Prix

The 2018 season was dubbed the "Fight For Five" by the media, as for the first time in Formula One history, two quadruple world champions lined up at the start of a season. For the second consecutive year, Vettel began the season with victory in Australia, after he took the lead while pitting under the virtual safety car. It was his 100th podium, while he also became only the third man in Formula One history to have led 3,000 laps. In Bahrain, Vettel maintained the lead from pole through the first round of pit stops and held off Mercedes' Valtteri Bottas despite being on old soft tyres to take a fourth victory at the circuit. At the Chinese Grand Prix, he was hit by Verstappen in the latter stages of the race, which caused both to spin. Vettel limped home in eighth place, with his championship lead reduced to nine points. For the first time since 2013, Vettel took three consecutive pole positions as he qualified in first place in Azerbaijan. It was the 23rd different Grand Prix at which he had taken pole position, equalling Hamilton's then-record.

At the Canadian Grand Prix, Vettel won for the third time in 2018 and for the 50th time in his career, becoming only the fourth man to reach a half-century of wins. The following race in France, Vettel lost the championship lead following a collision with Bottas. He bounced back in Great Britain, after he passed Bottas in the last laps to take victory. Vettel led his home race until he slid off the track and hit the wall in the latter stages as rain started to fall, as he had clipped the sausage curb a few laps before, breaking a part of his front wing, causing understeer and loss of downforce; he won in Belgium, however, in which he passed Hamilton for the race victory. Contact on the opening lap with Hamilton in Italy saw Vettel damage his front wing and drop to the back of the field, but he recovered to cross the finishing line in fourth place. It left Vettel 30 points behind the Mercedes driver with seven races left. His championship hopes were dealt a further blow as Ferrari's upgrades introduced at the Singapore Grand Prix proved to be unsuccessful, making a step backwards on car development; Ferrari suffered a dip of form until the United States Grand Prix, where they reverted to their old package and successfully rediscovered their form. Vettel claimed his first ever podium in Mexico but the World Drivers' Championship went to Hamilton for a second consecutive year. Although Mercedes had been the more consistent and better team, fans and pundits criticised Vettel for making too many mistakes during the season.

==== 2019–2020: Decline and departure from Ferrari ====
After showing impressive pace throughout pre-season testing in Barcelona, Vettel and his new teammate Charles Leclerc headed to Australia with many pundits believing they had the car to beat for the 2019 season. The opening weekend proved to be difficult, however, as Vettel qualified some seven tenths off pole position in third and finished the race in fourth place. Third-place finishes in China and Azerbaijan followed, as Mercedes continued to dominate. Vettel took pole position in Canada; his first pole in 17 races. Midway through the race, a snap of oversteer caused him to run wide onto the grass. Vettel received a five-second time penalty from the stewards, who believed he had returned to the track "in an unsafe manner and forced [Hamilton] off track". Vettel crossed the line in first place but lost his victory as a result of the penalty. After the race, he swapped the number one and two signs in front of Hamilton's Mercedes and the empty spot that was supposed for his own car, as Vettel parked his car at the start of the pit entry. At the German Grand Prix, Vettel was unable to qualify after a turbo issue, which meant he would start in last place. During a race with mixed weather conditions, Vettel climbed up to second place.

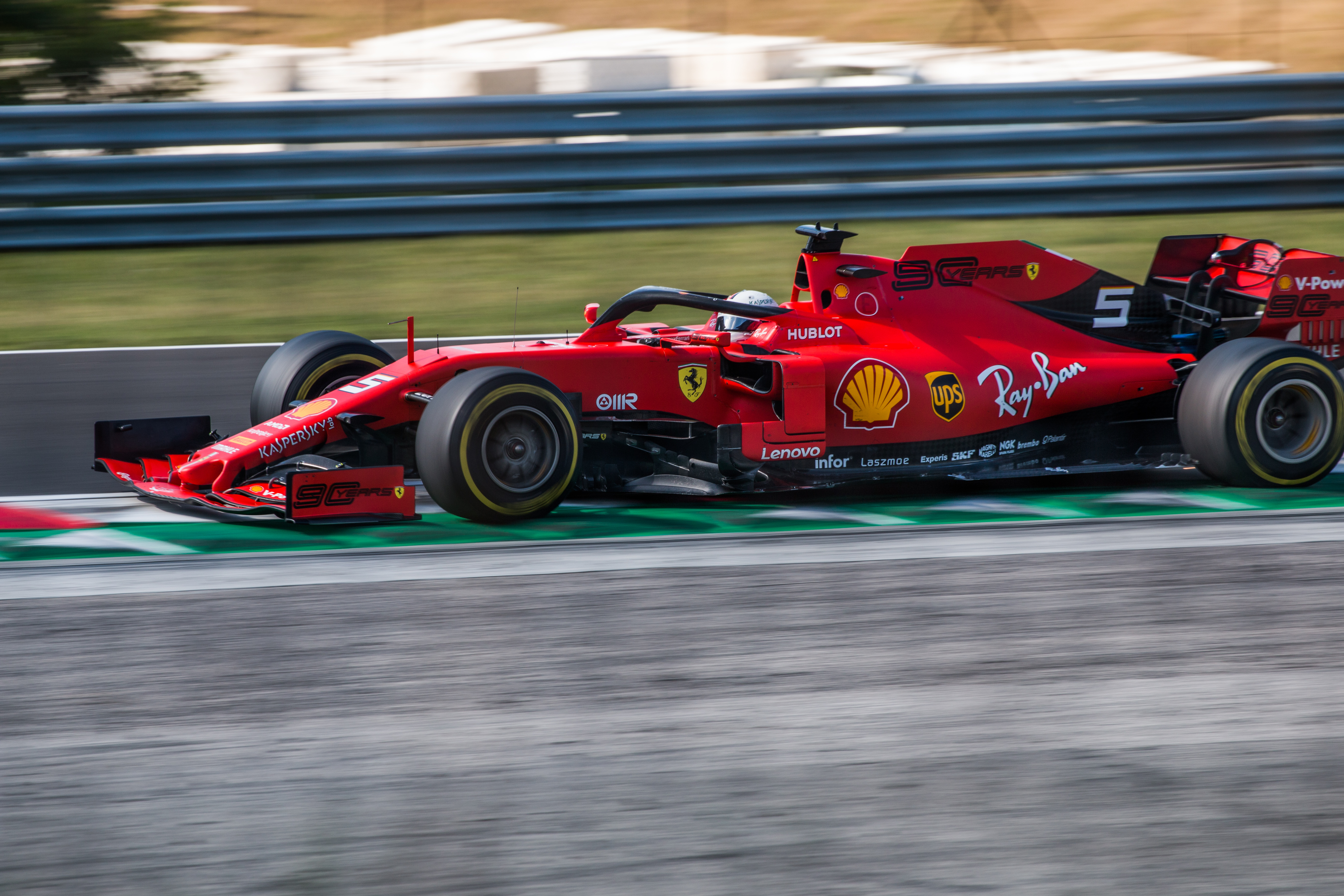
Vettel claimed his last race win at the 2019 Singapore Grand Prix.

In Italy, Vettel spun at the Ascari chicane and when he re-entered the track, he made contact with Racing Point's Stroll. Vettel received a 10-second stop-go penalty and finished in 13th place. At the Singapore Grand Prix, Vettel won on a circuit Ferrari were expected to struggle at. For the first time, Vettel had won five times at the same track. The following race, in Russia, Vettel went from third place on the grid to first place in the first corner. However, radio transmissions suggested that the team wanted to swap their drivers, but with Vettel the quicker driver, he remained in front. Vettel retired soon after with a MGU-K problem.

Vettel took pole position in Japan, but an abrupt start off the line caused him to momentarily stop before getting away, which allowed Bottas to take the lead; Vettel was not penalized for his jump start. After running in third at the Brazilian Grand Prix for the majority of the race, a safety car allowed Red Bull's Alexander Albon and an aggressive Leclerc to overtake him. He tried to pass his teammate immediately but the two Ferraris collided, resulting in another retirement for Vettel. He finished fifth in the World Drivers' Championship, and was outscored by a teammate for only the second time across a season.

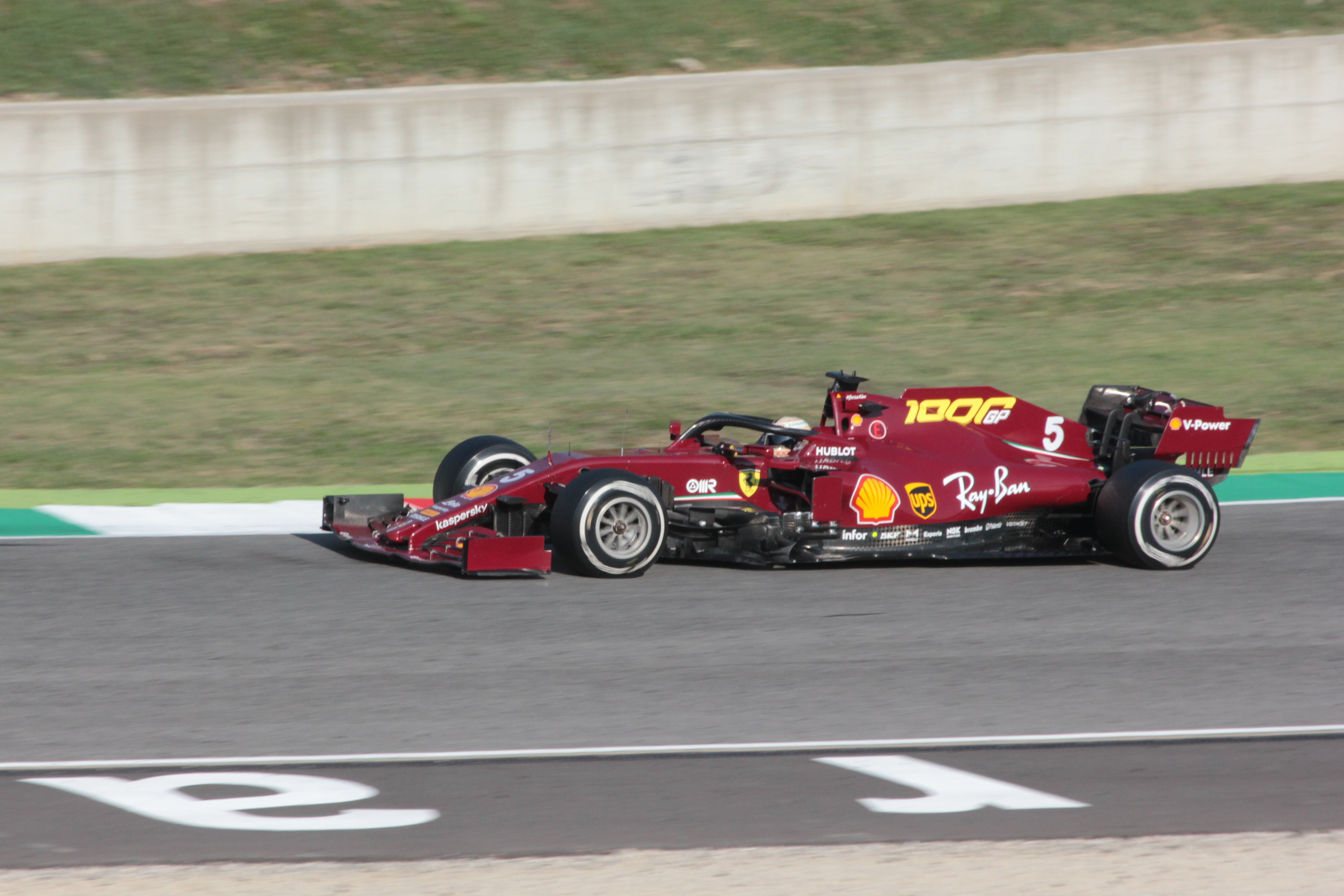
Sebastian Vettel competing for Ferrari on their 1000th Grand Prix

Ferrari later announced they would not extend Vettel's contract beyond the 2020 season. Team principal Mattia Binotto explained there was "no specific reason" for the decision, though both parties noted it was an amicable agreement. The team would sign Carlos Sainz Jr. as Vettel's replacement. The season was disrupted by the COVID-19 pandemic as the first ten races of the original calendar were either rescheduled, postponed or cancelled altogether. Ferrari discovered problems on their car following pre-season testing, forcing them to make a major redesign.

The SF1000 lacked pace as Vettel finished the season's opening race in Austria in 10th place. During the weekend, he was also given a warning for breaching the FIA's COVID-19 protocols after he was seen mixing with members of his former team Red Bull. The following race, at the Styrian Grand Prix, Vettel retired on the opening lap with rear wing damage following a collision with Leclerc. He ended the season in a disappointing 13th place in the Drivers' standings, with a third place in Turkey as his best result. Ferrari only finished sixth in the Constructors' standings, their worst result since 1980, while Vettel's total of 33 points was the lowest in a full campaign in his Formula One career.

=== Aston Martin (2021–2022) ===
==== 2021: Final podium ====
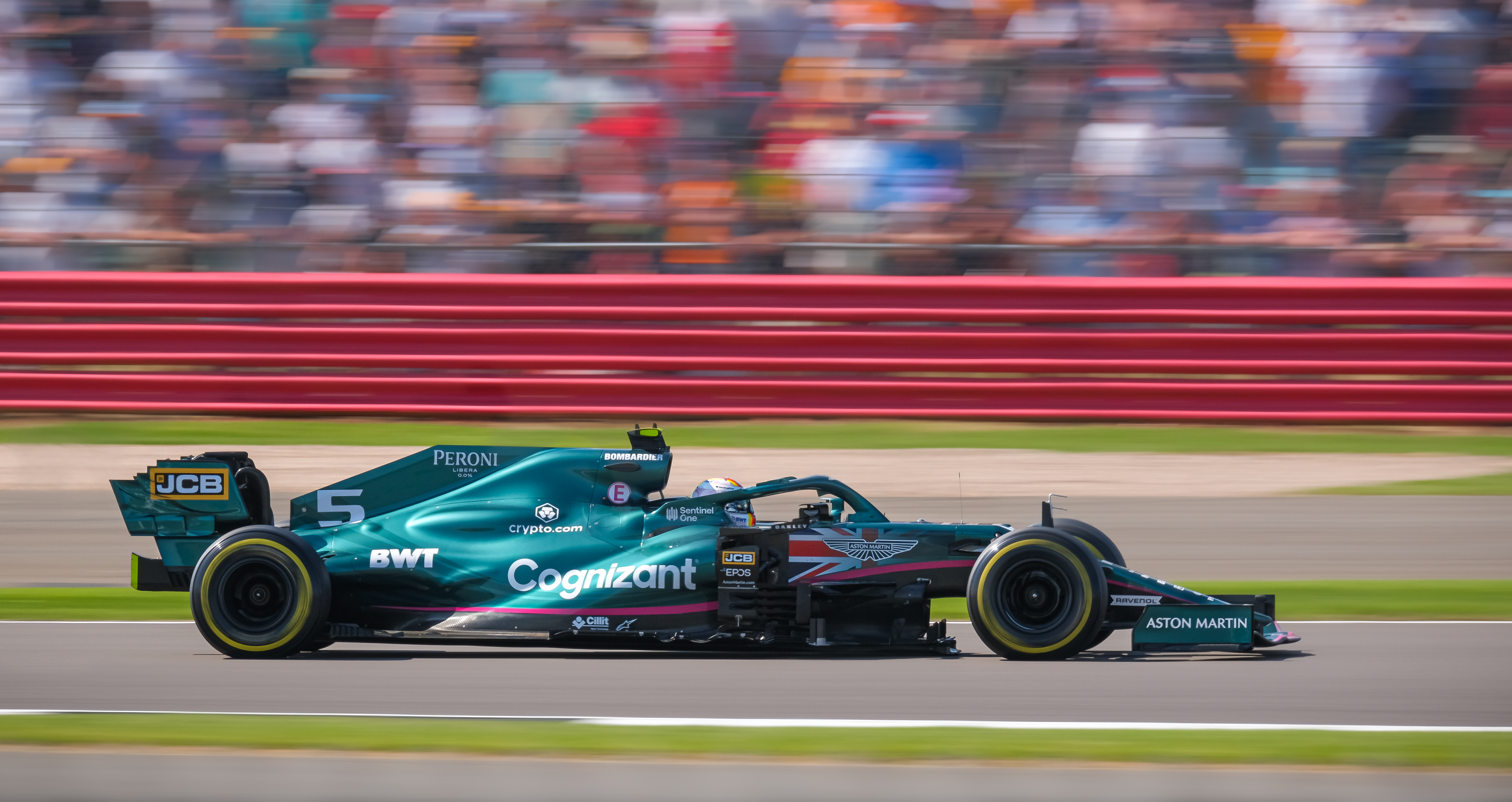
Vettel claimed his final podium at the 2021 Azerbaijan Grand Prix.

Vettel joined Aston Martin for the 2021 season, replacing Sergio Pérez. In his debut race weekend in Bahrain, he received a grid penalty in qualifying, forcing him to start last. While Vettel started well, he had a collision with Esteban Ocon, giving him a time penalty and ended up finishing in 15th place. He received five penalty points on his superlicence. Aston Martin team principal Otmar Szafnauer reported no concerns, owing to this being a very different car from the Ferrari, lack of laps in pre-season testing and a very impressive race start. In the fifth race of the season, Vettel scored his first points for the team with a fifth-place finish in Monaco. At the following race, the Azerbaijan Grand Prix, he claimed Aston Martin's first, and his final, podium with a second-place finish. Vettel also finished second in Hungary, but was later disqualified, after his car failed to provide the one litre sample of fuel required. He ended the season in 12th place in the Drivers' standings, ahead of teammate Stroll. During the season, Vettel made 132 overtakes—the most of any driver—and won the inaugural Overtake Award.

==== 2022: Retirement ====
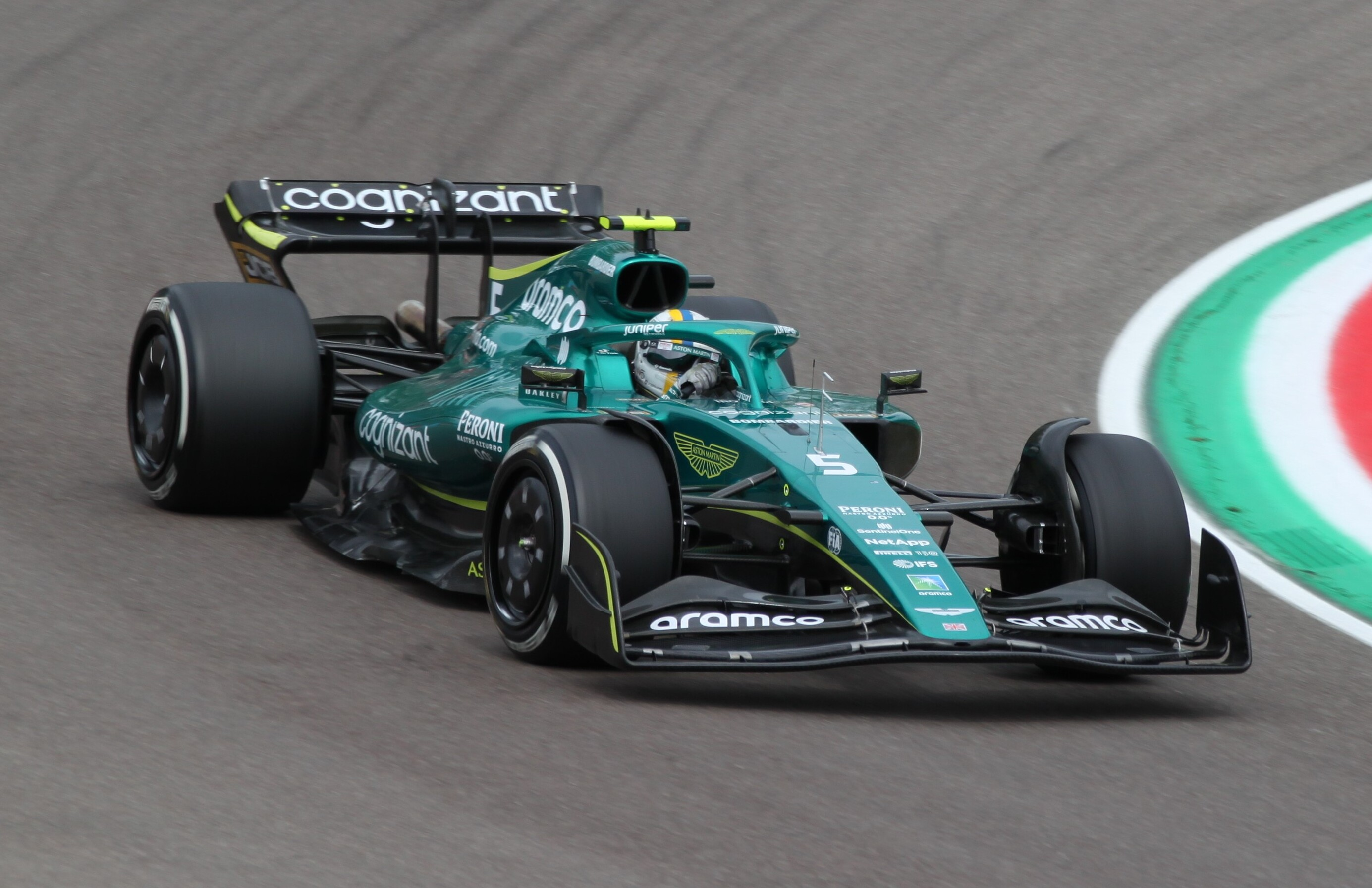
Vettel (pictured at the Emilia Romagna Grand Prix) competing in his final F1 season in 2022.

Vettel missed the first two races of the 2022 season in Bahrain and Saudi Arabia after testing positive for COVID-19; he was substituted by Aston Martin's reserve driver Nico Hülkenberg. In July 2022, Vettel announced his retirement from Formula One at the end of the 2022 season. Vettel would score his last F1 career point at his 300th and final race at Abu Dhabi to end his final F1 season in 12th place in the standings. 2022 was also the first time that Vettel failed to achieve a podium finish since 2007.

== Driver profile ==
=== Comparison to Michael Schumacher ===
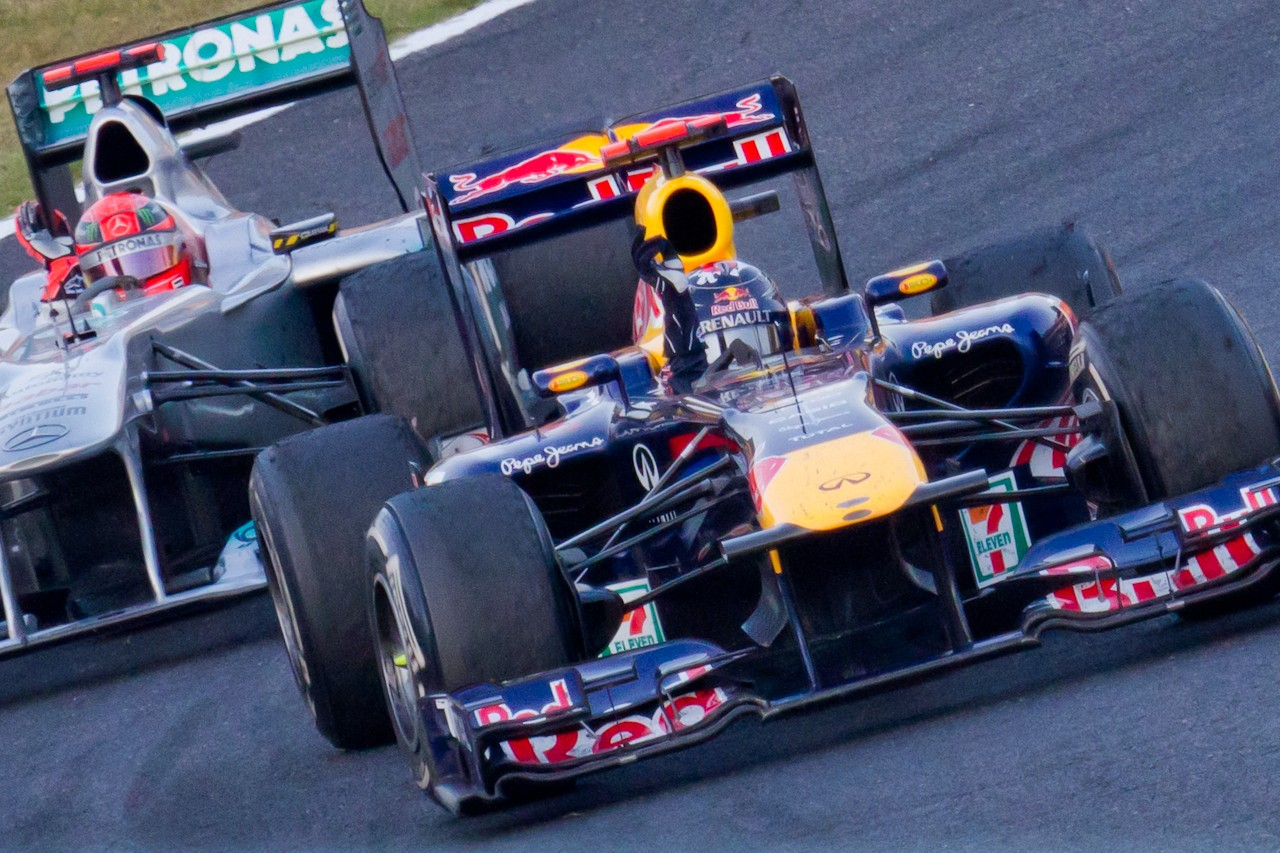
Vettel and Michael Schumacher after the 2011 Japanese Grand Prix, where Vettel won his second World Championship title

Vettel's unexpected win at the 2008 Italian Grand Prix led the media to dub him the "Baby Schumi". He was not just dubbed this for his nationality but also because of his driving style, his concentration and the hands-on role he plays behind the scenes with his team of engineers. Vettel played down the comparison stating he wanted to be the "New Vettel".

Nevertheless, the similarities were marked. Like Schumacher, Vettel grew up in a small town with an everyday background—Schumacher's father is a bricklayer and Vettel's is a carpenter. Both had their first taste of racing at the Kerpen karting track near Cologne, not far from the Nürburgring. Vettel began driving in his garden lapping the garden many times before he could legally take to the roads, and said his passion for cars was nurtured by watching Schumacher compete.

After winning his first championship in 2010, and being hailed as the "Next Schumacher", Vettel stated he did not want to aim for Schumacher's record after learning how hard it was to get one championship under his belt, though he would like to win more. In 2011, Pirelli director Paul Hembery was impressed when Vettel was the only driver to take the time to visit the factory and talk to the tyre manufacturer to gain a better insight. "The only other driver that asks us a lot of questions is Michael Schumacher. It is like seeing the master and the protégé at work."

After Schumacher was severely injured in a skiing accident in late 2013, Vettel was on hand to collect the Millennium-Bambi Award for Schumacher's life achievements on his behalf in 2014. In 2014, Vettel cited Schumacher as one of his inspirations in becoming a Scuderia Ferrari driver: "When I was a kid, Michael Schumacher in the red car was my greatest idol and now it's an incredible honour to finally get the chance to drive a Ferrari."

=== Helmet ===
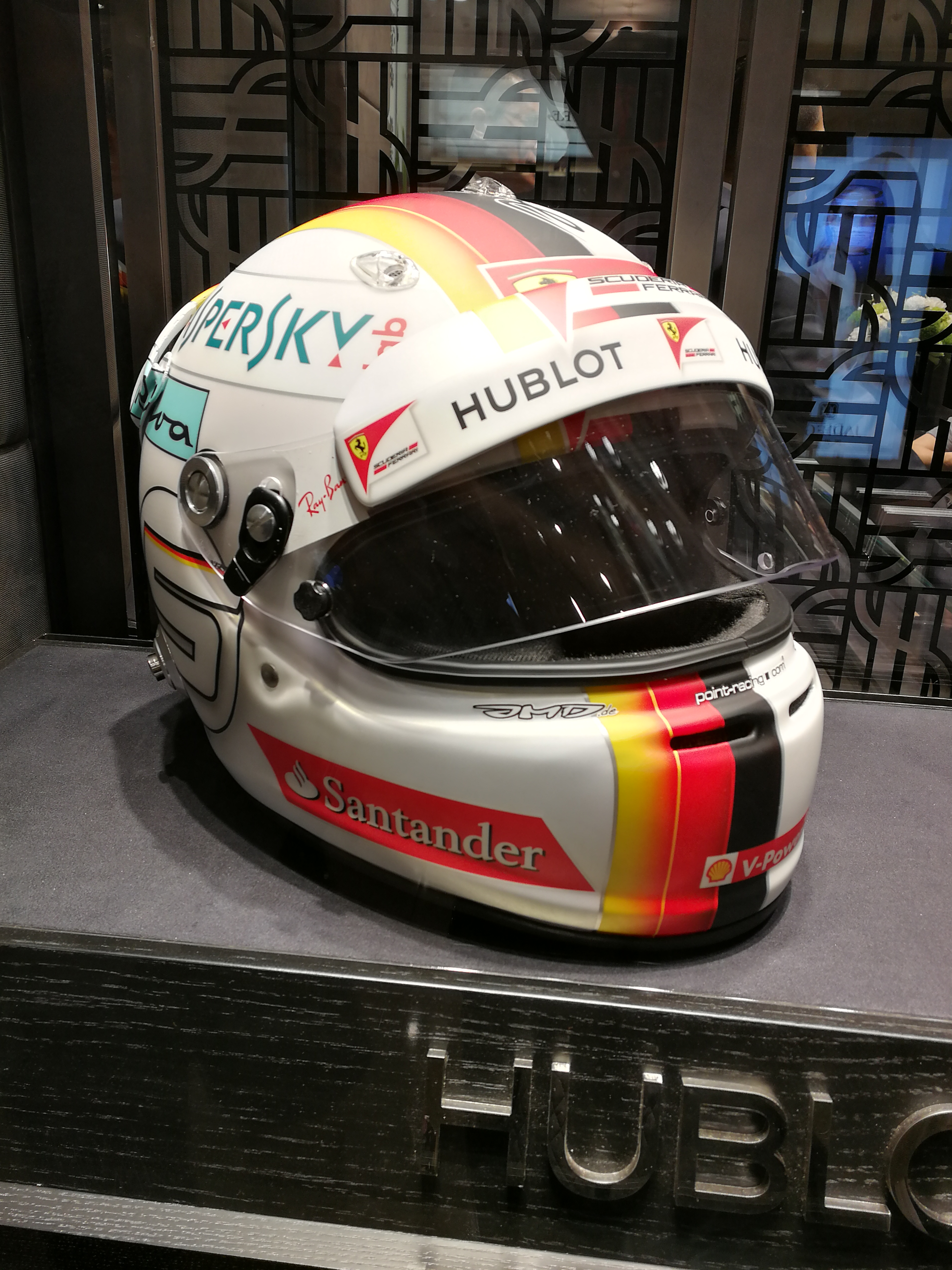
Vettel's 2017 helmet design

From his karting days, Vettel worked with helmet designer Jens Munser. At the age of eight, Vettel wanted Sebastian the crab from The Little Mermaid on his helmet. Vettel's original helmet in Formula One, like most Red Bull-backed drivers, was heavily influenced by the energy drink company logo. New to Vettel's helmet at the start of 2008 was the incorporation of the red cross shape of the Kreis Bergstraße coat of arms on the front, just underneath the visor, in honour of the region of his birthplace, Heppenheim.

After switching to Red Bull in 2009, Vettel regularly used a variety of new helmet designs. Some designs were small changes to his original Red Bull design, while others were completely new designs, such as the one he used at the 2010 Japanese Grand Prix: Vettel had a special white-red helmet design, with black kanji and hiragana for "gives you wings". Several of his helmet designs also featured his team members. At the 2012 Italian Grand Prix, Vettel celebrated his 50th helmet design with a 'rusty' matte look and 50 tallies, indicating his 50 helmet designs in Formula One. Vettel started his 2013 campaign with a design in honour of Felix Baumgartner, for his world record Red Bull Stratos space jump in October 2012. By the end of the 2013 season, he had used 76 different helmet designs throughout his career.

For the 2017 Italian Grand Prix he changed the German flag stripe on his helmet to an Italian flag stripe in celebration of Ferrari's home race. Following the death of Niki Lauda, Vettel wore a special helmet based on Lauda's final Ferrari helmet at the 2019 Monaco Grand Prix. Vettel carried the German flag stripe design over to his helmet designs during his time at Aston Martin, with his final design for the 2022 Abu Dhabi Grand Prix nicknamed "The Final Lap".

=== Car names ===
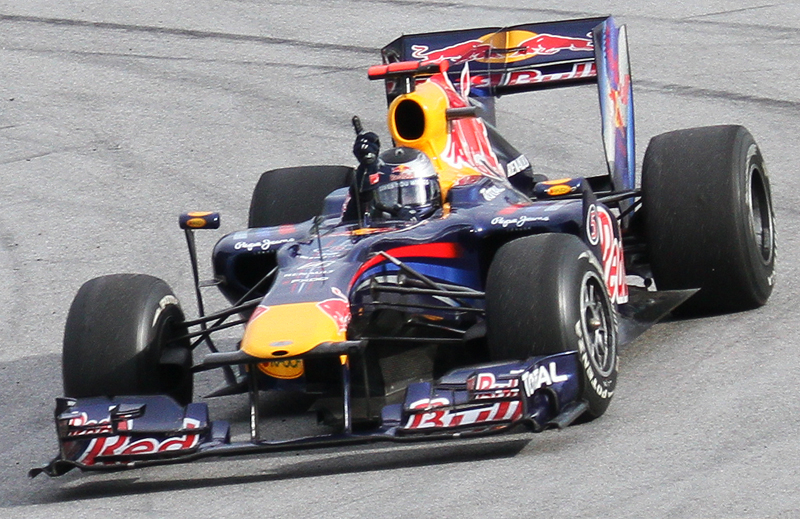
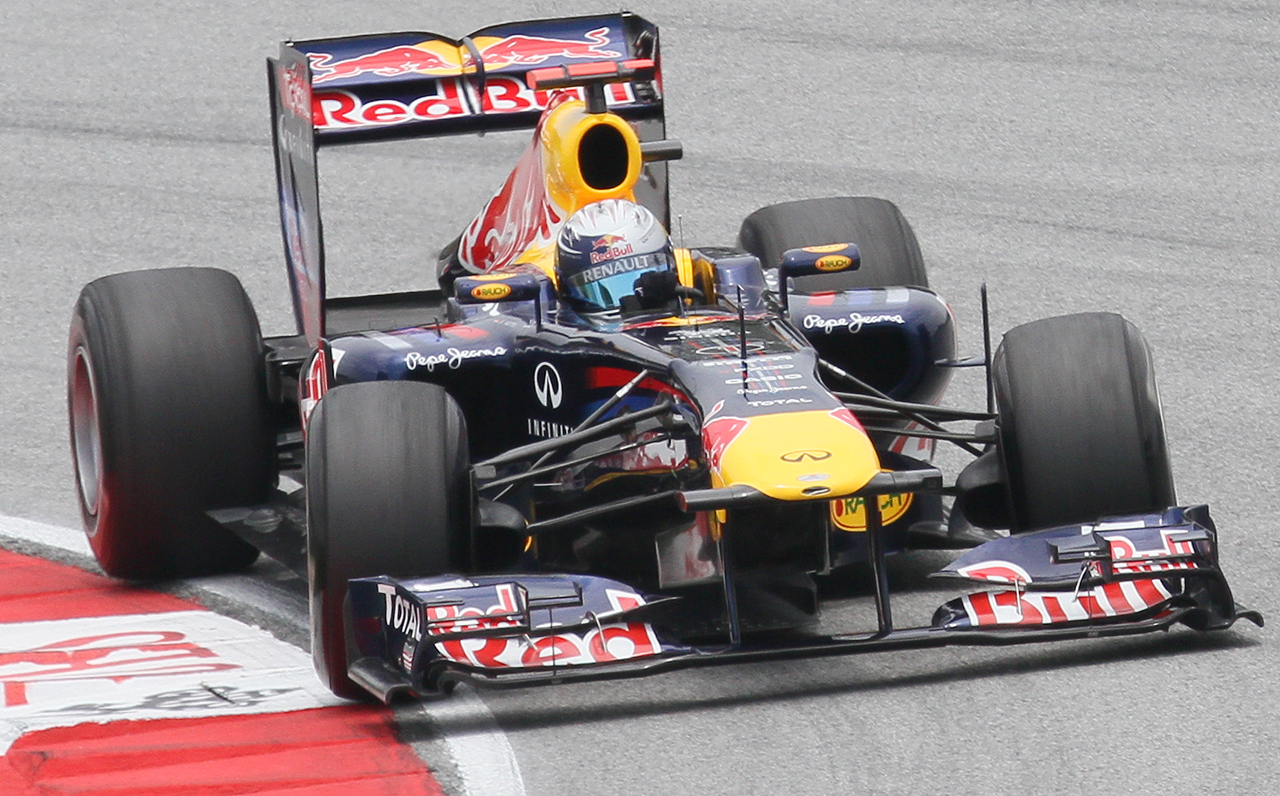
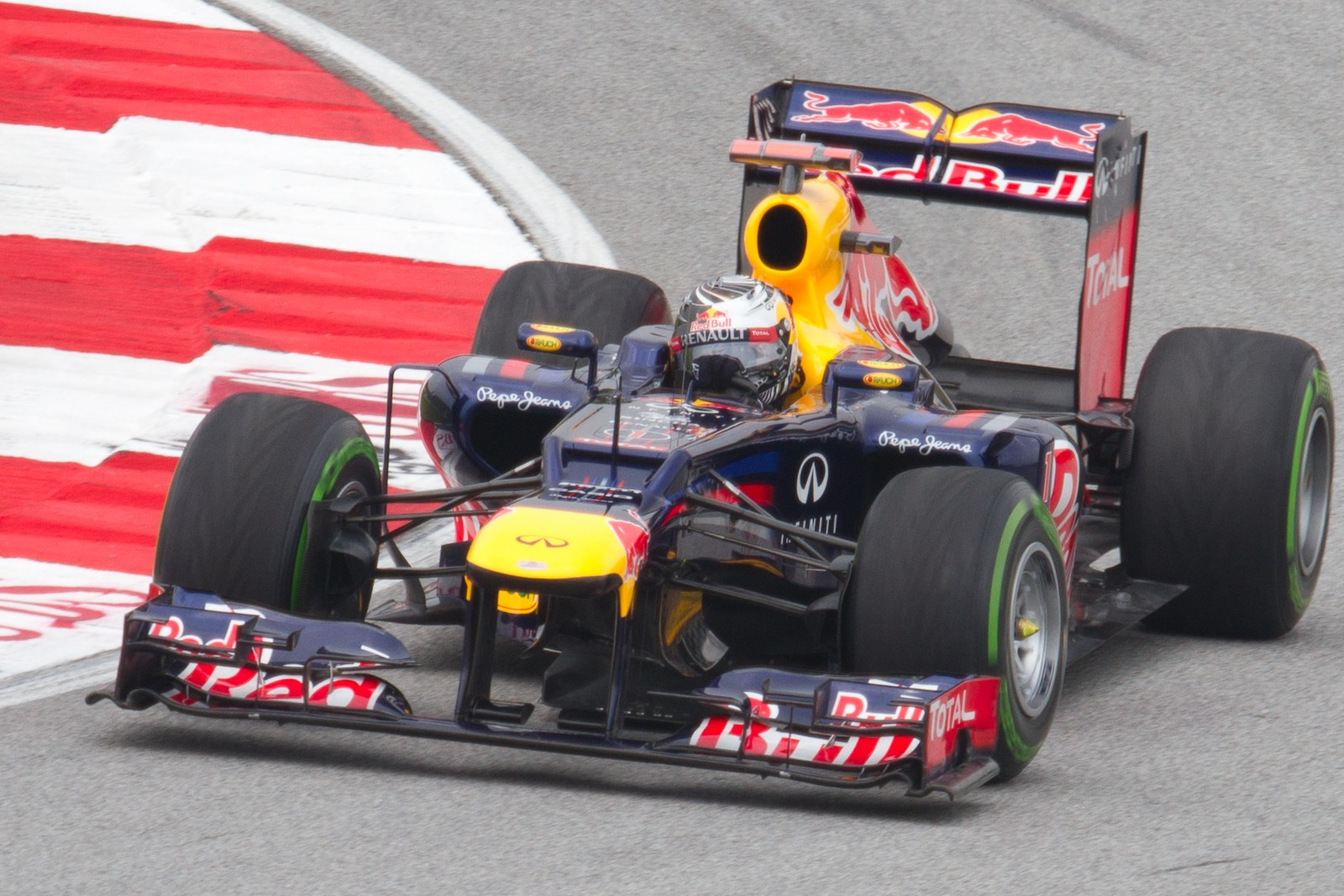
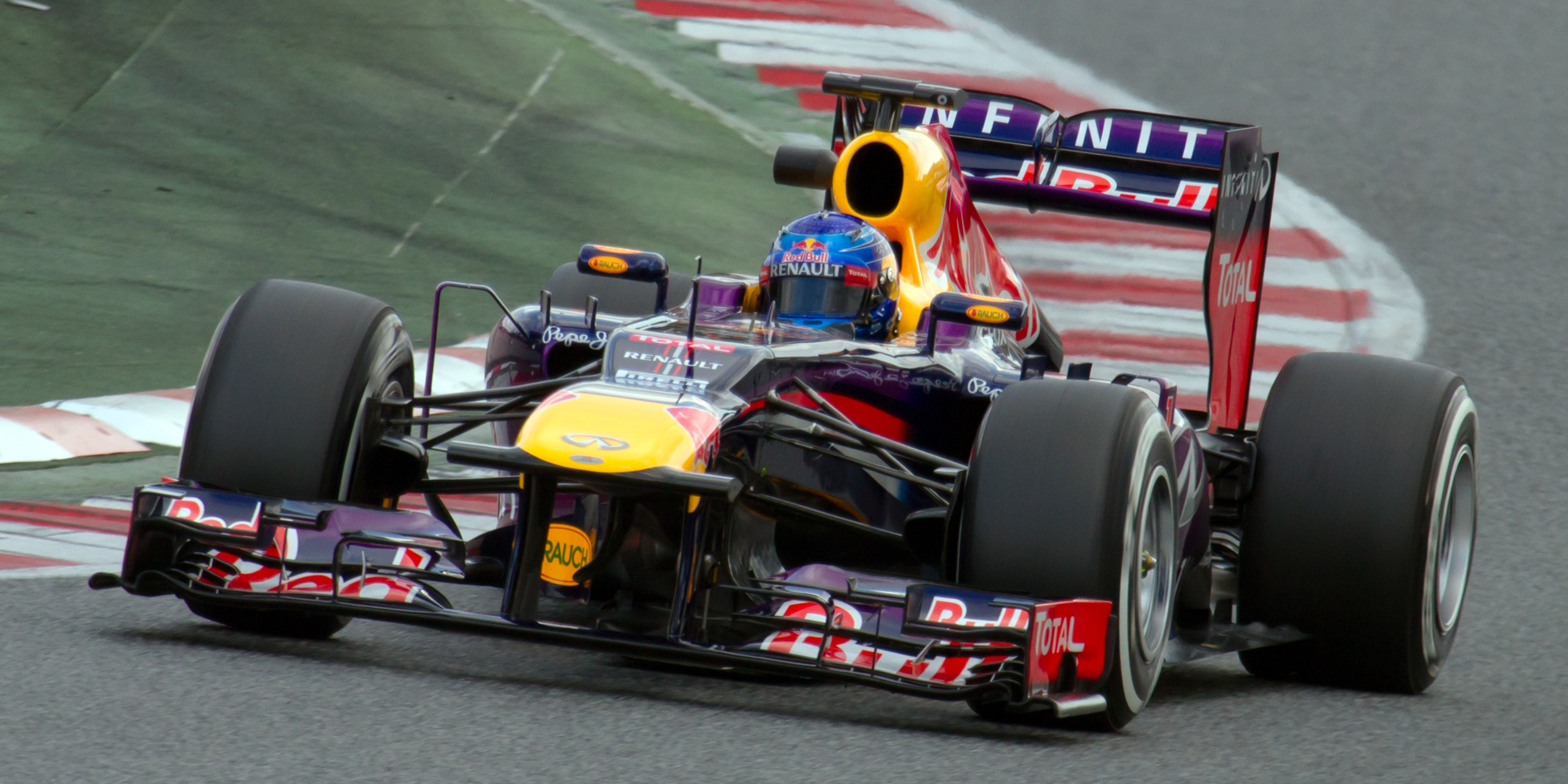
Vettel's four championship-winning cars from top-to-bottom: Luscious Liz and Randy Mandy (2010), Kinky Kylie (2011), Abbey (2012) and Hungry Heidi (2013)

Inspired by American bomber pilots during World War II, Vettel made it a tradition to name each of his cars in Formula One from 2008 to 2021, stating "it's important to have a close relationship with a car. Like a ship, a car should be named after a girl as it's sexy".

The car Vettel drove during his first full season in 2008—the Toro Rosso STR3—was named Julie, with which he took his maiden victory at the Italian Grand Prix. Upon moving to Red Bull in 2009, he initially named the RB5 Kate, but renamed it to Kate's Dirty Sister following his collision with Robert Kubica at the season-opening Australian Grand Prix. The RB6 in 2010 was Vettel's first championship-winning car, at first called Luscious Liz before a chassis change saw its renaming to Randy Mandy from the Turkish Grand Prix onwards. Vettel's further three consecutive championship-winning machines were named Kinky Kylie (2011), Abbey (2012) and Hungry Heidi (2013), the latter of which saw Vettel equal Michael Schumacher's single-season win record from 2004, and win a then-record nine consecutive races. 2014's RB10 was named Suzie, the only car he did not win with at Red Bull.

Vettel continued this tradition with Ferrari, naming the SF15-T Eva in 2015. His subsequent Ferrari challengers were named Margherita (2016), Gina (2017), Loria (2018), Lina (2019) and Lucilla (2020). In 2021, Vettel named his Aston Martin AMR21 after Honey Ryder, the love interest from the James Bond film Dr. No (1962), in a nod to Aston Martin's longstanding relationship with the franchise. Amidst struggles with car performance in 2022, Vettel said he would wait for upgrades to the AMR22 before naming it; no name for the AMR22 was ever publicised, ending Vettel's 14-year tradition.

Season	Constructor	Chassis	Name(s)	Wins
2008	Toro Rosso	STR3	Julie	1
2009	Red Bull	RB5	Kate; Kate's Dirty Sister (Note: Vettel renamed the Red Bull RB5 from Kate to Kate's Dirty Sister after his collision with Robert Kubica at the 2009 Australian Grand Prix.)	4
2010	Red Bull	RB6	Luscious Liz; Randy Mandy (Note: Vettel renamed the Red Bull RB6 from Luscious Liz to Randy Mandy following a chassis change after the 2010 Monaco Grand Prix.)	5
2011	Red Bull	RB7	Kinky Kylie	11
2012	Red Bull	RB8	Abbey	5
2013	Red Bull	RB9	Hungry Heidi	13
2014	Red Bull	RB10	Suzie	0
2015	Ferrari	SF15-T	Eva	3
2016	Ferrari	SF16-H	Margherita	0
2017	Ferrari	SF70H	Gina	5
2018	Ferrari	SF71H	Loria	5
2019	Ferrari	SF90	Lina	1
2020	Ferrari	SF1000	Lucilla	0
2021	Aston Martin	AMR21	Honey Ryder	0

=== Awards and honours ===
Vettel was named Rookie of the Year at the 2008 Autosport Awards. In 2009, Vettel was awarded the Lorenzo Bandini Trophy, for his achievements in the 2008 season. He was also awarded the 2009 British Racing Drivers' Club Johnny Wakefield Trophy for "setting the fastest race lap of the season on the Silverstone Grand Prix Circuit". In 2010, Vettel was voted German Sportspersonality of the Year and won the Autosport International Racing Driver Award, which he also won in the following three years. In January 2012, Vettel was honoured with the Grands Prix de l'Academie des Sports, and in February, he was further honoured with the Silbernes Lorbeerblatt, in recognition of his world titles and his "exemplary character". Vettel was voted Formula One driver of the year in 2009, 2011 and 2013 by the team principals, initiated by the Autosport magazine. He additionally won the DHL Fastest Lap Award in 2009, 2012 and 2013. He was named European Sportsperson of the Year by the International Sports Press Association in 2010, and by the Polish Press Agency in 2012 and 2013. Furthermore, Vettel was named the BBC Overseas Sports Personality of the Year in 2013. He was named Sportsman of the Year at the 2014 Laureus World Sports Awards. In 2015, he received the Confartigianato Motori Award for Driver of the Year. After retiring from Formula One in 2022, Vettel received the Autosport Gregor Grant Award for his "achievement in motorsport".

In 2026, he received The Perfect World Foundation Award in Sweden, recognising his efforts to raise global awareness of environmental and biodiversity challenges.

Red Bull Racing sponsor Infiniti released a Sebastian Vettel edition of the Infiniti FX SUV for 2012. It featured increased engine power, revised bodywork and lower suspension than the standard model.

== Race of Champions ==
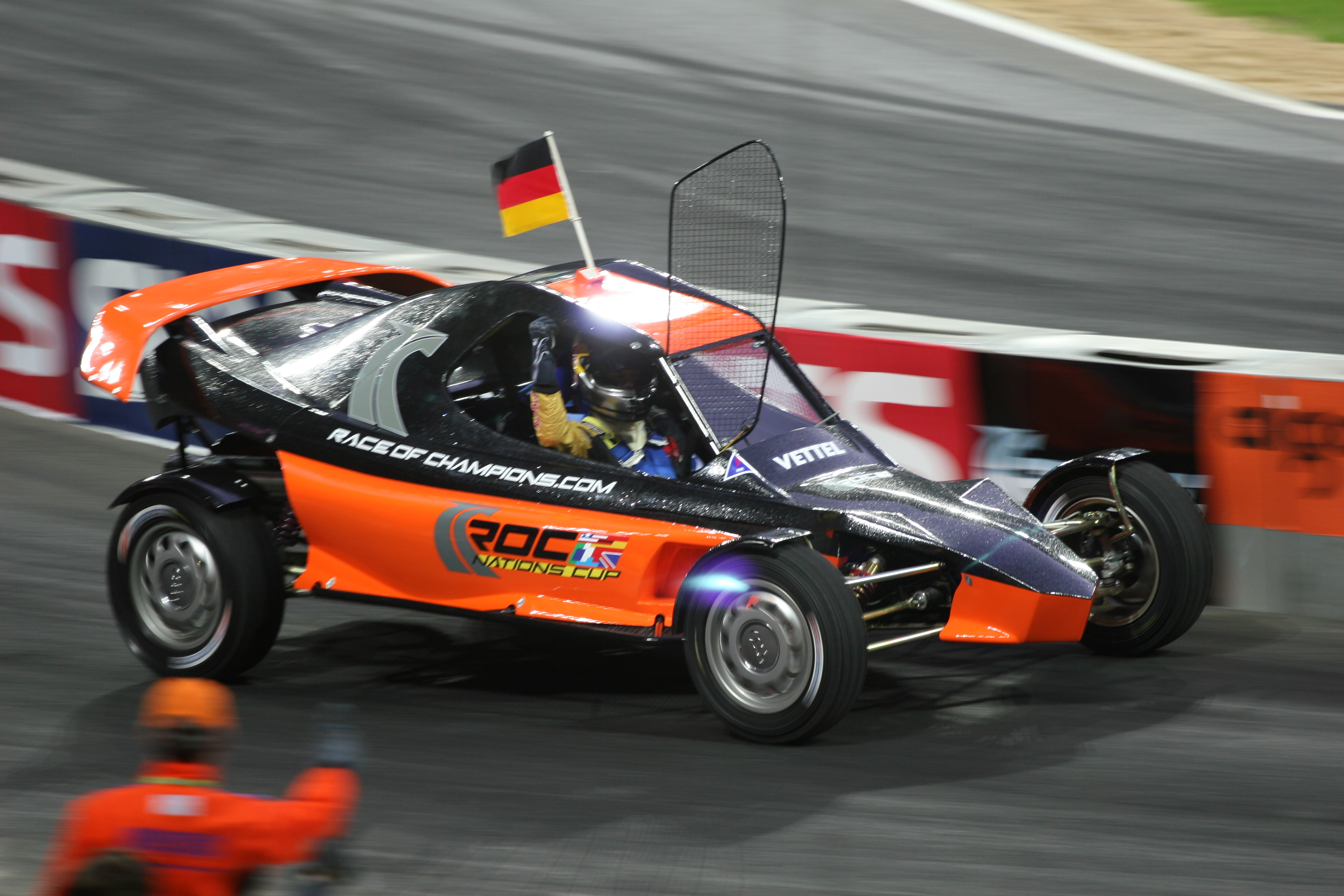
Sebastian Vettel at the 2007 Race of Champions

Vettel competed in the 2007 Race of Champions at Wembley Stadium, representing the German team alongside Michael Schumacher, winning the Nations' Cup title. He also teamed up with Schumacher from 2008 to 2012, winning the Cup on every occasion.

Vettel returned to the 2015 Race of Champions, representing Germany together with Nico Hülkenberg. He won his first individual Race of Champions title that year, beating Tom Kristensen in the final. Vettel and Hülkenberg finished runner-up in the Nations Cup. In 2017, Vettel was eliminated in the first heat for the individual competition, but went on to win the Nations' Cup for Germany by himself with his seventh victory, after his teammate Pascal Wehrlein was injured earlier in a crash.

In the 2019 event, Vettel teamed up with Mick Schumacher, where they finished runners-up in the Nations' Cup to the Nordic team of Kristensen and Johan Kristoffersson. Vettel was eliminated in the group stages of the individual competition, although he won the ROC Skills Challenge. He reached the individual final in 2022 but was beaten by Sébastien Loeb. He also competed into the 2023 and 2025 editions.

== Other ventures ==
=== Activism ===
Vettel has demonstrated an interest in the environment and other social justice issues. Following the 2021 British Grand Prix, he helped remove litter from the stands, and he also worked with children in Austria to build a hotel for bees. A second bee hotel would be erected at the Suzuka International Racing Course ahead of the 2023 Japanese Grand Prix. Furthermore, Vettel has been critical of how F1 races are scheduled, stating that races that are geographically proximate to each other should be held on consecutive weekends to reduce emissions from travelling. He also held an all-women karting event during the weekend of the 2021 Saudi Arabian Grand Prix, and wore the pride flag at the 2021 Hungarian Grand Prix despite being reprimanded. Following the 2022 Russian invasion of Ukraine, Vettel expressed an intent to boycott the September's Russian Grand Prix had the race gone ahead as planned.

In May 2022, Vettel appeared on the BBC One political topical debate programme Question Time to discuss a variety of issues including climate change, energy dependency, and Brexit. The following month, Vettel appeared on the cover of Attitude, voicing support for an LGBTQ driver competing in Formula One. In June 2022, while participating in the Canadian Grand Prix, Vettel denounced Canada's mining of the Alberta oil sands by wearing a T-shirt and helmet patch calling it "Canada's climate crime". Alberta Premier Jason Kenney called it "over-the-top hypocrisy" because Vettel's team, Aston Martin, is sponsored by petroleum company Saudi Aramco, which he said has "one of the worst climate-emissions records in the world". Vettel agreed with the "hypocritical" label but said those personal attacks risk missing what he called the "bigger picture" of the climate crisis.

=== SailGP ===
On 31 May 2023, Vettel announced his involvement with the Germany SailGP Team, as co-owner of the team alongside Thomas Riedel.

== Personal life ==
Vettel lives in Thurgovia, Switzerland, amongst other racing drivers. Vettel has described himself as competitive, private and impatient. He also appeared in advertisements for Head & Shoulders, and provided the voice of character Sebastian Schnell in the German dub of the 2011 film Cars 2, and a voice command assistant in the German and Italian dubs of the 2017 film Cars 3. Vettel is a fan of German football team Eintracht Frankfurt.

Vettel married childhood friend Hanna Prater at a private ceremony in early 2019; they have three children. In 2016, Forbes estimated that his annual income was $41 million. Kimi Räikkönen, his teammate from 2015 to 2018, is a close friend. Besides his native German, Vettel speaks English, French, and Italian. In July 2022, he created his Instagram account, having long eschewed social media. Vettel's first Instagram post was to announce his retirement from Formula One at the end of the 2022 season.

Vettel has spoken of the normality of self-doubt in professional sport and has criticised the stigma around discussing mental health, noting that discussions of mental health should be treated as openly as discussions of physical health.

== Karting record ==
=== Karting career summary ===
Season	Series	Team	Position
1997	DMV Goldpokal — Bambini B	KSN	7th
1997	DMV Bundesmeisterschaft — Bambini B	KSN	1st
1997	DMV Landesmeisterschaft Süd — Bambini B	KSN	1st
1997	NRW Cup — Bambini B	KSN	1st
1998	DMV Winterpokal — Cadet and Bambini	KSN	4th
1998	NRW Cup — Bambini A	KSN	1st
1998	DMV Landesmeisterschaft Süd — Bambini A	KSN	1st
1999	Torneo Industrie Open — 100 Junior		3rd
2000	Andrea Margutti Trophy — 100 Junior		7th
2000	CIK-FIA Green Helmet Trophy – Cadet		7th
2000	German Karting Championship — Junior		5th
2000	Monaco Kart Cup — ICA Junior		22nd
2001	South Garda Winter Cup — ICA Junior		3rd
2001	Andrea Margutti Trophy — ICA Junior	KSN Racing	22nd
2001	European Championship — ICA Junior		1st
2001	German Karting Championship — Junior		1st
2001	Monaco Kart Cup — ICA Junior		1st
2002	European Championship — ICA	KSN Official Racing Team	6th
2002	German Karting Championship — Senior	KSN Official Racing Team	10th

== Racing record ==
=== Racing career summary ===
Season	Series	Team	Races	Wins	Poles	F/Laps	Podiums	Points	Position
2003	Formula BMW ADAC	Eifelland Racing	19	5	5	4	12	216	**2nd**
2004	Formula BMW ADAC	ADAC Berlin-Brandenburg	20	18	14	13	20	387	**1st**
2005	Formula 3 Euro Series	ASL Mücke Motorsport	20	0	0	1	6	63	5th
2005	Masters of Formula 3	ASL Mücke Motorsport	1	0	0	0	0	—N/a	11th
2005	Spanish Formula 3 Championship	Racing Engineering	1	0	0	0	1	8	15th
2005	Macau Grand Prix	ASM F3	1	0	0	0	1	—N/a	**3rd**
2006	Formula 3 Euro Series	ASM Formule 3	20	4	1	5	9	75	**2nd**
2006	Masters of Formula 3	ASM Formule 3	1	0	0	0	0	—N/a	6th
2006	Formula Renault 3.5 Series	Carlin Motorsport	3	1	1	0	2	28	15th
2006	Macau Grand Prix	Carlin Motorsport	1	0	0	0	0	—N/a	23rd
2007	Formula Renault 3.5 Series	Carlin Motorsport	7	1	1	1	4	74	5th
2007	Formula One	BMW Sauber F1 Team	1	0	0	0	0	6	14th
2007	Formula One	Scuderia Toro Rosso	7	0	0	0	0	6	14th
2008	Formula One	Scuderia Toro Rosso	18	1	1	0	1	35	8th
2009	Formula One	Red Bull Racing	17	4	4	3	8	84	**2nd**
2010	Formula One	Red Bull Racing	19	5	10	3	10	256	**1st**
2011	Formula One	Red Bull Racing	19	11	15	3	17	392	**1st**
2012	Formula One	Red Bull Racing	20	5	6	6	10	281	**1st**
2013	Formula One	Infiniti Red Bull Racing	19	13	9	7	16	397	**1st**
2014	Formula One	Infiniti Red Bull Racing	19	0	0	2	4	167	5th
2015	Formula One	Scuderia Ferrari	19	3	1	1	13	278	**3rd**
2016	Formula One	Scuderia Ferrari	21	0	0	3	7	212	4th
2017	Formula One	Scuderia Ferrari	20	5	4	5	13	317	**2nd**
2018	Formula One	Scuderia Ferrari	21	5	5	3	12	320	**2nd**
2019	Formula One	Scuderia Ferrari Mission Winnow	21	1	2	2	9	240	5th
2020	Formula One	Scuderia Ferrari Mission Winnow	17	0	0	0	1	33	13th
2021	Formula One	Aston Martin Cognizant F1 Team	22	0	0	0	1	43	12th
2022	Formula One	Aston Martin Aramco Cognizant F1 Team	20	0	0	0	0	37	12th

=== Complete Formula BMW ADAC results ===
(key) (Races in bold indicate pole position, races in italics indicate fastest lap)

Year	Team	1	2	3	4	5	6	7	8	9	10	11	12	13	14	15	16	17	18	19	20	DC	Points
2003	Eifelland Racing	HOC1; 1 Ret	HOC1; 2; 2	ADR; 1; 1	**ADR**; **2**; 1	NÜR; 1; 3	NÜR; 2; 2	LAU; 1; 6	LAU; 2; 7	NOR; 1 Ret	**NOR**; **2**; 1	**NÜR1**; **1**; 10	**NÜR1**; **2**; 2	**NÜR2**; **1**; 1	NÜR2; 2; 2	A1R; 1; 6	A1R; 2; 8	ZAN; 1 DNS	ZAN; 2; 3	HOC2; 1; 3	HOC2; 2; 1	2nd	216
2004	ADAC Berlin-Brandenburg e.V.	**HOC1**; **1**; 1	**HOC1**; **2**; 1	**ADR**; **1**; 2	**ADR**; **2**; 1	**NÜR1**; **1**; 1	NÜR1; 2; 3	**LAU**; **1**; 1	LAU; 2; 1	**NOR**; **1**; 1	NOR; 2; 1	**NÜR2**; **1**; 1	**NÜR2**; **2**; 1	**OSC**; **1**; 1	**OSC**; **2**; 1	**ZAN**; **1**; 1	**ZAN**; **2**; 1	BRN; 1; 1	**BRN**; **2**; 1	HOC2; 1; 1	**HOC2**; **2**; 1	1st	387

=== Complete Formula 3 Euro Series results ===
(key) (Races in bold indicate pole position, races in italics indicate fastest lap)

Year	Entrant	Chassis	Engine	1	2	3	4	5	6	7	8	9	10	11	12	13	14	15	16	17	18	19	20	DC	Points
2005	ASL Mücke Motorsport	Dallara F305/011	Mercedes	HOC; 1; 15	HOC; 2; 5	PAU; 1; 7	PAU; 2; 11	SPA; 1 DSQ	SPA; 2; 13	MON; 1; 18	MON; 2; 17	OSC; 1; 5	OSC; 2; 5	NOR; 1; 2	NOR; 2; 4	NÜR; 1; 11	NÜR; 2; 2	ZAN; 1; 2	ZAN; 2; 2	LAU; 1; 3	LAU; 2; 15	HOC; 1; 13	HOC; 2; 3	5th	57
2006	ASM Formule 3	Dallara F305/059	Mercedes	HOC; 1; 5	HOC; 2; 1	LAU; 1; 3	LAU; 2; 6	OSC; 1; 5	OSC; 2; 14	BRH; 1; 2	BRH; 2; 7	NOR; 1; 2	NOR; 2 Ret	**NÜR**; **1**; 1	NÜR; 2; 1	ZAN; 1; 24	ZAN; 2; 2	CAT; 1; 1	CAT; 2 Ret	LMS; 1; 9	LMS; 2; 9	HOC; 1; 3	HOC; 2; 12	2nd	75

=== Complete Formula Renault 3.5 Series results ===
(key) (Races in bold indicate pole position, races in italics indicate fastest lap)

Year	Entrant	1	2	3	4	5	6	7	8	9	10	11	12	13	14	15	16	17	DC	Points
2006	Carlin Motorsport	ZOL; 1	ZOL; 2	MON; 1	IST; 1	IST; 2	MIS; 1; 2	**MIS**; **2**; 1	SPA; 1 Ret	SPA; 2 DNS	NÜR; 1	NÜR; 2	DON; 1	DON; 2	LMS; 1	LMS; 2	CAT; 1	CAT; 2	15th	28
2007	Carlin Motorsport	MNZ; 1; 5	MNZ; 2; 3	**NÜR**; **1**; 1	NÜR; 2; 6	MON; 1; 2	HUN; 1; 4	HUN; 2; 3	SPA; 1	SPA; 2	DON; 1	DON; 2	MAG; 1	MAG; 2	EST; 1	EST; 2	CAT; 1	CAT; 2	5th	74

=== Complete Formula One results ===
(key) (Races in bold indicate pole position; races in italics indicate fastest lap)

Year	Entrant	Chassis	Engine	1	2	3	4	5	6	7	8	9	10	11	12	13	14	15	16	17	18	19	20	21	22	WDC	Points
2006	BMW Sauber F1 Team	BMW Sauber F1.06	BMW P86 2.4 V8	BHR	MAL	AUS	SMR	EUR	ESP	MON	GBR	CAN	USA	FRA	GER	HUN	TUR; TD	ITA; TD	CHN; TD	JPN; TD	BRA; TD					–	–
2007	BMW Sauber F1 Team	BMW Sauber F1.07	BMW P86/7 2.4 V8	AUS; TD	MAL; TD	BHR	ESP	MON	CAN	USA; 8	FRA	GBR	EUR													14th	6
2007	Scuderia Toro Rosso	Toro Rosso STR2	Ferrari 056 2.4 V8											HUN; 16	TUR; 19	ITA; 18	BEL; Ret	JPN; Ret	CHN; 4	BRA; Ret						14th	6
2008	Scuderia Toro Rosso	Toro Rosso STR2B	Ferrari 056 2.4 V8	AUS; Ret	MAL; Ret	BHR; Ret	ESP; Ret	TUR; 17																		8th	35
2008	Scuderia Toro Rosso	Toro Rosso STR3	Ferrari 056 2.4 V8						MON; 5	CAN; 8	FRA; 12	GBR; Ret	GER; 8	HUN; Ret	EUR; 6	BEL; 5	**ITA**; 1	SIN; 5	JPN; 6	CHN; 9	BRA; 4					8th	35
2009	Red Bull Racing	Red Bull RB5	Renault RS27-2009 2.4 V8	AUS; 13^{†}	MAL; 15^{†}	**CHN**; 1	BHR; 2	ESP; 4	MON; Ret	**TUR**; 3	**GBR**; 1	GER; 2	HUN; Ret	EUR; Ret	BEL; 3	ITA; 8	SIN; 4	**JPN**; 1	BRA; 4	ABU; 1						2nd	84
2010	Red Bull Racing	Red Bull RB6	Renault RS27-2010 2.4 V8	**BHR**; 4	**AUS**; Ret	MAL; 1	**CHN**; 6	ESP; 3	MON; 2	TUR; Ret	CAN; 4	**EUR**; 1	**GBR**; 7	**GER**; 3	**HUN**; 3	BEL; 15	ITA; 4	SIN; 2	**JPN**; 1	**KOR**; Ret	BRA; 1	**ABU**; 1				1st	256
2011	Red Bull Racing	Red Bull RB7	Renault RS27-2011 2.4 V8	**AUS**; 1	**MAL**; 1	**CHN**; 2	**TUR**; 1	ESP; 1	**MON**; 1	**CAN**; 2	**EUR**; 1	GBR; 2	GER; 4	**HUN**; 2	**BEL**; 1	**ITA**; 1	**SIN**; 1	**JPN**; 3	KOR; 1	**IND**; 1	**ABU**; Ret	**BRA**; 2				1st	392
2012	Red Bull Racing	Red Bull RB8	Renault RS27-2012 2.4 V8	AUS; 2	MAL; 11	CHN; 5	**BHR**; 1	ESP; 6	MON; 4	**CAN**; 4	**EUR**; Ret	GBR; 3	GER; 5	HUN; 4	BEL; 2	ITA; 22^{†}	SIN; 1	**JPN**; 1	KOR; 1	**IND**; 1	ABU; 3	**USA**; 2	BRA; 6			1st	281
2013	Infiniti Red Bull Racing	Red Bull RB9	Renault RS27-2013 2.4 V8	**AUS**; 3	**MAL**; 1	CHN; 4	BHR; 1	ESP; 4	MON; 2	**CAN**; 1	GBR; Ret	GER; 1	HUN; 3	BEL; 1	**ITA**; 1	**SIN**; 1	**KOR**; 1	JPN; 1	**IND**; 1	ABU; 1	**USA**; 1	**BRA**; 1				1st	397
2014	Infiniti Red Bull Racing	Red Bull RB10	Renault Energy F1‑2014 1.6 V6 t	AUS; Ret	MAL; 3	BHR; 6	CHN; 5	ESP; 4	MON; Ret	CAN; 3	AUT; Ret	GBR; 5	GER; 4	HUN; 7	BEL; 5	ITA; 6	SIN; 2	JPN; 3	RUS; 8	USA; 7	BRA; 5	ABU; 8				5th	167
2015	Scuderia Ferrari	Ferrari SF15-T	Ferrari 060 1.6 V6 t	AUS; 3	MAL; 1	CHN; 3	BHR; 5	ESP; 3	MON; 2	CAN; 5	AUT; 4	GBR; 3	HUN; 1	BEL; 12^{†}	ITA; 2	**SIN**; 1	JPN; 3	RUS; 2	USA; 3	MEX; Ret	BRA; 3	ABU; 4				3rd	278
2016	Scuderia Ferrari	Ferrari SF16-H	Ferrari 061 1.6 V6 t	AUS; 3	BHR; DNS	CHN; 2	RUS; Ret	ESP; 3	MON; 4	CAN; 2	EUR; 2	AUT; Ret	GBR; 9	HUN; 4	GER; 5	BEL; 6	ITA; 3	SIN; 5	MAL; Ret	JPN; 4	USA; 4	MEX; 5	BRA; 5	ABU; 3		4th	212
2017	Scuderia Ferrari	Ferrari SF70H	Ferrari 062 1.6 V6 t	AUS; 1	CHN; 2	BHR; 1	**RUS**; 2	ESP; 2	MON; 1	CAN; 4	AZE; 4	AUT; 2	GBR; 7	**HUN**; 1	BEL; 2	ITA; 3	**SIN**; Ret	MAL; 4	JPN; Ret	USA; 2	**MEX**; 4	BRA; 1	ABU; 3			2nd	317
2018	Scuderia Ferrari	Ferrari SF71H	Ferrari 062 EVO 1.6 V6 t	AUS; 1	**BHR**; 1	**CHN**; 8	**AZE**; 4	ESP; 4	MON; 2	**CAN**; 1	FRA; 5	AUT; 3	GBR; 1	**GER**; Ret	HUN; 2	BEL; 1	ITA; 4	SIN; 3	RUS; 3	JPN; 6	USA; 4	MEX; 2	BRA; 6	ABU; 2		2nd	320
2019	Scuderia Ferrari Mission Winnow	Ferrari SF90	Ferrari 064 1.6 V6 t	AUS; 4	BHR; 5	CHN; 3	AZE; 3	ESP; 4	MON; 2	**CAN**; 2	FRA; 5	AUT; 4	GBR; 16	GER; 2	HUN; 3	BEL; 4	ITA; 13	SIN; 1	RUS; Ret	**JPN**; 2	MEX; 2	USA; Ret	BRA; 17^{†}	ABU; 5		5th	240
2020	Scuderia Ferrari Mission Winnow	Ferrari SF1000	Ferrari 065 1.6 V6 t	AUT; 10	STY; Ret	HUN; 6	GBR; 10	70A; 12	ESP; 7	BEL; 13	ITA; Ret	TUS; 10	RUS; 13	EIF; 11	POR; 10	EMI; 12	TUR; 3	BHR; 13	SKH; 12	ABU; 14						13th	33
2021	Aston Martin Cognizant F1 Team	Aston Martin AMR21	Mercedes-AMG F1 M12 1.6 V6 t	BHR; 15	EMI; 15†	POR; 13	ESP; 13	MON; 5	AZE; 2	FRA; 9	STY; 12	AUT; 17†	GBR; Ret	HUN; DSQ	BEL; 5‡	NED; 13	ITA; 12	RUS; 12	TUR; 18	USA; 10	MXC; 7	SAP; 11	QAT; 10	SAU; Ret	ABU; 11	12th	43
2022	Aston Martin Aramco Cognizant F1 Team	Aston Martin AMR22	Mercedes F1 M13 E Performance 1.6 V6 t	BHR	SAU	AUS; Ret	EMI; 8	MIA; 17†	ESP; 11	MON; 10	AZE; 6	CAN; 12	GBR; 9	AUT; 17	FRA; 11	HUN; 10	BEL; 8	NED; 14	ITA; Ret	SIN; 8	JPN; 6	USA; 8	MXC; 14	SAP; 11	ABU; 10	12th	37

^{†} Did not finish, but was classified as he had completed more than 90% of the race distance.
^{‡} Half points awarded as less than 75% of race distance was completed.

=== Formula One records ===
Vettel holds the following Formula One records:

Record		Achieved	Ref
**Most consecutive grand slams**	2	2013 Singapore Grand Prix and 2013 Korean Grand Prix (Note: Record shared with Alberto Ascari and Jim Clark.)	
**Most pole positions in a season**	15	2011	
**Youngest World Drivers' Championship runner-up**	22 years, 121 days	2009 season (1 November 2009)	
**Shortest time elapsed before earning a penalty**	6 seconds	2006 Turkish Grand Prix (25 August 2006) (6 seconds into his career, for speeding in the pit lane)	

Footnotes

== Notes ==
Sporting positions
Preceded by Maximilian Götz	Formula BMW ADAC Champion; 2004	Succeeded by Nico Hülkenberg
Preceded by Jenson Button	Formula One World Champion; 2010, 2011, 2012, 2013	Succeeded by Lewis Hamilton
Preceded by Heikki Kovalainen; Marcus Grönholm	Race of Champions Nations' Cup; 2007, 2008, 2009, 2010, 2011, 2012; With: Michael Schumacher	Succeeded by Tom Kristensen; Petter Solberg (2014)
Preceded by David Coulthard	Race of Champions; Champion of Champions; 2015	Succeeded by Juan Pablo Montoya (2017)
Preceded by Jason Plato; Andy Priaulx (2015)	Race of Champions Nations' Cup; 2017; With: Pascal Wehrlein	Succeeded by Timo Bernhard; René Rast
Awards and achievements
Preceded by Lewis Hamilton	Autosport Awards; Rookie of the Year; 2008	Succeeded by Kris Meeke
Preceded by Robert Kubica	Lorenzo Bandini Trophy; 2009	Succeeded by Lewis Hamilton
Preceded by Kimi Räikkönen	DHL Fastest Lap Award; 2009	Succeeded by Fernando Alonso
Preceded by Paul Biedermann	German Sportsman of the Year; 2010	Succeeded by Dirk Nowitzki
Preceded by Mark Webber	DHL Fastest Lap Award; 2012, 2013	Succeeded by Lewis Hamilton
Preceded by Jenson Button	Autosport Awards; International Racing Driver of the Year; 2010, 2011, 2012, 2013	Succeeded by Lewis Hamilton
Preceded by Usain Bolt	BBC Overseas Sports Personality of the Year; 2013	Succeeded by Cristiano Ronaldo
Preceded by Usain Bolt	Laureus World Sportsman of the Year; 2014	Succeeded by Novak Djokovic
Records
Preceded by Jenson Button; 20 years, 67 days (2000 Brazilian GP)	Youngest driver to score points in Formula One; 19 years, 349 days (2007 United States Grand Prix)	Succeeded by Daniil Kvyat; 19 years, 324 days (2014 Australian GP)
Preceded by Fernando Alonso; 21 years, 237 days (2003 Malaysian GP)	Youngest race leader, for at least one lap in Formula One; 20 years, 89 days (2007 Japanese Grand Prix)	Succeeded by Max Verstappen; 18 years, 228 days (2016 Spanish GP)
Preceded by Fernando Alonso; 21 years, 236 days (2003 Malaysian GP)	Youngest Grand Prix polesitter 21 years, 73 days (2008 Italian Grand Prix)	Succeeded by Kimi Antonelli; 19 years, 201 days (2026 Chinese GP)
Preceded by Fernando Alonso; 21 years, 237 days (2003 Malaysian GP)	Youngest driver to score a podium position in Formula One; 21 years, 73 days (2008 Italian Grand Prix)	Succeeded by Max Verstappen; 18 years, 228 days (2016 Spanish GP)
Preceded by Fernando Alonso; 22 years, 26 days (2003 Hungarian GP)	Youngest Grand Prix winner 21 years, 73 days (2008 Italian Grand Prix)	Succeeded by Max Verstappen; 18 years, 228 days (2016 Spanish GP)
Preceded by Lewis Hamilton; 22 years, 287 days (2007 season)	Youngest Formula One; World Drivers' Championship runner-up 22 years, 121 days (2009 season)	Incumbent
Preceded by Lewis Hamilton; 23 years, 300 days (2008 season)	Youngest Formula One; World Drivers' Champion; 23 years, 134 days (2010 season)	Succeeded by Kimi Antonelli; 20 years, 68 days (2026 season)
Preceded by Ayrton Senna; 25 years, 31 days (1985 Portuguese GP)	Youngest driver to complete a grand slam in Formula One; 24 years, 119 days (2011 Indian Grand Prix)	Succeeded by Max Verstappen; 23 years, 277 days (2021 Austrian GP)
