= British Women Racing Drivers Club =

The British Women Racing Drivers Club (BWRDC) is a membership-based body which represents the interests of professional women racing drivers from the United Kingdom. The BWRDC celebrated its 50th anniversary in 2012. It holds its own awards and championships based on its members' performances. The awards are given at an annual ceremony.

The BWRDC was founded in 1962 by Mary Wheeler, with 30 members. Women were not allowed to join the British Racing Drivers' Club until 1992. In 2012 the BWRDC had 160 members.
