= British Racing Drivers' Club =

Private club for distinguished motor racing drivers from the UK or British Commonwealth

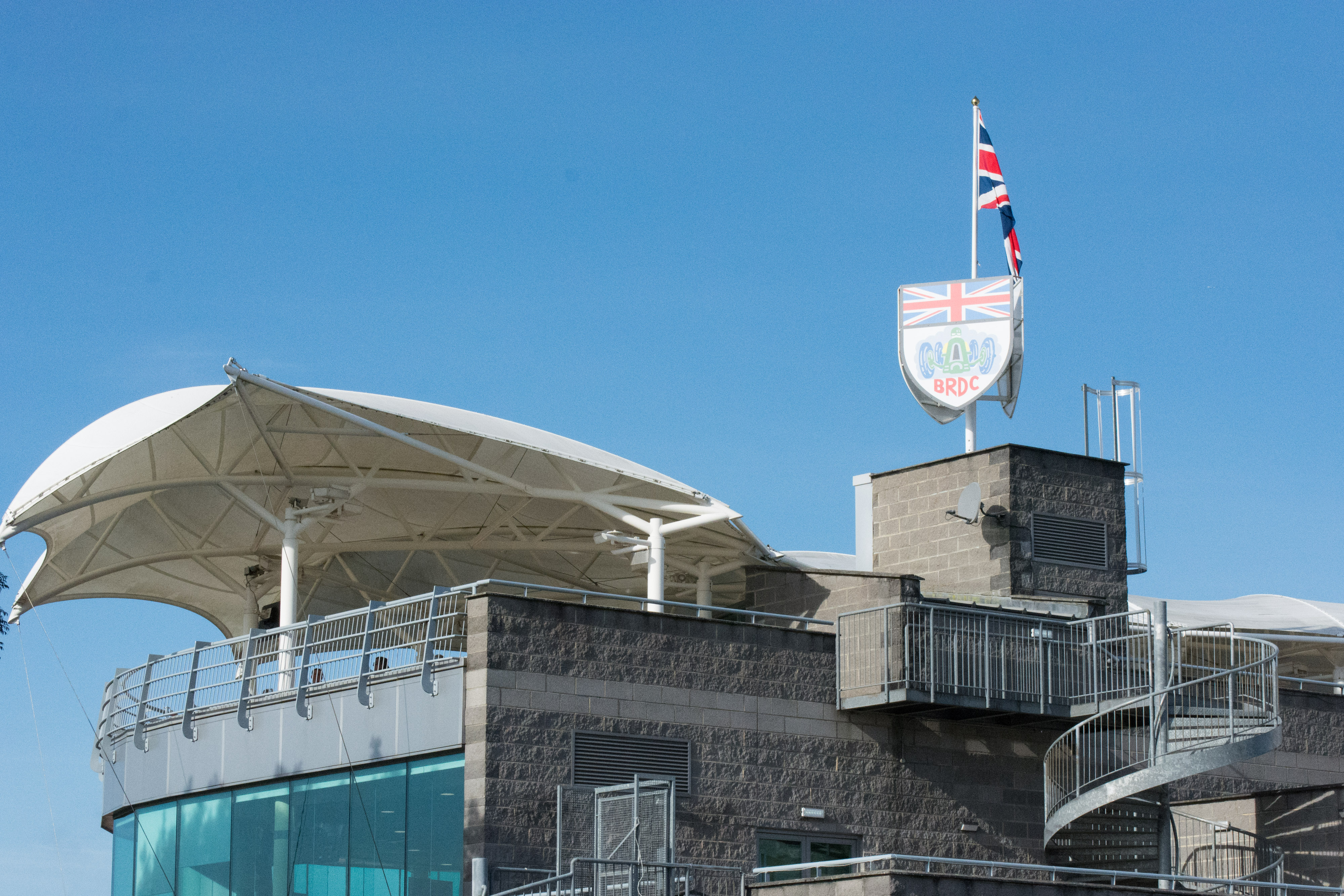
The clubhouse at Silverstone in 2008

The British Racing Drivers' Club (BRDC) is an invitation-only members club for racecar drivers who are judged to have achieved success in the upper levels of motorsport for a number of seasons. Except under exceptional circumstances, members must have been born in the United Kingdom or Commonwealth. The BRDC owns and operates Silverstone Circuit in the United Kingdom.

== Early days ==
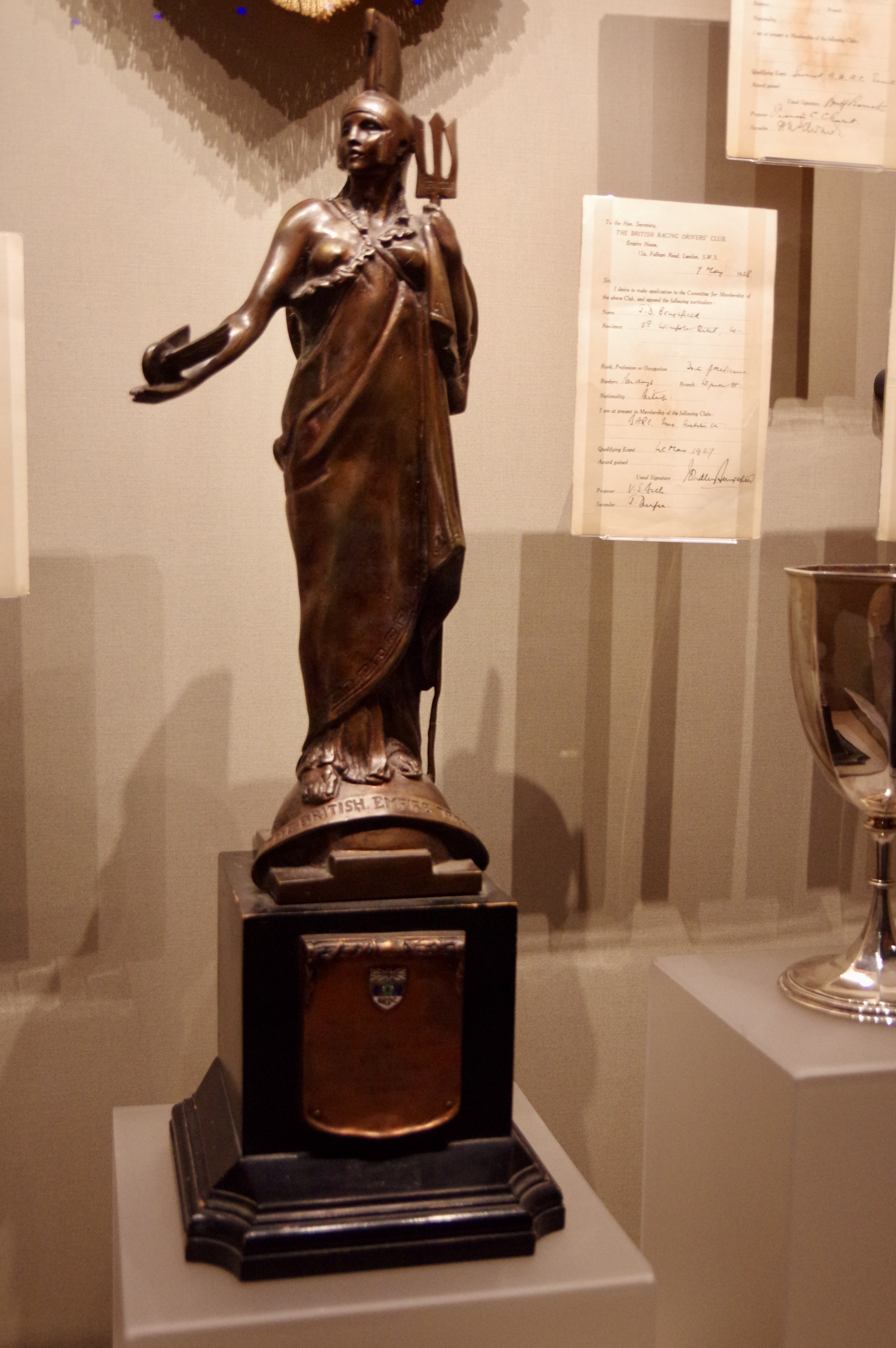
BRDC-500 trophy between 1929 and 1937.

The club was founded in April 1928 by Dr. J. Dudley Benjafield, one of an informal group of British racing drivers known as the "Bentley Boys". The BRDC began primarily as a socialising club for Benjafield and his fellow drivers, but by the time of its inauguration, its 25 members had devised a set of objectives for the club:

- To promote the interests of motor sport generally.
- To celebrate any specific achievement in motor sport.
- To extend hospitality to racing drivers from overseas.
- To further the interests of British drivers competing abroad.

In 1929, the BRDC became involved in the promotion and organisation of racing events. Its first event was the BRDC 500-Mile Race at Brooklands on 12 October of that year, a race won by a Bentley 4½ Litre, unsupercharged, owned and driven by Bentley-dealer Jack Barclay and Le Mans-winner F.C. Clement. The event was such a success that the 1930 event, scheduled for 4 October, was accorded International status. The Earl of March and S.C.H. Davis won the event outright in an Austin Seven.

From June 1935 the BRDC published the monthly magazine Speed. The final issue was April 1939, after which it was incorporated into its rival Motor Sport.

== World War II and aftermath ==
Members who died or were killed during the Second World War included: Cecil Kimber (a vice-president), The 6th Earl of Cottenham, A.V. Ebblewhite, Hugh P. McConnell, T.E. Rose Richards, J.P. Wakefield, E.K. Rayson, G.L. Baker, John Carr, Percy Maclure, A.F.P. Fane, B.P.W. Twist, R.O. Shuttleworth, C.S. Staniland, N.G. Wilson, H.E. Symons, R.P. Hichens, J.A. Driskell, and Lionel Martin.

After the war the club opened a "Le Mans Fund," for the benefit of the Automobile Club de l'Ouest, raising a grand total of £358 and 11 shillings, to assist with the rehabilitation of the facilities at the Le Mans circuit. "It will be remembered that these installations were almost completely destroyed during the war, mainly by Allied bombing."

== Membership status ==
In the modern era full membership status is offered only to those who are judged to have been successful at an international level for a number of seasons. Full membership has been awarded to every British or Commonwealth Formula One World Champion. Associate status is awarded to those who have made a significant contribution to motor sport. Honorary membership may be awarded in special cases, such as a notable World Champion who may not otherwise qualify. Membership is only open to British or Commonwealth drivers however Irish drivers who were born in the Irish Free State or the Republic of Ireland before 1950 would be considered British by the club and eligible for membership. This rule allowed for Eddie Jordan to join the club. Once invited to join, prospective members must be proposed and seconded by existing members, then in turn, approved by the existing membership, board of directors and BRDC President.

The BRDC's membership was initially restricted to experienced and successful male drivers, and was by invitation only. When Le Mans-winner John Duff joined the club in 1935 he was proposed and seconded by existing members. However James Robertson Justice was a member of the club, with a limited track record.

In 1946 eligibility was described thus: "It is pointed out that, normally, membership is confined to gentlemen who have competed in an open motor road-racing event or taken a first, second or third place award in a Brooklands Automobile Racing Club's Meeting. Every candidate must be proposed by one and seconded by another member of the club, to both of whom he is personally known."

Women have been elected Honorary Member of the Club since 1928 (when Jill Scott was inducted), however it was not until 1994 that they were able to become Full Members. As a consequence, the British Women Racing Drivers Club was founded in 1962 by Mary Wheeler.

== Race promotion and circuit ownership ==
In the post-war era, the BRDC expanded its activities, taking over the lease of Silverstone from the RAC in 1952. In 1966, the club formed a subsidiary company, Silverstone Circuits Limited, responsible for the development of the British Grand Prix and – after its purchase in 1971 – the circuit itself. Aside from the GP, other notable BRDC-organised events at Silverstone included the BRDC International Trophy.

In recent years, Silverstone and the British GP have become an ongoing contentious issue between the BRDC board and Bernie Ecclestone's Formula One Management, with differences of opinion over the costs involved and the state of the circuit's infrastructure.

Also within the remit of the club are:

- The BRDC Marshals' Club.
- BRDC Club Races.
- BRDC 500 Summer Races.
- The BRDC Walter Hayes Trophy.

== Young driver support ==
The support and development of young British drivers has become an important part of the BRDC's existence, not least with its involvement in the annual Aston Martin Autosport BRDC Award to honour and promote a young driver from a British championship who, in the eyes of the judges, shows the most talent and potential. Among the BRDC's promotional and developmental schemes is the Stars of Tomorrow karting championship. The BRDC also provides financial backing to selected young British drivers competing in junior formulae.

In 2008, the BRDC announced the creation of its SuperStars program, designed to advise and financially support Britain's most promising young drivers. 1992 BTCC champion Tim Harvey was appointed Director of the program. The current director is Andy Meyrick.

=== 2022 BRDC Superstars ===
Driver	Series
Oliver Bearman	FIA Formula 3 Championship; Formula Regional Asian Championship
Luke Browning	GB3 Championship; Formula 4 UAE Championship
Jonny Edgar	FIA Formula 3 Championship
Tom Gamble	European Le Mans Series; Asian Le Mans Series; IMSA SportsCar Championship
Philip Hanson	FIA World Endurance Championship; European Le Mans Series; Asian Le Mans Series
Daniel Harper	GT World Challenge Europe Endurance Cup; Nürburgring Endurance Series
Jake Hill	British Touring Car Championship
Harry King	Porsche Supercup; Porsche Carrera Cup Benelux
Sebastian Priaulx	FIA World Endurance Championship; IMSA SportsCar Championship; IMSA Prototype Challenge; GT World Challenge Europe Endurance Cup
Matthew Rees	GB3 Championship
Zak O'Sullivan	FIA Formula 3 Championship
Dan Ticktum	Formula E World Championship
Ben Tuck	Nürburgring Endurance Series

== Significant people ==
In the recent past the Club Presidency has been held by former Formula One world champions Sir Jackie Stewart and Damon Hill. As of July 2019, former F1 driver David Coulthard is the president of the BRDC, having replaced Paddy Hopkirk.

The club's current chairman is Peter Digby, since 2022. The position has recently been held by former touring car driver Stuart Rolt, (from 2005 to 2008 and from 2010 to 2012) and Robert Brooks, chairman of Bonhams auctioneers, from 2008 to 2010.

=== Presidents of the BRDC ===
Years	Incumbent
2019–Present	David Coulthard
2017–2019	Paddy Hopkirk
2011–2017	Derek Warwick
2006–2011	Damon Hill
2000–2006	Jackie Stewart
2000	Ken Tyrrell
1993–2000	Lord Alexander Hesketh
1992–1993	Innes Ireland
1991–1992	Jack Sears
1964–1991	Gerald Lascelles
1929–1964	Earl Howe
1928–1929	Dudley Benjafield

== See also ==
- Automobile Club de l'Ouest
- British Automobile Racing Club
- British Racing and Sports Car Club
- British Women Racing Drivers Club
