= 2014 Race of Champions =

Seasons
- ← 2013 2015 →

The 2014 Race of Champions was the 26th running of the event, and took place over 13–14 December 2014 at Bushy Park circuit in Barbados. The Nations' Cup was won by the Nordic team of Tom Kristensen and Petter Solberg, while the individual contest was won by David Coulthard, who beat Pascal Wehrlein 2–0 in the final. Barbados won the inaugural ROC Caribbean competition.

== Participants ==
The reigning Champion of Champions, Romain Grosjean, was invited to take part, along with the last edition's defeated finalist, nine-time Le Mans winner Tom Kristensen. Grosjean was the only active Formula One race driver to take part, although Williams test driver Susie Wolff, GP2 champion Jolyon Palmer, Mercedes test driver Pascal Wehrlein and European F3 champion Esteban Ocon all had experience of Formula One machinery, while David Coulthard was a 13-time Grand Prix winner.

Other champions participating included José María López (WTCC), Ryan Hunter-Reay (IndyCar), Jamie Whincup (V8 Supercars), Petter Solberg (WRC and World Rallycross), Kurt Busch (NASCAR) and Mick Doohan (MotoGP).

López, Ocon, Wolff, Busch, Palmer and Wehrlein all made their Race of Champions debuts, along with the eight ROC Caribbean drivers, while Solberg and Robby Gordon both returned after lengthy absences.

For the first time since the inception of the Nations' Cup event in 1999, there was no German team, Wehrlein the sole German representative in attendance. This means that there was guaranteed to be a non-German winning team for the first time since 2006. The French, United States and Nordic (as Scandinavia) teams were the only former victors participating, while Argentina and Barbados gained representation for the first time.

=== Nations' Cup ===
Country	Drivers	2014 series
Americas	(United States) Robby Gordon	Dakar Rally, Baja 1000, Stadium Super Trucks
Americas	(Argentina) José María López	World Touring Car Championship
Australia	Jamie Whincup	V8 Supercars
Australia	Mick Doohan	none
Barbados	Rhett Watson	Barbados Rally Club
Barbados	Dane Skeete	Barbados Rally Club
France	Romain Grosjean	Formula One
France	Esteban Ocon	European Formula Three
Nordic	(Denmark) Tom Kristensen	World Endurance Championship
Nordic	(Norway) Petter Solberg	World Rallycross Championship
United Kingdom	David Coulthard	none
United Kingdom	Susie Wolff	none
United States	Kurt Busch	NASCAR Sprint Cup
United States	Ryan Hunter-Reay	IndyCar Series
Young Stars	(United Kingdom) Jolyon Palmer	GP2 Series
Young Stars	(Germany) Pascal Wehrlein	Deutsche Tourenwagen Masters

=== ROC Caribbean ===
Country	Drivers
Barbados	Rhett Watson
Barbados	Dane Skeete
Jamaica	Doug Gore
Jamaica	Jeffrey Panton
Guyana	Kristian Jeffrey
Guyana	Mark Vieira
Trinidad and Tobago	Franklyn Boodram
Trinidad and Tobago	David Coelho

- As the fastest Barbadian and non-Barbadian respectively, Rhett Watson and Doug Gore advanced to the main competition.

== Cars ==
Seven vehicles were used throughout the event. The Ariel Atom Cup, Stadium Super Truck and Volkswagen Polo RX car made their debut, while the Toyota GT-86, Lamborghini Gallardo Super Trofeo and Volkswagen Scirocco were all dropped.

- Ariel Atom Cup
- Audi R8 LMS
- KTM X-Bow
- Chevrolet Camaro (Whelen Euro Series)
- ROC Car
- Stadium Super Truck
- Volkswagen Polo RX

== Nations Cup ==
Drivers who made a false start or hit a wall are marked with a yellow card (yellow card) in the tables, and a time penalty of 5 seconds was added to their original time.

=== Group A ===
Pos.	Team	Wins	Losses	Combined Time	Driver	Wins	Losses	Best Time
1	(Denmark) (Norway) Nordic	4	2	3:29.0632	Tom Kristensen	2	1	1:44.4438
1	(Denmark) (Norway) Nordic	4	2	3:29.0632	Petter Solberg	2	1	1:44.6194
2	France	3	3	3:31.6116	Romain Grosjean	2	1	1:43.0110
2	France	3	3	3:31.6116	Esteban Ocon	1	2	1:48.6005
3	(United Kingdom) (Germany) Young Stars	3	3	3:31.7359	Pascal Wehrlein	2	1	1:45.7331
3	(United Kingdom) (Germany) Young Stars	3	3	3:31.7359	Jolyon Palmer	1	2	1:46.0082
4	(Argentina) (United States) Americas	2	4	3:31.1187	Robby Gordon	2	1	1:46.0544
4	(Argentina) (United States) Americas	2	4	3:31.1187	José María López	0	3	1:45.0423

Team 1	Time 1	Score	Team 2	Time 2
France		0–2	(Denmark) (Norway) Nordic	
E. Ocon	1:48.6005	Euro Racecar	T. Kristensen	1:44.4438
R. Grosjean	1:52.1902 (yellow card)	ROC Car	P. Solberg	1:48.7757
(Argentina) (United States) Americas		1–1	(United Kingdom) (Germany) Young Stars	
R. Gordon	1:46.1000	Euro Racecar	Jolyon Palmer	1:51.6000 (yellow card)
J.M. López	DNF (yellow card)	ROC Car	P. Wehrlein	1:47.0281
(United Kingdom) (Germany) Young Stars		1–1	France	
J. Palmer	1:46.0082	Ariel Atom Cup	E. Ocon	1:51.0809
P. Wehrlein	1:45.7331	Ariel Atom Cup	R. Grosjean	1:43.0110

Team 1	Time 1	Score	Team 2	Time 2
(Denmark) (Norway) Nordic		1–1	(Argentina) (United States) Americas	
T. Kristensen	1:46.6362	Ariel Atom Cup	R. Gordon	1:46.0544
P. Solberg	1:44.6194	KTM X-Bow	J.M. López	1:45.0423
(Denmark) (Norway) Nordic		1–1	(United Kingdom) (Germany) Young Stars	
T. Kristensen	1:46.1651	ROC Car	J. Palmer	1:58.2733 (yellow card) (yellow card)
P. Solberg	2:07.3837 (yellow card)	Stadium Super Truck	P. Wehrlein	2:00.5131
France		2–0	(Argentina) (United States) Americas	
E. Ocon	1:51.1564	ROC Car	R. Gordon	1:54.4713 (yellow card)
R. Grosjean	1:57.0676 (yellow card)	Stadium Super Truck	J.M. López	DNF (yellow card)

=== Group B ===
Pos.	Team	Wins	Losses	Combined Time	Driver	Wins	Losses	Best Time
1	United Kingdom	5	1	3:26.5556	David Coulthard	3	0	1:38.4714
1	United Kingdom	5	1	3:26.5556	Susie Wolff	2	1	1:48.0841
2	Barbados	3	3	3:29.5150	Dane Skeete	2	1	1:47.2753
2	Barbados	3	3	3:29.5150	Rhett Watson	1	2	1:42.2396
3	United States	3	3	3:30.4830	Ryan Hunter-Reay	2	1	1:48.1785
3	United States	3	3	3:30.4830	Kurt Busch	1	2	1:43.3044
4	Australia	1	5	3:30.0879	Jamie Whincup	1	2	1:41.5636
4	Australia	1	5	3:30.0879	Mick Doohan	0	3	1:48.5242

Team 1	Time 1	Score	Team 2	Time 2
Australia		0–2	United Kingdom	
M. Doohan	1:48.5242	KTM X-Bow	S. Wolff	1:48.0841 (yellow card)
J. Whincup	1:41.5636	Audi R8 LMS	D. Coulthard	1:38.4714
Barbados		2–0	United States	
D. Skeete	1:47.2753	KTM X-Bow	R. Hunter-Reay	1:48.4435
R. Watson	1:42.2396	Audi R8 LMS	K. Busch	1:42.3044
United States		2–0	Australia	
R. Hunter-Reay	1:48.1785	Ariel Atom Cup	M. Doohan	1:52.4585
K. Busch	1:44.6182 (yellow card)	KTM X-Bow	J. Whincup	1:46.1911

Team 1	Time 1	Score	Team 2	Time 2
United Kingdom		2–0	Barbados	
S. Wolff	1:49.3684	Ariel Atom Cup	D. Skeete	1:55.8156
D. Coulthard	1:46.6461 (yellow card)	KTM X-Bow	R. Watson	1:47.6985 (yellow card)
United Kingdom		1–1	United States	
S. Wolff	1:53.0218	ROC Car	R. Hunter-Reay	1:50.8114
D. Coulthard	1:44:4070 (yellow card)	Ariel Atom Cup	K. Busch	1:46.4527
Barbados		1–1	Australia	
D. Skeete	1:47.5483	ROC Car	M. Doohan	1:50.6819
R. Watson	1:58.4690	Ariel Atom Cup	J. Whincup	1:45.7808

=== Knockout stage ===
Semi-finals
(Denmark) (Norway) Nordic	2
France	1
United Kingdom	2
Barbados	1

Final
(Denmark) (Norway) Nordic	2
United Kingdom	1

==== Semifinals ====
Team 1	Time 1	Car	Team 2	Time 2
(Denmark) (Norway) Nordic		2–1	France	
Tom Kristensen	1:45.3986	Ariel Atom Cup	Esteban Ocon	1:48.0754
Petter Solberg	1:39.6318	Audi R8 LMS	Romain Grosjean	1:37.9993
Tom Kristensen	1:32.3916	KTM X-Bow	Romain Grosjean	1:46.6444
United Kingdom		2–1	Barbados	
Susie Wolff	1:44.5943	Audi R8 LMS	Dane Skeete	1:42.5656
David Coulthard	1:34.9861	Volkswagen Polo RX	Rhett Watson	1:38.3667
David Coulthard	1:42:1432	KTM X-Bow	Dane Skeete	DNF

==== Finals ====
Team 1	Time 1	Car	Team 2	Time 2
(Denmark) (Norway) Nordic		2–1	United Kingdom	
Tom Kristensen	1:39.1757	Audi R8 LMS	Susie Wolff	1:43.3748
Petter Solberg	1:35.3158	Volkswagen Polo RX	David Coulthard	1:33.0999
Tom Kristensen	1:45.1237	Ariel Atom Cup	David Coulthard	1:48.0739

== ROC Caribbean ==
=== Group stage ===
Pos.	Team	Wins	Losses	Combined Time	Driver	Wins	Losses	Best Time
1	Jamaica	5	1	3:23.7386	Doug Gore	3	0	1:39.9727
1	Jamaica	5	1	3:23.7386	Jeffrey Panton	2	1	1:43.7659
2	Barbados	4	2	3:22.7315	Dane Skeete	2	1	1:35.7346
2	Barbados	4	2	3:22.7315	Rhett Watson	2	1	1:46.9968
3	Guyana	2	4	3:37.0557	Kristian Jeffrey	1	2	1:52.8760
3	Guyana	2	4	3:37.0557	Mark Vieira	1	2	1:44.1797
4	Trinidad and Tobago	1	5	3:49.0354	Franklyn Boodram	0	3	1:57.7000
4	Trinidad and Tobago	1	5	3:49.0354	David Coelho	1	2	1:51.3354

=== Final ===
Driver 1	Time 1	Car	Driver 2	Time 2
Jamaica		0–2	Barbados	
Doug Gore	1:49.8270 (yellow card)	ROC Car	Dane Skeete	1:49.5348 (yellow card)
Jeffrey Panton	2:06.7780	Radical	Rhett Watson	1:41.3595

== Race of Champions ==
=== Group A ===
Pos.	Team	Wins	Losses	Best Time
1	(United Kingdom) David Coulthard	3	0	1:44.8446
2	(Australia) Jamie Whincup	2	1	1:47.2690
3	(France) Romain Grosjean	1	2	1:45.3844
4	(Australia) Mick Doohan	0	3	1:48.0281

Driver 1	Time 1	Car	Driver 2	Time 2
(France) R. Grosjean	1:47.7303	ROC Car	(Australia) M. Doohan	1:48.0281
(Australia) J. Whincup	1:51.6425 (yellow card) (yellow card)	ROC Car	(United Kingdom) D. Coulthard	1:47.4247
(United Kingdom) D. Coulthard	1:44.8446	Ariel Atom Cup	(France) R. Grosjean	1:45.3844
(Australia) M. Doohan	1:48.6375 (yellow card)	Ariel Atom Cup	(Australia) J. Whincup	1:47.2690
(United Kingdom) D. Coulthard	2:03.8327	Stadium Super Truck	(Australia) M. Doohan	2:14.5405 (yellow card) (yellow card)
(France) R. Grosjean	2:01.4502 (yellow card) (yellow card)	Stadium Super Truck	(Australia) J. Whincup	1:55.8265

=== Group B ===
Pos.	Team	Wins	Losses	Best Time
1	(United States) Kurt Busch	3	0	1:45.4474
2	(Norway) Petter Solberg	2	1	1:47.8957
3	(Barbados) Rhett Watson	1	2	1:47.8957
4	(United Kingdom) Susie Wolff	0	3	1:46.0178

Driver 1	Time 1	Car	Driver 2	Time 2
(Norway) P. Solberg	1:46.1249	Euro Racecar	(Barbados) R. Watson	1:51.4913
(United States) K. Busch	1:47.0683 (yellow card)	Euro Racecar	(United Kingdom) S. Wolff	1:59.9363 (yellow card) (yellow card)
(United Kingdom) S. Wolff	1:46.0178	KTM X-Bow	(Norway) P. Solberg	1:45.5733 (yellow card)
(Barbados) R. Watson	1:49.3067	KTM X-Bow	(United States) K. Busch	1:46.0155
(United Kingdom) S. Wolff	1:49.0020	Ariel Atom Cup	(Barbados) R. Watson	1:47.8957
(Norway) P. Solberg	1:47.6307	Ariel Atom Cup	(United States) K. Busch	1:45.4474 (yellow card)

=== Group C ===
Pos.	Team	Wins	Losses	Best Time
1	(United States) Robby Gordon	3	0	1:39.5145
2	(France) Esteban Ocon	2	1	1:39.9433
3	(Argentina) José María López	1	2	1:40.1661
4	(Jamaica) Doug Gore	0	3	1:40.1819

Driver 1	Time 1	Car	Driver 2	Time 2
(Argentina) J.M. López	1:45.3275	KTM X-Bow	(France) E. Ocon	1:44.0047
(United States) R. Gordon	1:45.6735	KTM X-Bow	(Jamaica) D. Gore	1:46.6936 (yellow card)
(Jamaica) D. Gore	2:01.7432 (yellow card) (yellow card)	ROC Car	(Argentina) J.M. López	1:47.8188
(France) E. Ocon	1:48.6415	ROC Car	(United States) R. Gordon	1:47.8002
(Jamaica) D. Gore	1:40.1819	Audi R8 LMS	(France) E. Ocon	1:39.9433
(Argentina) J.M. López	1:40.1661	Audi R8 LMS	(United States) R. Gordon	1:39.5145

=== Group D ===
Pos.	Team	Wins	Losses	Best Time
1	(United States) Ryan Hunter-Reay	3	0	1:46.3440
2	(Germany) Pascal Wehrlein	2	1	1:46.8328
3	(Denmark) Tom Kristensen	1	2	1:43.2076
4	(United Kingdom) Jolyon Palmer	0	3	1:47.8287

Driver 1	Time 1	Car	Driver 2	Time 2
(Denmark) T. Kristensen	1:51.4421 (yellow card) (yellow card)	ROC Car	(Germany) P. Wehrlein	1:46.8328 (yellow card)
(United States) R. Hunter-Reay	1:49.2027	ROC Car	(United Kingdom) J. Palmer	1:52.4351 (yellow card) (yellow card)
(United Kingdom) J. Palmer	1:47.8287	Euro Racecar	(Denmark) T. Kristensen	1:43.2076
(Germany) P. Wehrlein	1:48.5408 (yellow card)	Euro Racecar	(United States) R. Hunter-Reay	1:46.3440
(United Kingdom) J. Palmer	DNF	Stadium Super Truck	(Germany) P. Wehrlein	1:59.5519
(Denmark) T. Kristensen	2:00.4934 (yellow card)	Stadium Super Truck	(United States) R. Hunter-Reay	1:57.8711

=== Knockout stage ===
Quarterfinals
(United Kingdom) David Coulthard	1
(Norway) Petter Solberg	0
(United States) Kurt Busch	0
(Australia) Jamie Whincup	1
(United States) Robby Gordon	0
(Germany) Pascal Wehrlein	1
(United States) Ryan Hunter-Reay	0
(France) Esteban Ocon	1

Semifinals
(United Kingdom) David Coulthard	1
(Australia) Jamie Whincup	0
(Germany) Pascal Wehrlein	1
(France) Esteban Ocon	0

Final
(United Kingdom) David Coulthard	2
(Germany) Pascal Wehrlein	0

==== Quarterfinals ====
Driver 1	Time 1	Car	Driver 2	Time 2
(United Kingdom) David Coulthard	1:34.9735	Volkswagen Polo RX	(Norway) Petter Solberg	1:36.1533 (yellow card)
(United States) Kurt Busch	1:42.3332	Audi R8 LMS	(Australia) Jamie Whincup	1:41.6611
(United States) Robby Gordon	1:48.3652	ROC Car	(Germany) Pascal Wehrlein	1:47.1126 (yellow card)
(United States) Ryan Hunter-Reay	1:49.8119	KTM X-Bow	(France) Esteban Ocon	1:44.6065

==== Semifinals ====
Driver 1	Time 1	Car	Driver 2	Time 2
(United Kingdom) David Coulthard	1:39.7538	Audi R8 LMS	(Australia) Jamie Whincup	1:39.9289
(Germany) Pascal Wehrlein	1:48.0097 (yellow card)	ROC Car	(France) Esteban Ocon	1:55.4148 (yellow card)

==== Final ====
Driver 1	Time 1	Car	Driver 2	Time 2
(United Kingdom) David Coulthard	1:42.5122 (yellow card)	KTM X-Bow	(Germany) Pascal Wehrlein	1:43.9608 (yellow card)
(United Kingdom) David Coulthard	1:43.8670	Ariel Atom Cup	(Germany) Pascal Wehrlein	1:46.5734
