= 2012 Race of Champions =

Motor racing competition

Seasons
- ← 2011 2013 →

Layout of the Track

The 2012 Race of Champions was the 25th running of the event, and took place over 14–16 December 2012 at the Rajamangala Stadium in Bangkok, Thailand. During the first day, a ROC Thailand contest was held with four local drivers to decide the identity of the Thai representatives. The top two drivers (Nattavude Charoensukawattana and Tin Sritrai) advanced to the ROC Asia contest, where they faced teams from India, China and Japan. The Thai team was guaranteed a place in the main Nations Cup, whilst the second spot was taken by the victorious Indian team formed by F1 driver Narain Karthikeyan and WEC driver Karun Chandhok. During the second day, Germany took their sixth consecutive Nations Cup victory courtesy of Sebastian Vettel and Michael Schumacher, beating France (Sébastien Ogier and Romain Grosjean) in the final 2–0. During the final day, Romain Grosjean won the Race of Champions, beating Tom Kristensen 2–0 in a closely fought final. In the UK, the live broadcasts of the latter two days of the event on Motors TV attracted a peak of 44,000 television viewers, a respectable figure for a satellite-only channel.

== Participants ==
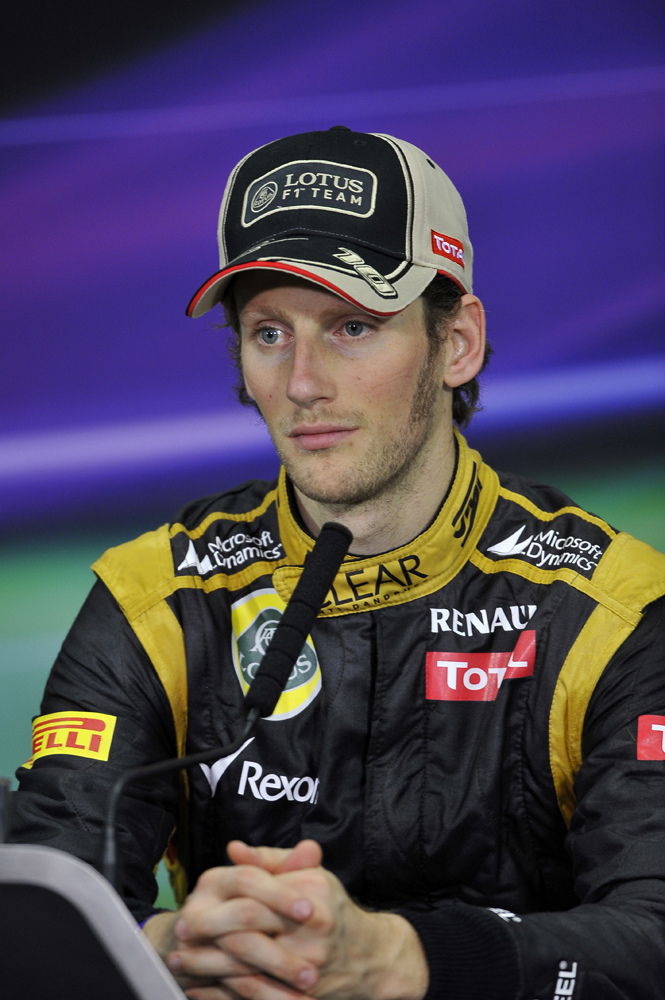
Romain Grosjean, the 2012 Champion of Champions

Champions from numerous series were invited, including Formula One (Sebastian Vettel, Michael Schumacher and Romain Grosjean), MotoGP (Jorge Lorenzo and Mick Doohan), WTCC (Andy Priaulx), V8 Supercars (Jamie Whincup), PWRC (Benito Guerra) and IndyCar (Ryan Hunter-Reay). Also present was eight-time 24 Hours of Le Mans winner Tom Kristensen. The 2012 edition marked the first time drivers from India, Thailand and Mexico have competed, whilst it was the first time since the inaugural Nations Cup event in 1999 that there were no Finnish drivers present. Reigning champion Sébastien Ogier was the only former 'Champion of Champions' in attendance.

Team	Drivers	2012 series
All-Stars	(Denmark) Tom Kristensen	WEC
All-Stars	(Spain) Jorge Lorenzo	MotoGP
Americas	(Mexico) Benito Guerra	Production WRC
Americas	(United States) Ryan Hunter-Reay	IndyCar Series
Australia	Mick Doohan	none
Australia	Jamie Whincup	V8 Supercars
France	Romain Grosjean	Formula One
France	Sébastien Ogier	WRC
Germany	Michael Schumacher	Formula One
Germany	Sebastian Vettel	Formula One
(United Kingdom) Great Britain	David Coulthard	DTM
(United Kingdom) Great Britain	Andy Priaulx	DTM
India	Karun Chandhok	WEC
India	Narain Karthikeyan	Formula One
Thailand	Nattavude Charoensukawattana	Super Car Thailand
Thailand	Tin Sritrai	Super Car Thailand

=== ROC Asia ===
2012 marked the inaugural ROC Asia event, with drivers from a variety of championships (including Formula One, WEC and Super GT) taking part. The top two drivers from ROC Thailand would represent Thailand in the event.

Country	Drivers	2012 series
China	Han Han	China Rally and CTCC
China	Ho-Pin Tung	PCC Asia
India	Karun Chandhok	WEC
India	Narain Karthikeyan	Formula One
Japan	Takuto Iguchi	Super GT
Japan	Kazuya Oshima	Formula Nippon/Super GT
Thailand	Nattavude Charoensukawattana	Super Car Thailand
Thailand	Tin Sritrai	Super Car Thailand

=== ROC Thailand ===
The ROC Thailand contest was held to decide who would represent Thailand in ROC Asia, the Nations Cup and the Race of Champions. 2001 Asian Touring Car Series champion Charoensukawattana and 1999 Formula Asia champion Horthongkum battled out with drift driver Nana and touring car driver Sritrai to be among the top 2.

Country	Drivers	2012 series
Thailand	Nattavude Charoensukawattana	Super Car Thailand
Thailand	Nattapong Horthongkum	Super Car Thailand
Thailand	Sak Nana	
Thailand	Tin Sritrai	Super Car Thailand

== Cars ==
Seven cars were used throughout the event. The Toyota GT86 and Lamborghini Gallardo Super Trofeo made their debut in this year, while the Škoda Fabia was dropped.

- Audi R8 LMS
- KTM X-Bow
- Lamborghini Gallardo Super Trofeo
- Euro Racecar
- ROC Car
- Toyota GT86
- Volkswagen Scirocco

== The track ==
A 697 metres tarmac track was constructed in the Rajamangala Stadium. The track had a bridge to connect the outer lane with the inner lane in an 8 shape track. All the races were run to 2 laps (1.394 km). In the first day a chicane was placed in the bridge area. The chicane was modified for the second and third day making the lap time longer.

Tom Kristensen made the fastest time (1:14.0680) on the second configuration in an Audi R8 at speed of 67.75 km/h.

== ROC Thailand ==
=== Round Robin ===
Pos.	Driver	Wins	Losses	Best Time
1	(Thailand) Nattavude Charoensukawattana	3	0	1:21.087
2	(Thailand) Tin Sritrai	2	1	1:22.287
3	(Thailand) Nattapong Horthongkum	1	2	1:22.877
4	(Thailand) Sak Nana	0	3	1:24.309

=== Final ===
Winner	Time	Car	Loser	Time
(Thailand) Nattavude Charoensukawattana	1:21.9160	Toyota GT86	(Thailand) Tin Sritrai	1:22.8871

== ROC Asia ==
=== Round Robin ===
Pos.	Team	Wins	Losses	Drivers	Wins	Losses	Best Time
1	India	4	2	Karun Chandhok	2	1	1:19.393
1	India	4	2	Narain Karthikeyan	2	1	1:19.460
2	Japan	3	3	Kazuya Oshima	2	1	1:18.470
2	Japan	3	3	Takuto Iguchi	1	2	1:19.853
3	Thailand	3	3	Nattavude Charoensukawattana	2	1	1:21.110
3	Thailand	3	3	Tin Sritrai	1	2	1:20.3364
4	China	2	4	Han Han	2	1	1:19.450
4	China	2	4	Ho-Pin Tung	0	3	1:18.2100

=== Final ===
Winner	Time	Car	Loser	Time
(India) Narain Karthikeyan	1:20.1777	Volkswagen Scirocco	(Japan) Kazuya Oshima	1:20.6809
(India) Karun Chandhok	1:21.4805	Toyota GT86	(Japan) Takuto Iguchi	1:22.4326

== Nations Cup ==
Drivers who made a false start are marked with a Yellow card (yellow card) in the tables, and a time penalty of 5 seconds was added to their original time.

=== Group A ===
Pos.	Team	Wins	Losses	Driver	Wins	Losses	Best Time
1	France	4	2	Romain Grosjean	2	1	1:16.613
1	France	4	2	Sébastien Ogier	2	1	1:16.240
2	All-Stars	3	3	(Denmark) Tom Kristensen	2	1	1:14.708
2	All-Stars	3	3	(Spain) Jorge Lorenzo	1	2	1:23.310
3	Americas	3	3	(Mexico) Benito Guerra	2	1	1:22.346
3	Americas	3	3	(United States) Ryan Hunter-Reay	1	2	1:19.133
4	(United Kingdom) Great Britain	2	4	David Coulthard	1	2	1:15.798
4	(United Kingdom) Great Britain	2	4	Andy Priaulx	1	2	1:17.055

Team 1	Time 1	Score	Team 2	Time 2
France		1–1	(United Kingdom) Great Britain	
R. Grosjean	1:23.6650	Volkswagen Scirocco	D. Coulthard	1:23.6169
S. Ogier	1:16.2420	Audi R8 LMS	A. Priaulx	1:17.0557
(Mexico) (United States) Americas		1–1	(Denmark) (Spain) All-Stars	
R. Hunter-Reay	1:24.5635	Volkswagen Scirocco	T. Kristensen	1:23.0759
B. Guerra	1:22.3469	Audi R8 LMS	J. Lorenzo	DNF
France		2–0	(Denmark) (Spain) All-Stars	
R. Grosjean	1:16.6132	KTM X-Bow	T. Kristensen	1:16.7225 (yellow card)
S. Ogier	1:24.5176	Toyota GT86	J. Lorenzo	1:26.7994

Team 1	Time 1	Score	Team 2	Time 2
(United Kingdom) Great Britain		1–1	(Mexico) (United States) Americas	
D. Coulthard	1:16.2360 (yellow card)	KTM X-Bow	R. Hunter-Reay	1:19.1336
A. Priaulx	1:24.4475	Toyota GT86	B. Guerra	1:24.0601 (yellow card)
(Denmark) (Spain) All-Stars		2–0	(United Kingdom) Great Britain	
T. Kristensen	1:14.7081	Audi R8 LMS	D. Coulthard	1:15.7987
J. Lorenzo	1:23.3108	Volkswagen Scirocco	A. Priaulx	1:23.1226 (yellow card)
(Mexico) (United States) Americas		1–1	France	
R. Hunter-Reay	1:18.5096 (yellow card)	Audi R8 LMS	Romain Grosjean	1:16.5117
B. Guerra	1:22.7852	Volkswagen Scirocco	Sébastien Ogier	1:23.6944

=== Group B ===
Pos.	Team	Wins	Losses	Driver	Wins	Losses	Best Time
1	Germany	6	0	Michael Schumacher	3	0	1:15.614
1	Germany	6	0	Sebastian Vettel	3	0	1:16.657
2	Australia	3	3	Mick Doohan	1	2	1:20.178
2	Australia	3	3	Jamie Whincup	2	1	1:19.385
3	India	2	4	Karun Chandhok	1	2	1:18.317
3	India	2	4	Narain Karthikeyan	1	2	1:23.169
4	Thailand	1	5	Nattavude Charoensukawattana	0	3	1:23.964
4	Thailand	1	5	Tin Sritrai	1	2	1:19.160

Team 1	Time 1	Score	Team 2	Time 2
Germany		2–0	Thailand	
M. Schumacher	1:15.6141	KTM X-Bow	N. Charoensukawattana	1:18.9635 (yellow card)
S. Vettel	1:19.8275	ROC car	T. Sritrai	1:24.4221 (yellow card)
Australia		2–0	India	
J. Whincup	1:19.3849	KTM X-Bow	N. Karthikeyan	1:18.1692 (yellow card)
M. Doohan	1:20.9261	ROC car	K. Chandhok	1:21.2589
India		0–2	Germany	
N. Karthikeyan	1:25.8278 (yellow card)	ROC Car	M. Schumacher	1:19.1891
K. Chandhok	1:18.3171	KTM X-Bow	S. Vettel	1:16.6574

Team 1	Time 1	Score	Team 2	Time 2
Thailand		1–1	Australia	
N. Charoensukawattana	1:22.5612 (yellow card)	ROC Car	J. Whincup	1:22.0806
T. Sritrai	1:19.1595	KTM X-Bow	M. Doohan	1:20.1776
Thailand		1–1	India	
N. Charoensukawattana	1:22.7724 (yellow card)	Euro Racecar	N. Karthikeyan	1:23.4550
T. Sritrai	1:21.2564	L. Gallardo ST	K. Chandhok	1:19.6611
Australia		0–2	Germany	
J. Whincup	1:20.9684	Euro Racecar	M. Schumacher	1:18.3839 (yellow card)
M. Doohan	DNF (red card)	L. Gallardo ST	S. Vettel	1:19.1646

=== Finals ===
Semi-finals
France	2
(Denmark) (Spain) All-Stars	0
Germany	2
Australia	0

Final
France	0
Germany	2

==== Semifinals ====
Team 1	Time 1	Car	Team 2	Time 2
France		2-0	(Denmark) (Spain) All-Stars	
Sébastien Ogier	1:15.5143	Audi R8 LMS	Tom Kristensen	1:15.6365
Romain Grosjean	1:23.1327	Toyota GT86	Jorge Lorenzo	1:24.7146
Germany		2-0	Australia	
Michael Schumacher	1:17.2869	Euro Racecar	Jamie Whincup	1:22.1543 (yellow card)
Sebastian Vettel	1:17.6834 (yellow card)	Lamborghini Gallardo Super Trofeo	Mick Doohan	1:19.6904

==== Final ====
Team 1	Time 1	Car	Team 2	Time 2
France		0-2	Germany	
Romain Grosjean	1:17.3946	KTM X-Bow	Michael Schumacher	1:15.3257
Sébastien Ogier	1:20.5839	ROC Car	Sebastian Vettel	1:18.6005

== Race of Champions ==
- Ho-Pin Tung and Kazuya Oshima qualified having achieved the best times (among non-Thai drivers) in ROC Asia.

=== Group A ===
Pos.	Team	Wins	Losses	Best Time
1	(France) Sébastien Ogier	3	0	1:17.6136
2	(United Kingdom) David Coulthard	2	1	1:16.1106
3	(Australia) Jamie Whincup	1	2	1:17.6635
4	(Mexico) Benito Guerra	0	3	1:16.8181

Driver 1	Time 1	Car	Driver 2	Time 2
(France) S. Ogier	1:17.6136	Audi R8 LMS	(Mexico) Benito Guerra	1:18.4051
(Australia) J. Whincup	1:17.6635	Audi R8 LMS	(United Kingdom) D. Coulthard	1:16.8300
(United Kingdom) D. Coulthard	1:23.4184	VW Scirocco	(France) S. Ogier	1:21.9990
(Mexico) B. Guerra	1:30.3107 (yellow card)	Toyota GT86	(Australia) J. Whincup	1:22.6688
(United Kingdom) D. Coulthard	1:16.1106	KTM X-Bow	(Mexico) B. Guerra	1:16.8181
(France) S. Ogier	1:17.9073	KTM X-Bow	(Australia) J. Whincup	1:20.7565 (yellow card)

=== Group B ===
Pos.	Team	Wins	Losses	Best Time
1	(China) Ho-Pin Tung	2	1	1:16.1518
2	(Denmark) Tom Kristensen	2	1	1:17.3359
3	(Thailand) Nattavude Charoensukawattana	1	2	1:16.7000
4	(United Kingdom) Andy Priaulx	1	2	1:17.1192

Driver 1	Time 1	Car	Driver 2	Time 2
(Denmark) T. Kristensen	1:22.5816	VW Scirocco	(Thailand) N. Charoensukawattana	1:23.0965
(United Kingdom) A. Priaulx	1:22.9224	VW Scirocco	(China) H.P. Tung	1:24.7555
(China) H.P. Tung	1:16.1518	Audi R8 LMS	(Denmark) T. Kristensen	1:16.2422
(Thailand) N. Charoensukawattana	1:16.7000	Audi R8 LMS	(United Kingdom) A. Priaulx	1:17.1192
(China) H.P. Tung	1:17.9684	L. Gallardo ST	(Thailand) N. Charoensukawattana	1:24.6836 (yellow card)
(Denmark) T. Kristensen	1:17.3359	L. Gallardo ST	(United Kingdom) A. Priaulx	DNF (red card)

=== Group C ===
Pos.	Team	Wins	Losses	Best Time
1	(Germany) Sebastian Vettel	3	0	1:15.4949
2	(Australia) Mick Doohan	2	1	1:18.1864
3	(Thailand) Tin Sritrai	1	2	1:18.0430
4	(Spain) Jorge Lorenzo	0	3	1:19.0598

Driver 1	Time 1	Car	Driver 2	Time 2
(Germany) S. Vettel	1:21.3306	ROC Car	(Thailand) T. Sritrai	1:22.3280
(Spain) J. Lorenzo	1:22.7320	ROC Car	(Australia) M. Doohan	1:22.2028
(Australia) M. Doohan	1:19.1871	KTM X-Bow	(Germany) S. Vettel	1:16.4088
(Thailand) T. Sritrai	1:18.0430	KTM X-Bow	(Spain) J. Lorenzo	1:20.4889
(Australia) M. Doohan	1:18.1864	KTM X-Bow	(Thailand) T. Sritrai	1:23.1294 (yellow card)
(Germany) S. Vettel	1:15.4949	KTM X-Bow	(Spain) J. Lorenzo	1:19.0598

=== Group D ===
Pos.	Team	Wins	Losses	Best Time
1	(Germany) Michael Schumacher	3	0	1:15.5993
2	(France) Romain Grosjean	2	1	1:15.7666
3	(United States) Ryan Hunter-Reay	1	2	1:17.0206
4	(Japan) Kazuya Oshima	0	3	1:21.7940

Driver 1	Time 1	Car	Driver 2	Time 2
(Germany) M. Schumacher	1:15.5993	KTM X-Bow	(France) R. Grosjean	1:15.7666
(United States) R. Hunter-Reay	1:17.0206	KTM X-Bow	(Japan) K. Oshima	1:22.5314 (yellow card)
(Japan) K. Oshima	1:21.7940	ROC Car	(Germany) M. Schumacher	1:19.7627
(France) R. Grosjean	1:19.3890	ROC Car	(United States) R. Hunter-Reay	1:26.2154 (yellow card)
(Japan) K. Oshima	1:24.7413 (yellow card)	Euro Racecar	(France) R. Grosjean	1:20.9656
(Germany) M. Schumacher	1:17.8680	Euro Racecar	(United States) R. Hunter-Reay	1:25.2427 (yellow card)

=== Knockout stage ===
Quarterfinals
(France) Sébastien Ogier	0
(Denmark) Tom Kristensen	1
(China) Ho-Pin Tung	0
(United Kingdom) David Coulthard	1
(Germany) Sebastian Vettel	0
(France) Romain Grosjean	1
(Germany) Michael Schumacher	1
(Australia) Mick Doohan	0

Semifinals
(Denmark) Tom Kristensen	1
(United Kingdom) David Coulthard	0
(France) Romain Grosjean	1
(Germany) Michael Schumacher	0

Final
(Denmark) Tom Kristensen	0
(France) Romain Grosjean	2

==== Quarterfinals ====
Driver 1	Time 1	Car	Driver 2	Time 2
(France) Sébastien Ogier	1:14.5605	Audi R8 LMS	(Denmark) Tom Kristensen	1:14.0680
(China) Ho-Pin Tung	1:21.7089	Volkswagen Scirocco	(United Kingdom) David Coulthard	1:21.6364
(Germany) Sebastian Vettel	DNF (yellow card)	KTM X-Bow	(France) Romain Grosjean	1:15.5455
(Germany) Michael Schumacher	1:17.0426	Euro Racecar	(Australia) Mick Doohan	1:25.1853 (yellow card)

==== Semifinals ====
Driver 1	Time 1	Car	Driver 2	Time 2
(Denmark) Tom Kristensen	1:14.3384	Audi R8 LMS	(United Kingdom) David Coulthard	1:15.8312
(France) Romain Grosjean	1:14.8951	KTM X-Bow	(Germany) Michael Schumacher	1:15.3823

==== Final ====
Driver 1	Time 1	Car	Driver 2	Time 2
(Denmark) Tom Kristensen	1:18.9348	ROC Car	(France) Romain Grosjean	1:18.4775
(France) Romain Grosjean	1:16.0779	KTM X-Bow	(Denmark) Tom Kristensen	1:16.4569
