= 2015 Race of Champions =

Motor racing competition

Seasons
- ← 2014 2017 →

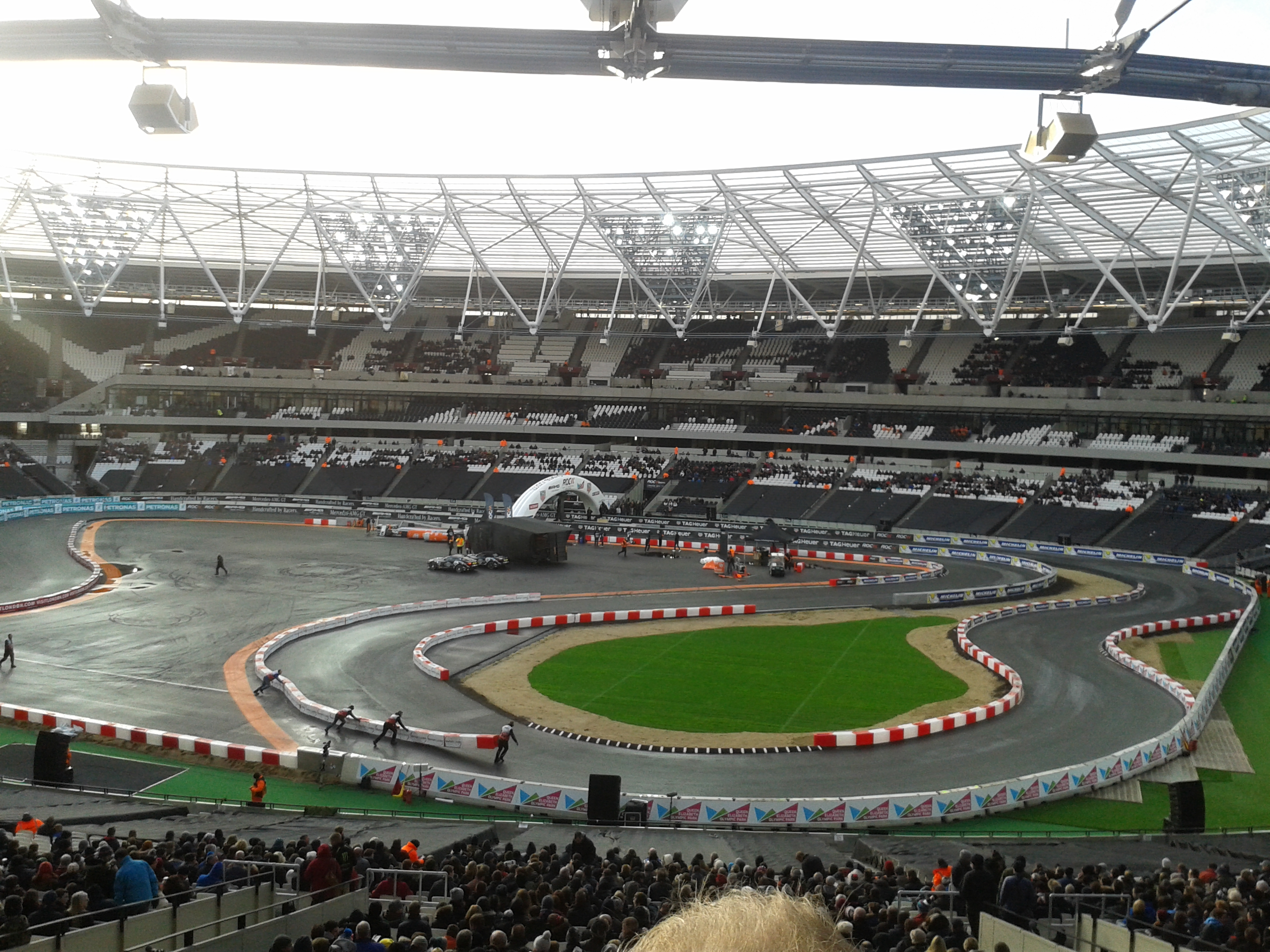
The Race of Champions circuit inside London's Olympic Stadium

The 2015 Race of Champions was a motorsports event that took place over 20–21 November 2015 at the Olympic Stadium in London.

A previous six-time winner of the Nations' Cup, Sebastian Vettel became Champion of Champions for the first time, defeating Tom Kristensen, who made the final for the fourth time, 2–0. In the Nations' Cup itself, the England 1 team of Jason Plato and Andy Priaulx took the victory in a final race decider against Germany, who were represented by Vettel and fellow Formula One driver Nico Hülkenberg.

== Participants ==
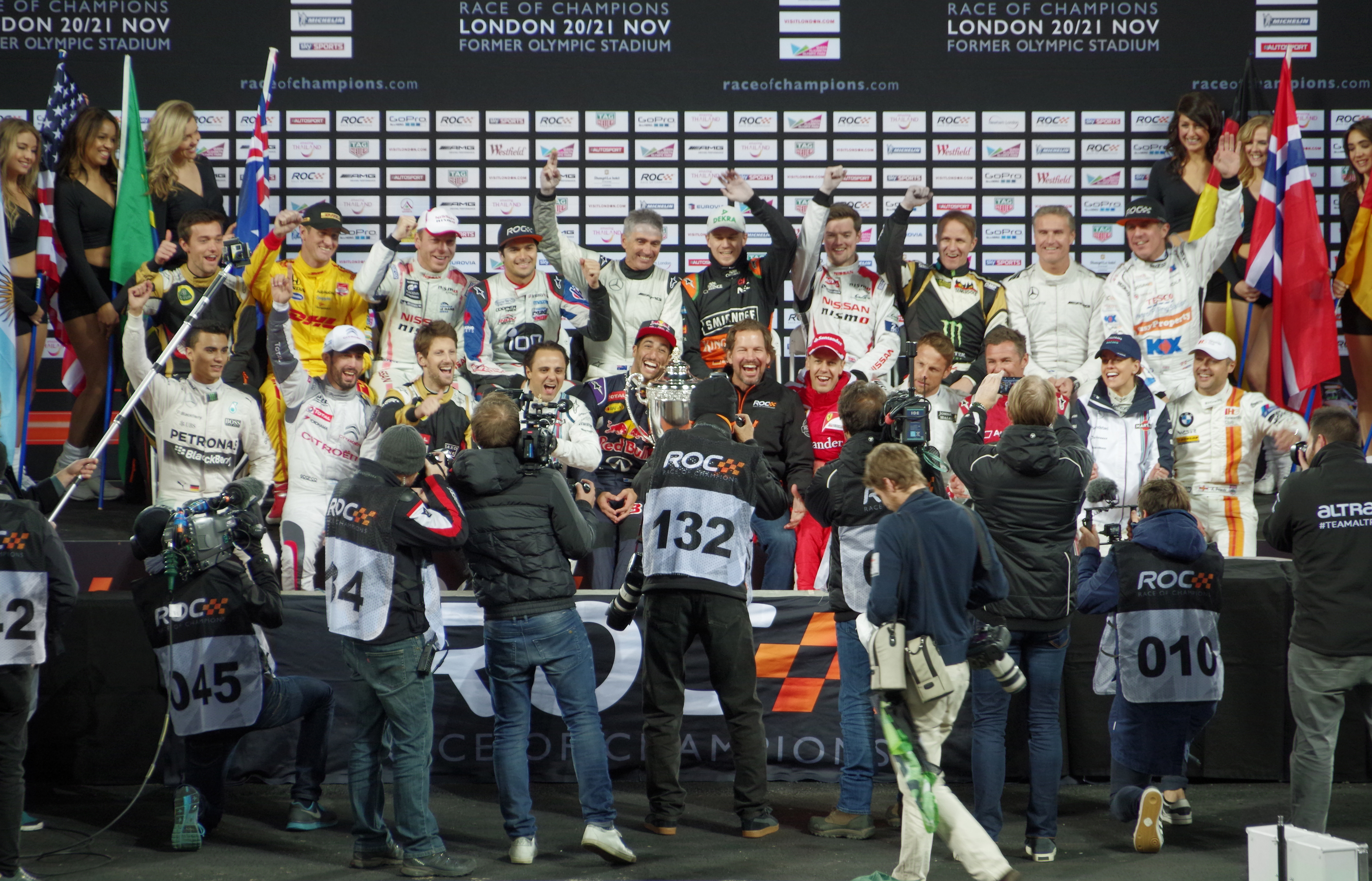
The 2015 Race of Champions drivers

Nations' Cup team	Drivers	2015 series
All Stars	(France) Romain Grosjean	Formula One
All Stars	(Scotland) Chris Hoy	ELMS, Radical European Masters
Americas	(United States) Ryan Hunter-Reay	IndyCar
Americas	(Argentina) José María López	World Touring Car Championship
Australia	Daniel Ricciardo	Formula One
Australia	Mick Doohan	none
Brazil	Felipe Massa	Formula One
Brazil	Nelson Piquet Jr.	Global RallyCross, Formula E, Indy Lights
England 1	Jason Plato	BTCC
England 1	(Guernsey) Andy Priaulx	BTCC, ELMS
England 2	Jenson Button	Formula One
England 2	Alex Buncombe	Blancpain Endurance Series
Germany	Sebastian Vettel	Formula One
Germany	Nico Hülkenberg	Formula One, WEC
Nordic	(Denmark) Tom Kristensen	none
Nordic	(Norway) Petter Solberg	World Rallycross Championship
Scotland	David Coulthard	none
Scotland	Susie Wolff	Formula One test and reserve driver
Young Stars	(England) Jolyon Palmer	Formula One test and reserve driver
Young Stars	(Germany) Pascal Wehrlein	Deutsche Tourenwagen Masters

== Cars ==
Eight vehicles were used throughout the event. Returning from the 2014 Race of Champions were the Ariel Atom Cup, the KTM X-Bow, the ROC Car and the NASCAR Chevrolet SS Stock Car as used in the NASCAR Whelen Euro Series. Introduced for 2015 were the Mercedes-AMG GT, the Radical SR3 RSX and the Rage Comet, while the RX 150 returned after an absence of several years.

== Nations' Cup ==
=== Preliminary round ===
Team 1	Score	Team 2
Brazil	0–2	England 1
All Stars	1–2	Young Stars

=== Bracket ===
Quarter-finals
Americas	1
Nordic	2
Germany	2
Australia	0
Scotland	0
England 2	2
England 1	2
Young Stars	1

Semi-final
Nordic	0
Germany	2
England 2	1
England 1	2

Final
Germany	1
England 1	2

== Race of Champions ==
=== Preliminary round ===
The preliminary round pairs were:

- (United States) Ryan Hunter-Reay def. (Argentina) José María López
- (United Kingdom) Andy Priaulx def. (Germany) Pascal Wehrlein
- (United Kingdom) Bradley Philpot def. (Australia) Mick Doohan
- (United Kingdom) Alex Buncombe def. (United Kingdom) Jolyon Palmer

=== Knockout stage ===
Round 1
A1	(Norway) Petter Solberg	0
A4	(Germany) Sebastian Vettel	2
A2	(Germany) Nico Hülkenberg	2
A3	(Australia) Daniel Ricciardo	0
B1	(United Kingdom) Jenson Button	0
B4	(Brazil) Felipe Massa	2
B2	(United Kingdom) David Coulthard	2
B3	(United Kingdom) Susie Wolff	0
C1	(Brazil) Nelson Piquet Jr.	0
C4	(Denmark) Tom Kristensen	2
C2	(United Kingdom) Jason Plato	2
C3	(France) Romain Grosjean	0
D1	(United Kingdom) Andy Priaulx	2
D4	(United States) Ryan Hunter-Reay	0
D2	(United Kingdom) Bradley Philpot	0
D3	(United Kingdom) Alex Buncombe	2

Quarter-finals
(Germany) Sebastian Vettel	2
(Germany) Nico Hülkenberg	0
(Brazil) Felipe Massa	0
(United Kingdom) David Coulthard	2
(Denmark) Tom Kristensen	2
(United Kingdom) Jason Plato	0
(United Kingdom) Andy Priaulx	1
(United Kingdom) Alex Buncombe	2

Semi-final
(Germany) Sebastian Vettel	2
(United Kingdom) David Coulthard	1
(Denmark) Tom Kristensen	2
(United Kingdom) Alex Buncombe	0

Final
(Germany) Sebastian Vettel	2
(Denmark) Tom Kristensen	0
