= Susie Wolff =

Scottish racing driver (born 1982)

Susie Wolff MBE
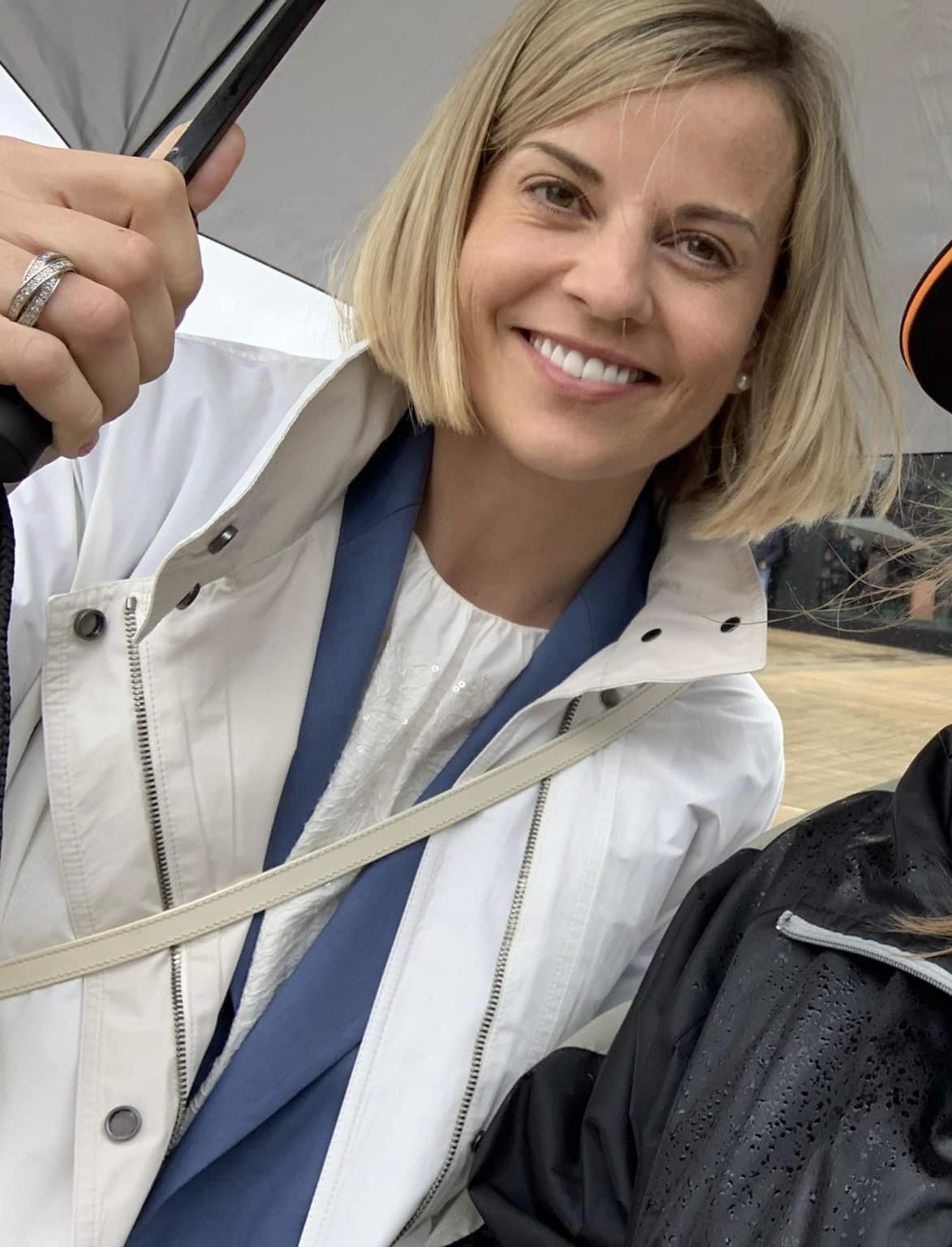
- Wolff in 2022
- Born: Suzanne Stoddart; 6 December 1982 (age 43); Oban, Scotland
- Education: Oban High School; University of Edinburgh
- Spouse: Toto Wolff (m. 2011)
- Children: 1

DTM career
- Years active: 2006–2012
- Teams: Mücke Motorsport, Persson Motorsport
- Car number: 24
- Starts: 73
- Wins: 0
- Poles: 0
- Fastest laps: 0
- Best finish: 13th in 2010

Previous series
- 2005 2002–04: British F3; Formula Renault UK

Suzanne Wolff (née Stoddart; born 6 December 1982) is a Scottish former professional racing driver and current managing director of F1 Academy.

Wolff started in karting, before graduating to Formula Renault and Formula Three, then moving to the Deutsche Tourenwagen Masters (DTM) to compete for Mercedes-Benz. In 2012, she was signed by Williams in Formula One to work as a development driver. At the 2014 British Grand Prix at Silverstone, she became the first woman to take part in a Formula One race weekend in 22 years, by participating in practice. On 4 November 2015, Wolff announced her retirement from motorsport, last competing at the Race of Champions held at the end of November. In 2016, Wolff joined Channel 4 in the UK to be an analyst for their Formula One coverage.

In 2018, Wolff joined Venturi Racing in Formula E as Team Principal. In 2021, she was promoted to the role of CEO. In August 2022 following the Season 8 finale in South Korea, she announced her departure from Venturi and Formula E.

== Biography ==
=== Early life ===
Wolff was born in Oban on 6 December, 1982. Her parents, John and Sally Stoddart, owned a motorcycle dealership in Oban until 2025. John, her father, raced bikes competitively. Susie's parents met when her mother bought her first motorbike from her father's shop. Wolff has an older brother, David, 15 months her senior. As toddlers, Wolff and her brother were put on skis and bikes by her parents, with the open spaces around Oban suited to biking and go-karting.

Wolff realised the potential path of a racing driver when taken to watch her first Formula 3 race at 13. Wolff studied international business at University of Edinburgh, but left after a year. In 2005, Wolff broke her ankle while running, which, along with financial issues, prevented her from competing in Formula Three.

Wolff began competing at karting at the early age of eight, and in 1996 she was named the British Woman Kart Racing Driver of the year. In 1997, she competed in a number of different karting categories and succeeded in most. She was first in the 24hr Middle East Kart Championship, champion in both the Scottish Junior Intercontinental "A" and the Scottish Open Junior Intercontinental "A" categories and was again named British Woman Kart Racing Driver of the year.

In 1998, Wolff moved up to the British Junior Intercontinental "A" Championship and was placed 10th overall in her first season in the class. She also competed in the Federation Cup European Intercontinental "A" Championship and placed 11th overall. For the third consecutive season, she was named British Woman Kart Racing Driver of the year.

The following year, Wolff competed in the British Formula "A" Championship and was placed 13th, also achieving 34th overall in the Formula "A" World Championships to receive the accolade of British Woman Kart Racing Driver of the year for a fourth time.

In 2000, Wolff improved on her previous performances to take 10th in British Formula “A” and 15th in the Formula “A” World Championships, later winning an award which named her as the Top Female Kart Driver in the world.

=== Formula Renault (2001–04) ===
In 2001, Wolff graduated from kart racing to single-seater racing, gaining her first experience in the Formula Renault Winter Series, in which she competed for the Motaworld Racing team. The following year, she made her debut in the full Formula Renault UK Championship for DFR Racing while again representing Motaworld in the Formula Renault Winter Series.

In the 2003 season, Wolff finished ninth overall in the Formula Renault UK Championship and secured her maiden podium finish, achieving recognition for her efforts as one of the finalists in the prestigious BRDC McLaren Autosport Young Driver of the Year Award. Wolff was also selected as the BRDC Rising Star of the Year.

For her third season in the Formula Renault UK Championship in 2004, Wolff raced for Comtec Racing and finished fifth overall in the final standings, taking three podium finishes and points in 19 of the season’s 20 races.

=== Formula Three (2005) ===
In 2005, Wolff advanced to the British Formula 3 Championship to compete for Alan Docking Racing in the Championship Class. Her season was disrupted by an ankle injury sustained during the winter. Wolff also made a one-off appearance in the Porsche Carrera Cup GB at Brands Hatch in June.

=== DTM (2006–12) ===
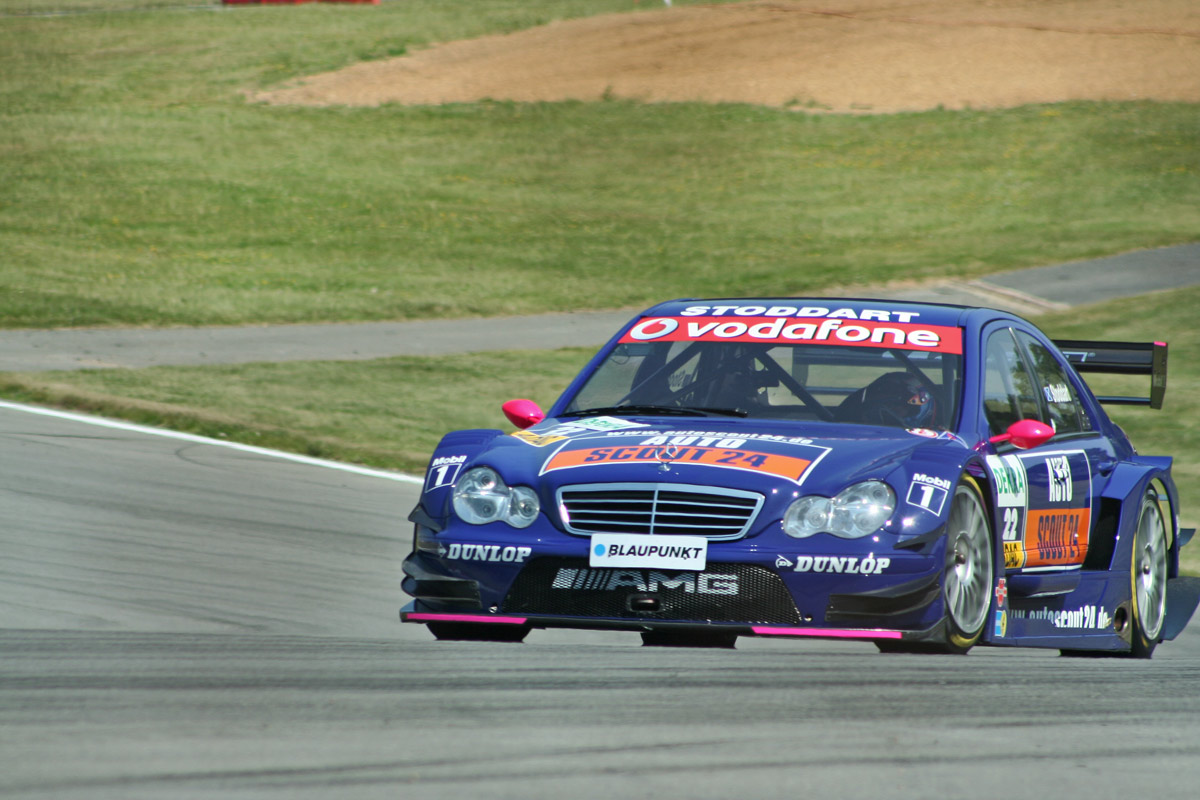
Wolff driving for Mercedes-Benz (Mücke Motorsport) in the 2006 Deutsche Tourenwagen Masters season

In 2006, Wolff began to compete in the DTM. Racing for Mücke Motorsport, she drove a 2004-spec Mercedes-Benz C-Class Coupe and achieved a best finish of ninth overall in the final round at the Hockenheimring to complete her debut season.

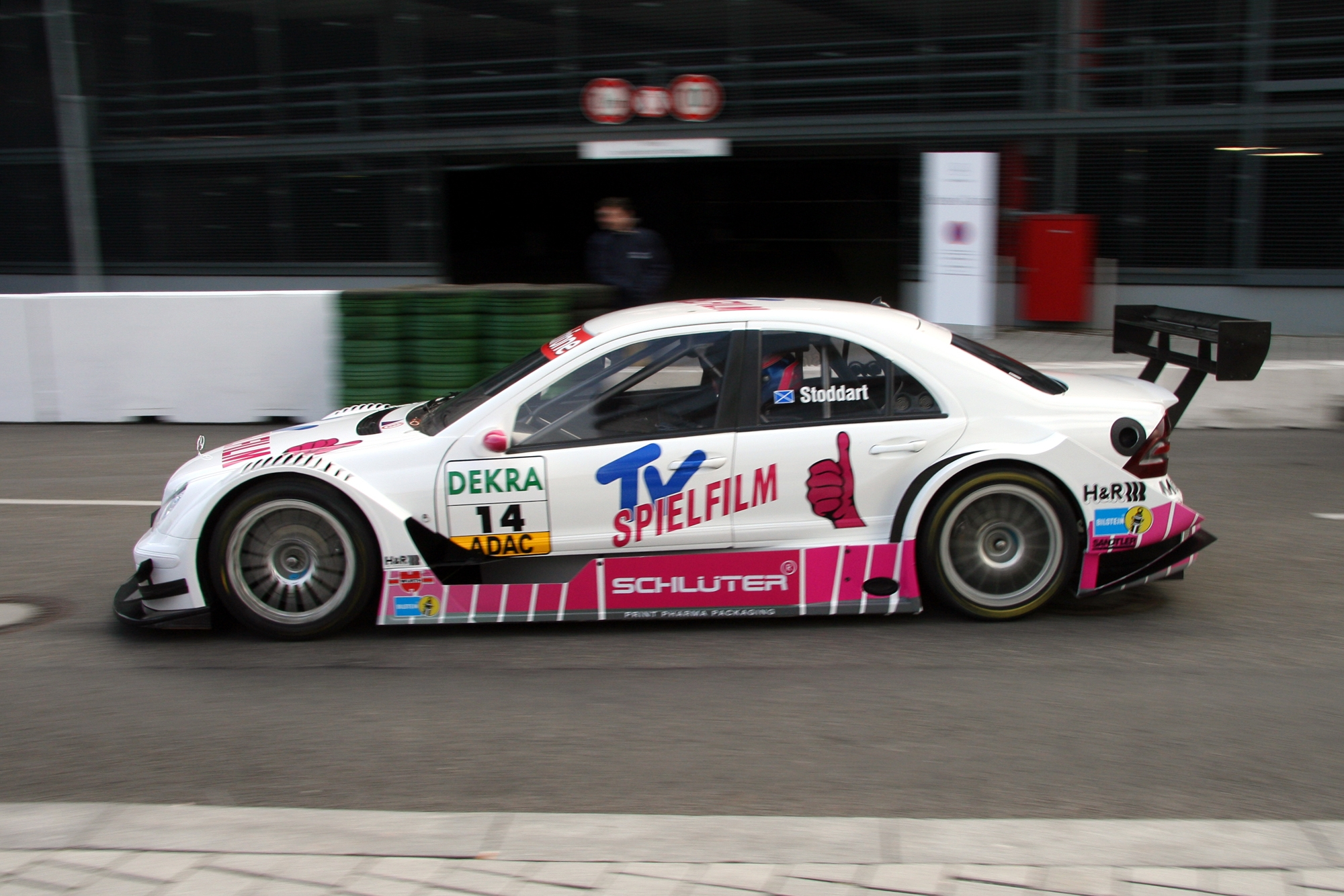
Wolff in 2007

Remaining in the DTM for 2007, again driving for Mücke Motorsport, Wolff recorded her best result at Mugello in Italy, where she finished in 10th place. At the end of the season, she left Mücke Motorsport to join Persson Motorsport for the 2008 season.

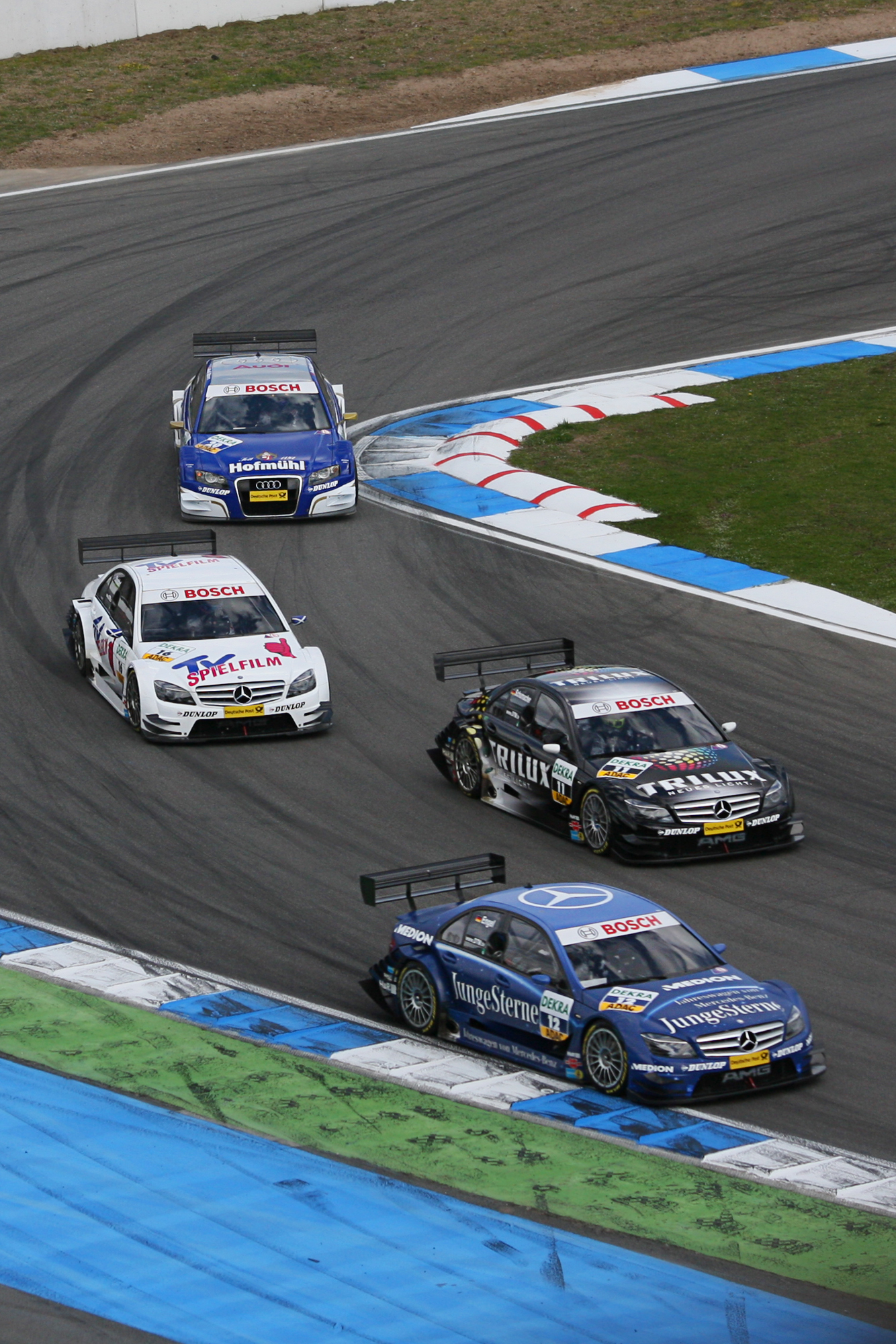
Wolff (white) battling with Maro Engel, Ralf Schumacher and Katherine Legge at Hockenheim in 2008

Moving up to a 2007-specification car, Wolff recorded her best performance of 2008 in June’s race at the Norisring in which she finished 10th – a result she equalled in 2009 on two occasions again at the Norisring and Oschersleben.

2010 showcased Wolff’s best season in the DTM and her third with Persson Motorsport. Taking a seventh-placed finish at Lausitz, she again matched this performance at the Hockenheimring to conclude the season with four points and 13th in the Drivers’ Championship.

Wolff continued to race in the DTM for a further two years with Persson Motorsport and announced her departure from the series ahead of the 2012 finale at the Hockenheimring, ending her seven-season tenure to focus solely on her testing duties with Williams in Formula One.

=== Formula One ===
==== Williams (2012–15) ====
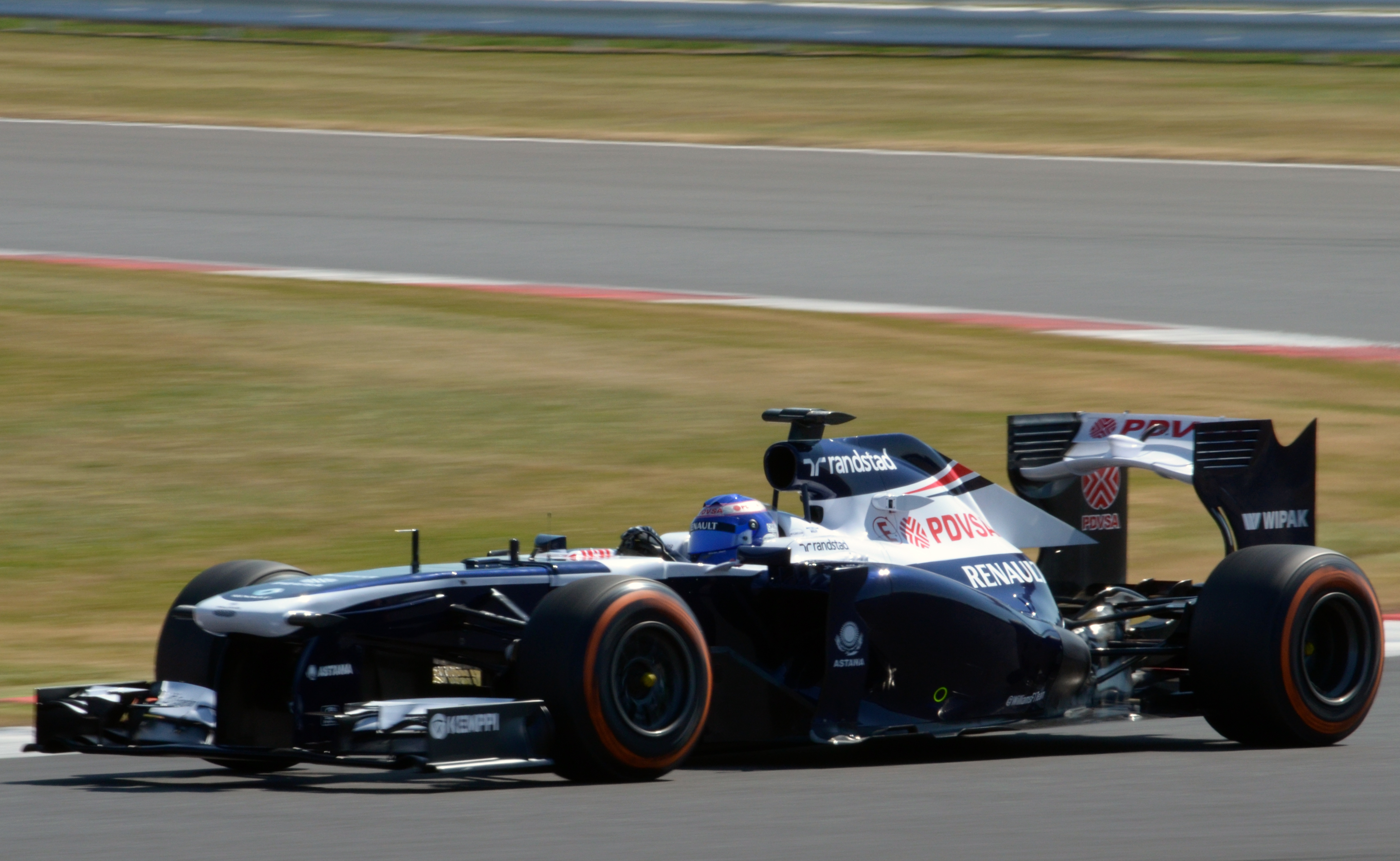
Wolff driving the Williams-Renault at the Young Drivers' Test at Silverstone on 19 July 2013. She posted the ninth-quickest time of the day, 1m35.093s, after completing 89 laps

On 11 April 2012, Wolff was named as a development driver for the Williams Formula One team.

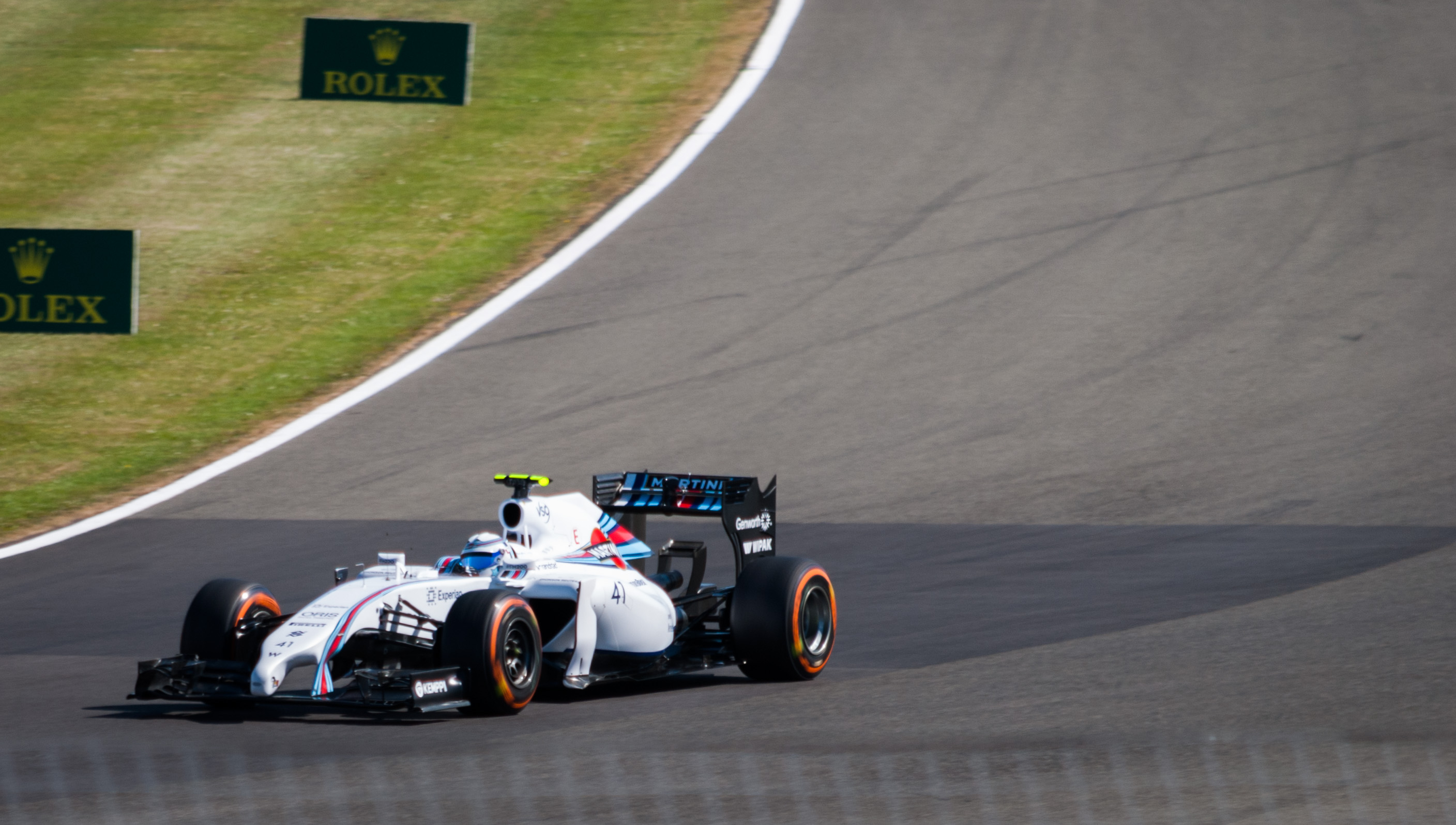
Wolff testing the Williams FW36 at Silverstone during free practice

In 2014, Williams announced that Wolff would be driving in two free practice sessions at the British and German Grand Prix. At the British Grand Prix at Silverstone, Wolff became the first woman to participate in a Formula One weekend since 1992, when Giovanna Amati made three unsuccessful Grand Prix qualification attempts.

Wolff’s time on the track was cut short after an engine problem occurred after completing just one timed lap. On 18 July 2014, Wolff drove in a free practice session at the German Grand Prix which also started with car problems. These issues were solved, and Wolff put in a good performance, finishing the session in 15th place out of 22 cars with a time of 1:20.769, just two-tenths of a second behind team-mate Felipe Massa’s 11th-placed 1:20.542 time.

On 28 November 2014, Williams announced that Wolff would stay with the team for the 2015 season in an enhanced role as test driver, with her position expanded to include two Friday practice runs and two test outings. After driving in Formula One pre-season testing, Wolff clocked a 1:29.708 lap in the first practice session of the Spanish Grand Prix and returned to the cockpit in practice for the British Grand Prix, placing 13th out of 20 cars with a time of 1:37.242.

On 4 November 2015, Wolff announced on the BBC that she was retiring from Formula One, stating that she felt that she had gone as far as she could go, but expressed intentions to help other women in motorsport. Wolff stated that she would compete for one final time in the 2015 Race of Champions at the end of November, representing Scotland alongside former Formula One driver David Coulthard, before subsequently retiring from all forms of motorsport.

==== Mercedes (2016–) ====
Wolff joined Mercedes as one of their ambassadors in 2016, and as part of the role was one of the first to test the Mercedes-AMG One.

=== Formula E (2018–2022) ===
In 2018, Wolff joined Venturi Racing in Formula E as Team Principal and also became a shareholder in the team.

For the 2019–20 season, Venturi entered into a powertrain partnership with Mercedes-EQ.

Under Wolff’s management, the Monegasque outfit experienced its most successful campaign to date in the 2020–21 season, recording 146 points with Edoardo Mortara securing second in the Drivers' World Championship, falling only seven points adrift of winner Nyck de Vries.

In November 2021, Wolff was promoted to the role of CEO, with Jérôme d'Ambrosio becoming Team Principal for the 2021–22 season. In August 2022, she announced that she would leave Venturi in light of the team's plans to rebrand as Maserati MSG Racing from the 2022–23 season.

=== F1 Academy (2023–) ===
On 1 March 2023, Wolff was appointed managing director of the newly launched all-female racing series, F1 Academy.

In December 2023, the FIA launched an investigation into Susie Wolff after receiving an anonymous claim that she leaked F1 confidential information to her husband, but shelved after 48 hours. Most of the F1 teams denied filing complaints about the Wolffs after the FIA announcement. Wolff criticised the conduct of the FIA and its staff, saying that the investigation "shredded her professional reputation overnight". Wolff filed a defamation suit against the FIA in March 2024.

=== Race of Champions ===
The Race of Champions planned to feature a female driver for the first time in its history when Wolff signed up for ROC 2013, to be held at Bangkok's Rajamangala Stadium on 14–15 December. The news was warmly welcomed by ROC co-founder Michèle Mouton, the world's most successful female rally driver. However, in early December 2013, the event was cancelled due to the political situation in Bangkok.

In the 2014 event in Barbados, the Wolff–Coulthard pair was able to compete as Team United Kingdom. The pair reached the finals of the Nations' Cup but lost to Team Nordic. Wolff lost to Tom Kristensen in the Audi R8 LMS Ultra while Coulthard won against Petter Solberg in the VW Polo RX, but lost the tie-breaker to Kristensen in the Ariel Atom Cup. In the Drivers' Cup, Wolff was eliminated in the group stage.

The 2015 Race of Champions was held at the Olympic Stadium in London and Wolff again partnered David Coulthard to represent Team Scotland. In the Nations Cup, the pair failed to progress to the semi-finals, eliminated by Team England 2. Driving the Mercedes-AMG GT S, Wolff lost to Alex Buncombe while Coulthard was defeated by Jenson Button in the KTM X-Bow. Racing against team-mate Coulthard, Wolff was eliminated in Round 1 of the Drivers’ Cup to conclude her professional career in motorsport, retiring at the end of the 2015 season.

=== Dare To Be Different ===
Following her retirement from motorsport, Wolff co-founded Dare to be Different alongside Motor Sports Association CEO Rob Jones. Officially launched at the Autosport International show held at the National Exhibition Centre in Birmingham on 14 January 2016, the nonprofit organisation aims to increase the participation of women in motorsport.

Holding events across the United Kingdom, the initiative invites school girls between the ages of eight and 14 to participate in motor racing-related activities. Dare to be Different has a range of ambassadors including former Williams Formula One Deputy Team Principal Claire Williams, Sky Sports News and Sky Sports F1 presenter Rachel Brookes, and racing driver Tatiana Calderón.

In February 2019, Dare to be Different united with the FIA Girls on Track initiative to reach a wider audience, raising awareness to the opportunities for girls in motorsport. The first joint FIA Girls on Track - Dare to be Different event was held at the 2019 Mexico City ePrix at the Autódromo Hermanos Rodríguez.

== Personal life ==
Wolff met her future husband Toto Wolff, who at the time was a co-owner of HWA AG, while racing for Mercedes-Benz in DTM. He proposed to her on a boat in Venice after eight months of dating. They married in Capri in 2011. In 2017, she gave birth to their son, Jack. She currently lives in Monaco with her husband and son.

== Awards ==
On 8 October 2013, Wolff was awarded an Honorary Fellowship at the University of Edinburgh "in recognition of her role as an ambassador for women in sport". She had interrupted her studies at Edinburgh's Business School in 2001 in order to turn professional. Wolff was honoured as a Member of the Order of the British Empire (MBE) on the 2017 New Year Honours list for services to Women in Sport. She also received the Icon Award from the Vital Voices foundation in April 2026.

== Racing record ==
=== Career summary ===
Season	Series	Team	Races	Wins	Poles	F/Laps	Podiums	Points	Position
2002	Formula Renault UK	Team DFR	11	0	0	0	0	45	18th
2003	Formula Renault UK	Motaworld Racing	17	0	0	0	1	215	9th
2004	Formula Renault UK	Comtec Racing with Duckhams	20	0	0	0	3	284	5th
2005	British Formula 3	Alan Docking Racing	2	0	0	0	0	2	18th
2006	Deutsche Tourenwagen Masters	Mücke Motorsport	10	0	0	0	0	0	17th
2007	Deutsche Tourenwagen Masters	Mücke Motorsport	10	0	0	0	0	0	20th
2008	Deutsche Tourenwagen Masters	Persson Motorsport	11	0	0	0	0	0	18th
2009	Deutsche Tourenwagen Masters	Persson Motorsport	10	0	0	0	0	0	16th
2010	Deutsche Tourenwagen Masters	Persson Motorsport	11	0	0	0	0	4	13th
2011	Deutsche Tourenwagen Masters	Persson Motorsport	10	0	0	0	0	0	18th
2012	Formula One	Williams F1 Team	Development driver						
2012	Deutsche Tourenwagen Masters	Persson Motorsport	10	0	0	0	0	0	22nd
2013	Formula One	Williams F1 Team	Development driver						
2014	Formula One	Williams Martini Racing	Test driver						
2015	Formula One	Williams Martini Racing	Test driver						

=== Complete Formula Renault 2.0 UK results ===
(key) (Races in bold indicate pole position) (Races in italics indicate fastest lap)

Year	Team	1	2	3	4	5	6	7	8	9	10	11	12	13	14	15	16	17	18	19	20	Pos	Points
2002	Team DFR	BRH; Ret	OUL; 10	THR; 20	SIL; 18	THR; 16	BRH; 15	CRO; 21	SNE; 21	SNE; 15	KNO; 14	BRH; 15	DON	DON								18th	45
2003	Motaworld Racing	SNE; 1; 10	SNE; 2; 9	BRH; 12	THR; 11	SIL; Ret	ROC; 7	CRO; 1; 13	CRO; 2; 11	DON; 1; 9	DON; 2; 10	SNE; 3	BRH; 1; 4	BRH; 2; 7	DON; 1 Ret	DON; 2; 4	OUL; 1; 10	OUL; 2; 5				9th	215
2004	Comtec Racing with Duckhams	THR; 1; 8	THR; 2; 12	BRH; 1; 2	BRH; 2; 3	SIL; 1; 11	SIL; 2; 10	OUL; 1; 4	OUL; 2; 6	THR; 1; 5	THR; 2; 2	CRO; 1; 6	CRO; 2; 9	KNO; 1; 14	KNO; 2; 11	BRH; 1; 7	BRH; 2; 8	SNE; 1; 10	SNE; 2; 13	DON; 1; 6	DON; 2 Ret	5th	284

=== Complete British Formula Three results ===
(key) (Races in bold indicate pole position) (Races in italics indicate fastest lap)

Year	Team	1	2	3	4	5	6	7	8	9	10	11	12	13	14	15	16	17	18	19	20	21	22	23	24	Pos	Points
2005	Alan Docking Racing	DON; 1; 9	DON; 2; 11	SPA; 1	SPA; 2	CRO; 1	CRO; 2	KNO; 1	KNO; 2	THR; 1	THR; 2	CAS; 1	CAS; 2	MZA; 1	MZA; 2	MZA; 3	SIL; 1	SIL; 2	SIL; 3	NÜR; 1	NÜR; 2	MON; 1	MON; 2	SIL; 1	SIL; 2	18th	2

=== Complete Deutsche Tourenwagen Masters results ===
(key) (Races in bold indicate pole position) (Races in italics indicate fastest lap)

Year	Team	Car	1	2	3	4	5	6	7	8	9	10	11	Pos	Points
2006	Mücke Motorsport	AMG-Mercedes C-Klasse 2004	HOC; 10	LAU; 15	OSC; 15	BRH; 16	NOR; 14†	NÜR; Ret	ZAN; 12	CAT; 15	BUG; 13	HOC; 9		17th	0
2007	Mücke Motorsport	AMG-Mercedes C-Klasse 2006	HOC; Ret	OSC; 16	LAU; 12	BRH; 16	NOR; 16	MUG; 10	ZAN; 17	NÜR; 18	CAT; Ret	HOC; 14		20th	0
2008	Persson Motorsport	AMG-Mercedes C-Klasse 2007	HOC; 16	OSC; 14	MUG; 15	LAU; 17†	NOR; 10	ZAN; 15	NÜR; 12	BRH; 19	CAT; Ret	BUG; 12	HOC; Ret	18th	0
2009	Persson Motorsport	AMG-Mercedes C-Klasse 2008	HOC; Ret	LAU; 11	NOR; 10	ZAN; 11	OSC; 10	NÜR; 11	BRH; 13	CAT; 15	DIJ; 14	HOC; 16†		16th	0
2010	Persson Motorsport	AMG-Mercedes C-Klasse 2008	HOC; 11	VAL; 10	LAU; 7	NOR; 15	NÜR; Ret	ZAN; 15	BRH; Ret	OSC; 10	HOC; 7	ADR; 14	SHA; 11	13th	4
2011	Persson Motorsport	AMG-Mercedes C-Klasse 2008	HOC; 12	ZAN; 12	SPL; 13	LAU; DNS	NOR; 13	NÜR; 14	BRH; 14	OSC; Ret	VAL; 11	HOC; 15		18th	0
2012	Persson Motorsport	AMG Mercedes C-Coupé	HOC; 12	LAU; 21	BRH; 20†	SPL; 14	NOR; Ret	NÜR; 17	ZAN; 12	OSC; Ret	VAL; 13	HOC; 13		22nd	0
Sources:

- † — Retired, but was classified as she completed 90 per cent of the winner's race distance.

=== Complete Formula One participations ===
(key) (Races in bold indicate pole position) (Races in italics indicates fastest lap)

Year	Entrant	Chassis	Engine	1	2	3	4	5	6	7	8	9	10	11	12	13	14	15	16	17	18	19	WDC	Points
2014	Williams Martini Racing	Williams FW36	Mercedes PU106A Hybrid 1.6 V6 t	AUS	MAL	BHR	CHN	ESP	MON	CAN	AUT	GBR; TD	GER; TD	HUN	BEL	ITA	SIN	JPN	RUS	USA	BRA	ABU	–	–
2015	Williams Martini Racing	Williams FW37	Mercedes PU106B Hybrid 1.6 V6 t	AUS	MAL	CHN	BHR	ESP; TD	MON	CAN	AUT	GBR; TD	HUN	BEL	ITA	SIN	JPN	RUS	USA	MEX	BRA	ABU	–	–
