= 2013 Race of Champions =

Motor racing competition

Seasons
- ← 2012 2014 →

Layout of the Track

The 2013 Race of Champions was due to be the 26th running of the Race of Champions, and was due to take place over 14–15 December 2013 at the Rajamangala Stadium in Bangkok, Thailand. However the event was cancelled on 2 December due to political unrest in Bangkok due to the 2013–2014 Thai political crisis.

== Participants ==
Champions from numerous series were invited, while also invited was nine-time 24 Hours of Le Mans winner Tom Kristensen.

Listed below are drivers who had been announced to compete prior to the event's cancellation.

Team	Drivers	2013 series
Australia	Mick Doohan	none
Australia	Jamie Whincup	V8 Supercars
Austria	Felix Baumgartner	VW Scirocco R-Cup
France	Sébastien Ogier	WRC
Germany	Michael Schumacher	WSKC
Germany	Sebastian Vettel	F1
(United Kingdom) Great Britain	David Coulthard	none
(United Kingdom) Great Britain	Susie Wolff	none
India	Karun Chandhok	FIA GT
India	Narain Karthikeyan	Auto GP
Scandinavia	(Sweden) Mattias Ekström	DTM
Scandinavia	(Denmark) Tom Kristensen	WEC
Switzerland	Fabio Leimer	GP2

== Cars ==
Cars that had been announced.

- Ariel Atom
- Audi R8 LMS
- KTM X-Bow
- Euro Racecar
- ROC Car
- Toyota GT86
- Volkswagen Scirocco

== The track ==
A 697 metres tarmac track was constructed in the Rajamangala Stadium. The track had a bridge to connect the outer lane with the inner lane in an 8 shape track. All the races were planned to be 2 laps (1.394 km).
