= Andy Priaulx =

British racing driver (born 1974)

Andy Priaulx MBE
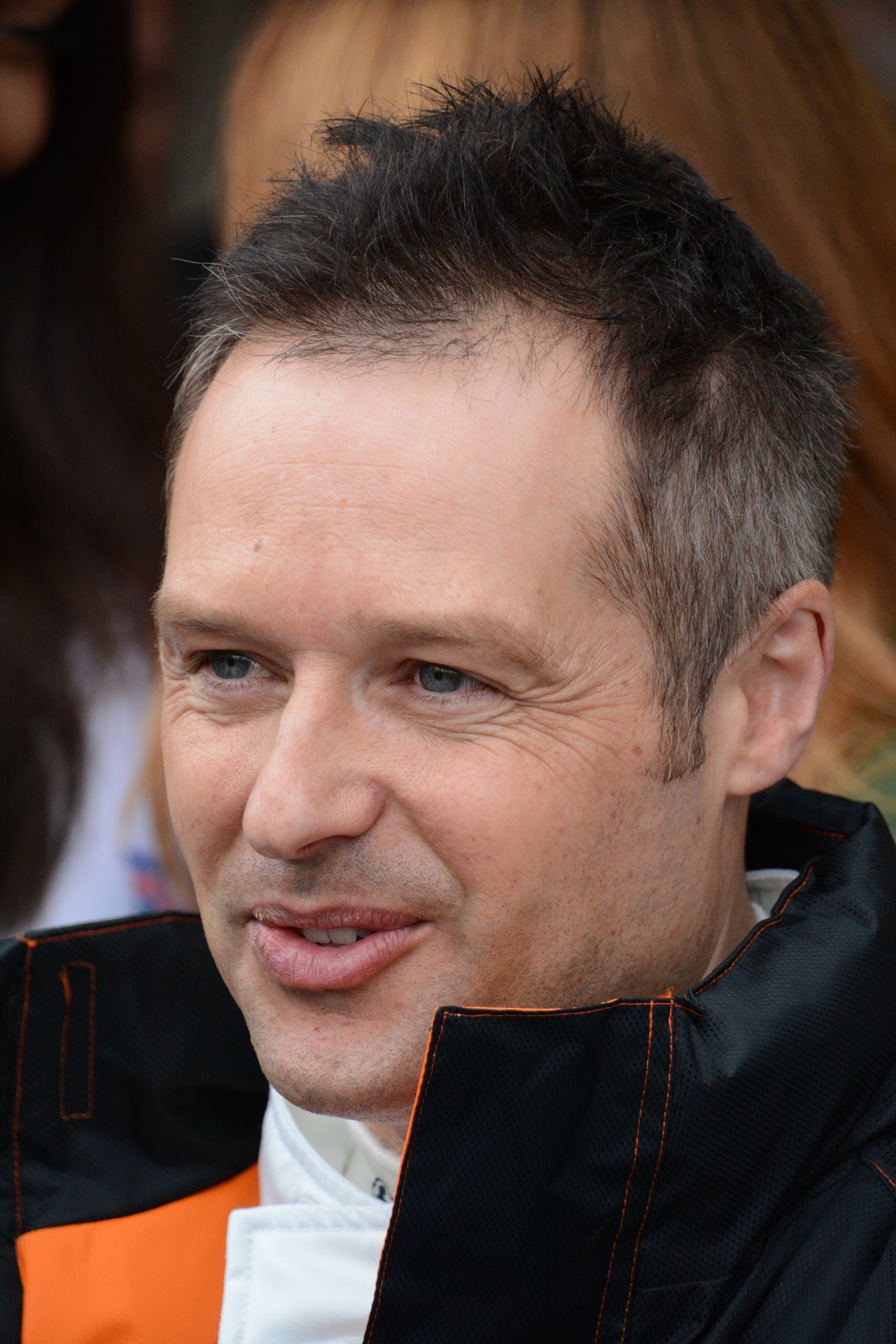
- Priaulx in 2015
- Nationality: (United Kingdom) British
- Born: Andrew Graham Priaulx; 7 August 1974 (age 52) Guernsey
- Relatives: Sebastian Priaulx (son)

FIA World Endurance Championship career
- Debut season: 2016
- Current team: Ford Chip Ganassi Team UK
- Categorisation: FIA Platinum (until 2025); FIA Gold (2026–)
- Car number: 67
- Starts: 27
- Wins: 4
- Poles: 4
- Fastest laps: 2
- Best finish: 3rd in 2017

Previous series
- 1998–99 2000–01 2001–02 2003–04 2005–2010 2012–2013: Renault Spider Cup; British F3; British Touring Car Championship; European Touring Car Championship; World Touring Car Championship; Deutsche Tourenwagen Masters

Championship titles
- 1999 2004 2005–2007: Renault Spider Cup; European Touring Car Championship; World Touring Car Championship

Awards
- 1999 2004: Autosport British Club Driver of the Year; Autosport British Competition Driver of the Year

24 Hours of Le Mans career
- Years: 2010–2011, 2016–2019
- Teams: BMW Motorsport
- Best finish: 15th (3rd LMGTE Pro) (2011)
- Class wins: 0

Andrew Graham Priaulx, MBE (/priːˈoʊ/ pree-OH born 7 August 1974) is a British racing driver from Guernsey. In 2019 he raced for Ford Chip Ganassi Team UK in the FIA World Endurance Championship, and Cyan Racing Lynk & Co in the FIA World Touring Car Cup, having been a former BMW factory driver.

Proaulx is a European Touring Car Championship champion, three times World Touring Car Championship champion and the only FIA Touring Car champion to win an international-level championship for four consecutive years (2004 to 2007). The previous record was Roberto Ravaglia's three successive championships (1986–1988).

== Racing career ==
Born in Guernsey, Priaulx has competed in many types of motorsport, beginning in karting at the minimum age of eight. After a brief flirtation with powerboat racing, he started hillclimbing while still a teenager, sharing a car with his father Graham. It was quickly apparent that he had great natural ability, and few people were surprised when he took the British Hillclimb Championship title in 1995.

After this, Priaulx made the switch to circuit racing, where after a relatively low-key couple of years in Formula Renault UK Championship and British Formula 3 he eventually demonstrated his skills were transferable by switching to the Renault Spider championship in 1998, completely dominating it in 1999. His career stalled somewhat when he returned to British Formula 3 in 2000–01. He had some success at this level, but despite finishing sixth in the championship in 2001 was unable to progress further up the single-seater ladder.

=== Touring cars ===
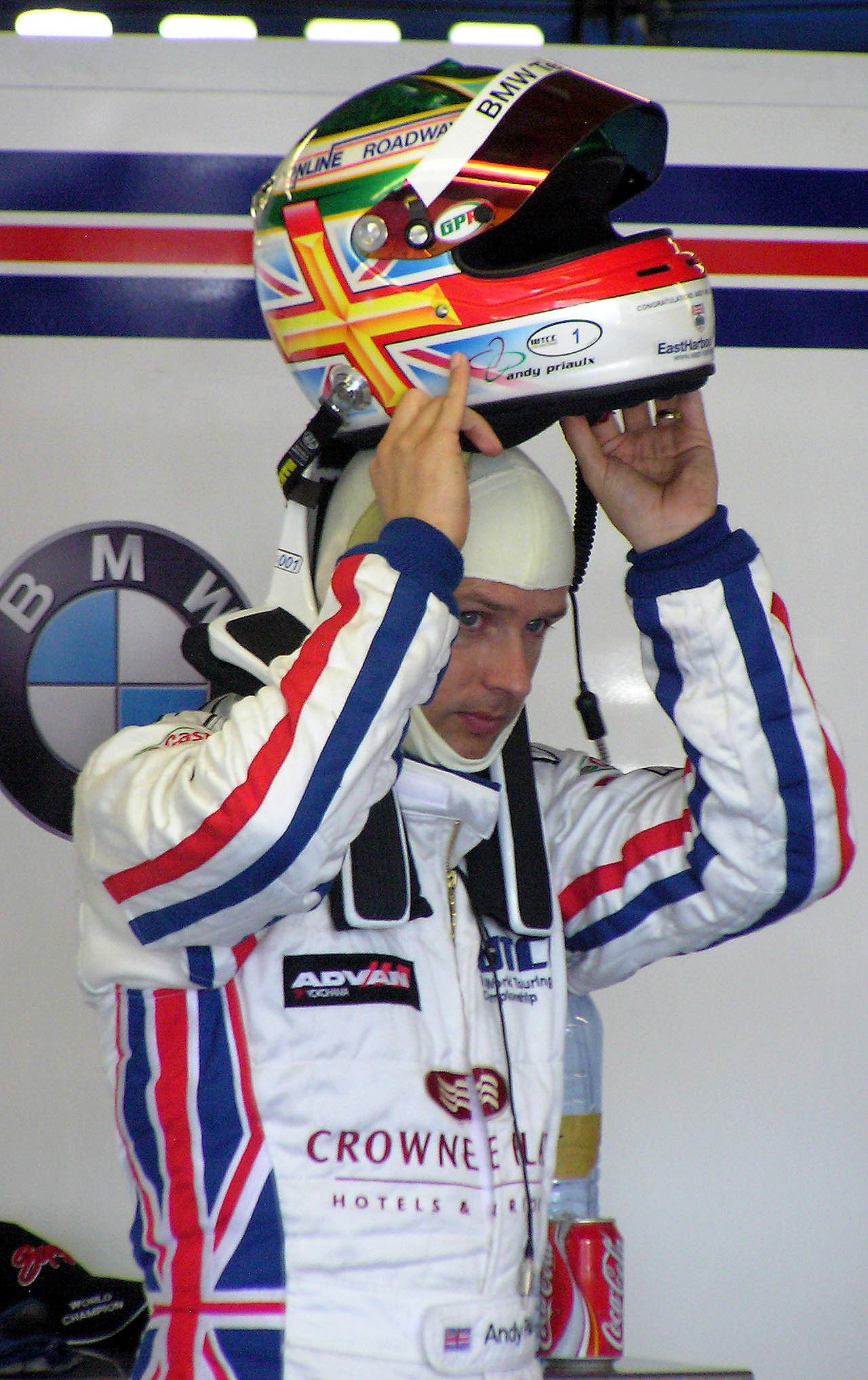
Priaulx in 2007.

In 2001, Priaulx had a pair of British Touring Car Championship (BTCC) guest drives for the Egg Vauxhall team, standing in for the suspended Phil Bennett. He stunned the regulars by taking pole position on his debut at Oulton Park, demonstrating that his future appeared to lie in that direction.

The following year, Priaulx was signed by the works Honda BTCC team for their 2002 campaign. He won one race and finished on the podium in two others, and the following season was signed by Bart Mampaey's BMW UK team for their European Touring Car Championship (ETCC) effort. He was in contention for the title until late in the year, eventually finishing third. Priaulx also occasionally guested in Australian V8 Supercar racing, competing at the Bathurst 1000km in 2002 with Yvan Muller in a Kmart Racing Commodore and 2003 with Cameron McLean again in a Kmart Commodore, and also the Sandown 500 km in 2003.

2004 saw Priaulx win a major circuit racing championship, as he became ETCC champion after a season-long battle with Dirk Müller. Both men obtained the same number of points, but Priaulx had won five races as against Müller's three, and this was sufficient to hand the Priaulx the title.

Priaulx repeated his 2004 success in 2005, 2006 and 2007, clinching the World Touring Car Championship (WTCC, essentially the same series, with two races outside Europe in 2005 and three in 2006) at the final round in Macau. In 2005, he won the crown with two second-place finishes in the final round when his nearest rivals, Dirk Müller and Fabrizio Giovanardi both failed to score. The following year, a win in the opening race of the final meeting left him needing to finish fifth in the final event to beat Jörg Müller by a single point, which he achieved.

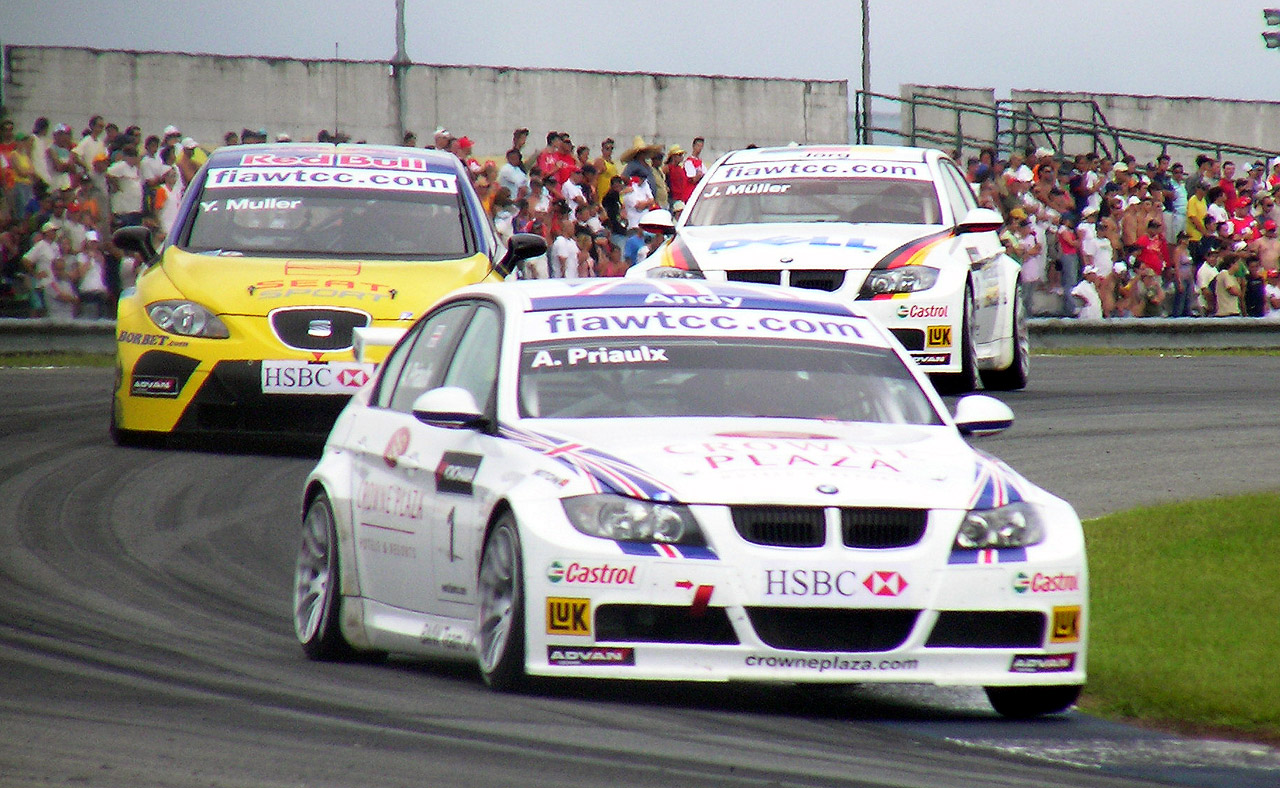
Priaulx driving a BMW 320si WTCC car.

Heading into the final meeting of the 2007 WTCC season at Macau, Priaulx was joint leader of the championship alongside former BTCC champion Yvan Muller. He came eighth in the first race and won from pole position in the second race to claim his and BMW's third WTCC championship in a row.

Priaulx was appointed Member of the Order of the British Empire (MBE) in the 2008 Birthday Honours.

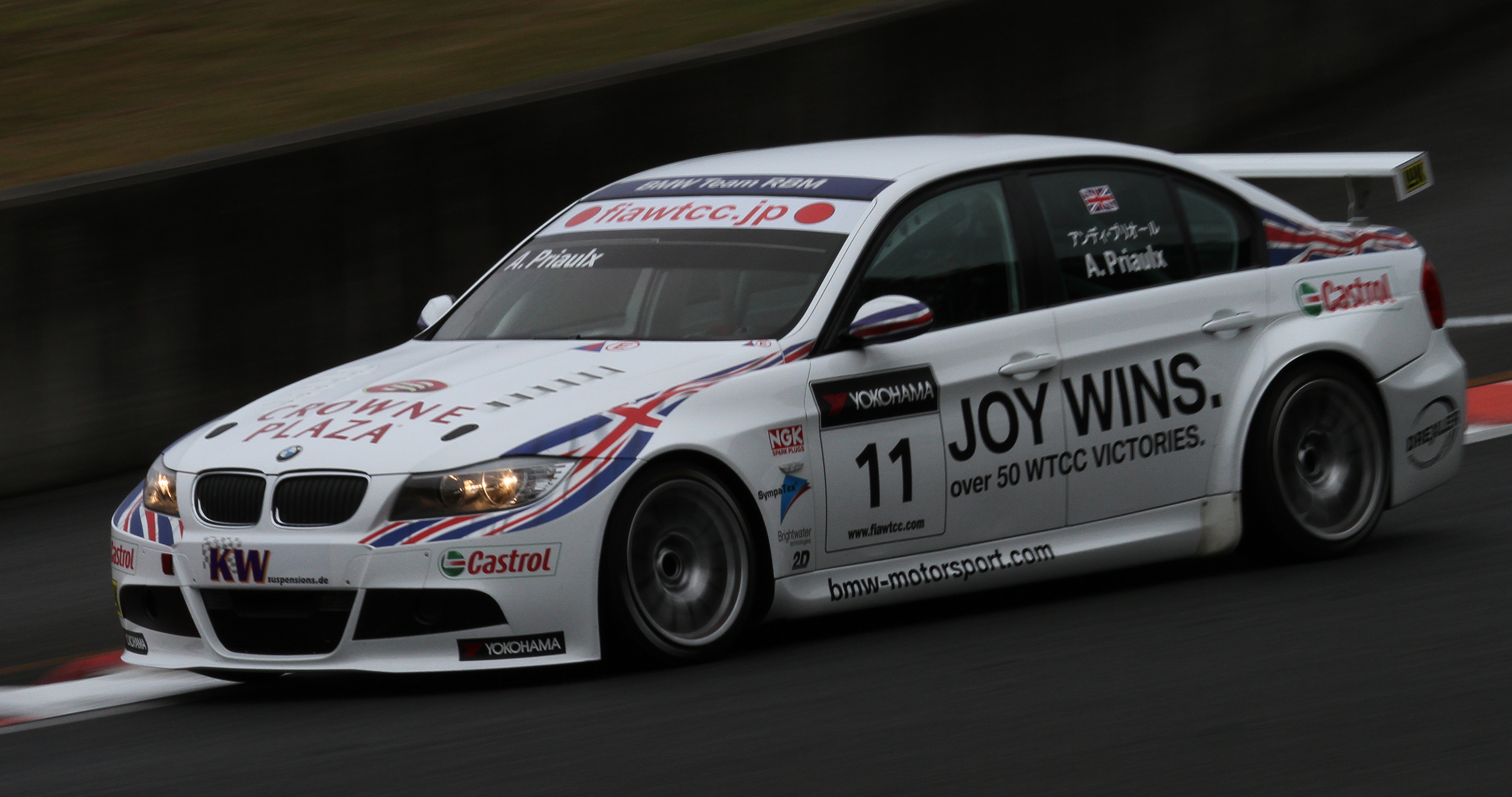
Priaulx during the first free practice session of the 2010 FIA WTCC Race of Japan.

Priaulx again raced in the World Touring Car Championship for BMW Team UK in 2009, finishing fourth in the standings. As well as the WTCC, he competed in selected rounds of the American Le Mans Series for BMW and a number of races in the Australian V8 Supercars championship, driving a Walkinshaw Racing Holden with David Reynolds at the Phillip Island and Bathurst endurance races. In 2010, Priaulx continued to race in the World Touring Car Championship for BMW and competed in several races for BMW in the Le Mans Series, 2010 Armor All Gold Coast 600 in V8 Supercars with Craig Lowndes, Race of Champions, as well as the Le Mans 24 Hours.

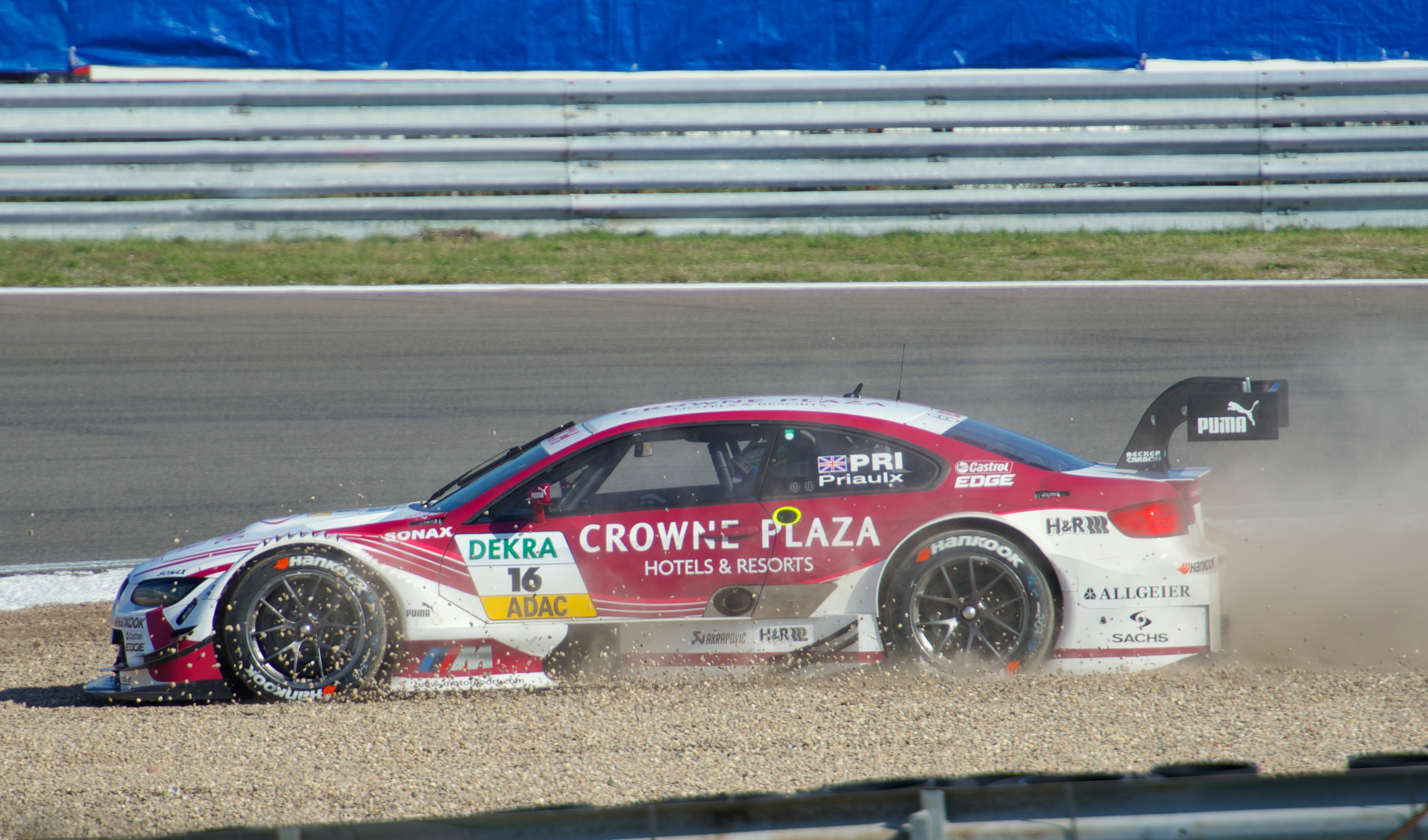
Priaulx competing in the 2013 DTM season.

On 5 December 2010, BMW announced that it would not be continuing its factory effort in the World Touring Car Championship from 2011 onwards. It was announced on 25 January 2011, that Priaulx contest the Intercontinental Le Mans Cup for BMW, as well as undertaking testing duties for BMW with cars from other racing categories.

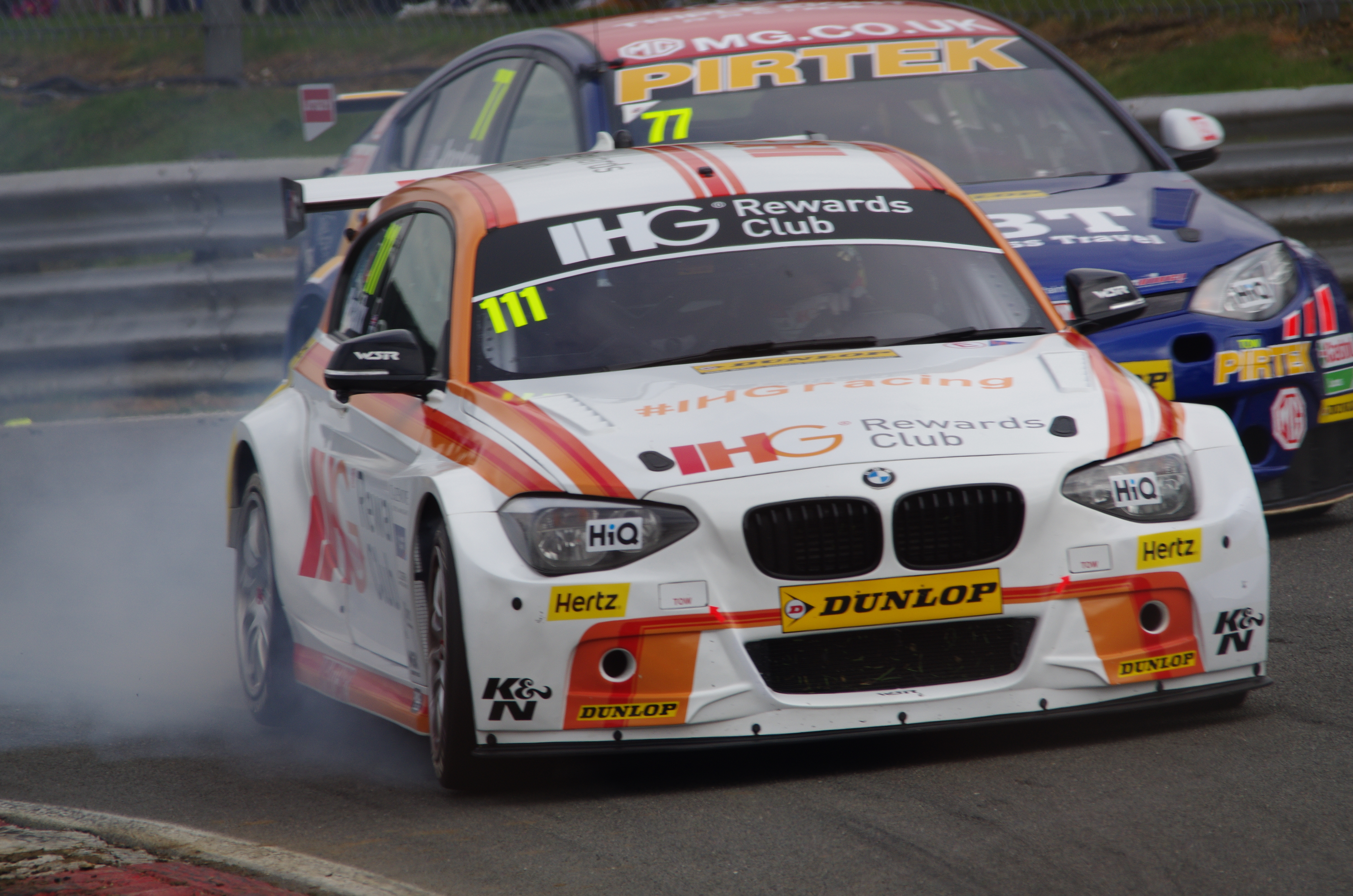
Priaulx driving for BMW at Brands Hatch during the 2015 British Touring Car Championship season.

Priaulx spent the 2012 and 2013 seasons racing for BMW in the Deutsche Tourenwagen Masters, scoring his best result in the final round of the 2013 season at the Hockenheimring, where he finished in sixth after starting in third. He switched to racing in the United SportsCar Championship in the United States for 2014. In January 2015, it was announced at Autosport International that Priaulx would return to the British Touring Car Championship for 2015 with West Surrey Racing, campaigning a BMW 125i M Sport, combining his BTCC programme with racing works BMWs in the European Le Mans Series and the North American Endurance Cup.

On 10 December 2018, it was announced that Priaulx would join Lynk & Co Cyan Racing for the 2019 World Touring Car Cup season, partnering former WTCC champions Yvan Muller, Thed Björk and Yvan's nephew Yann Ehrlacher. On 17 November 2019, Priaulx secured his maiden win in the FIA World Touring Car Cup in Macau.

=== Ford WEC ===
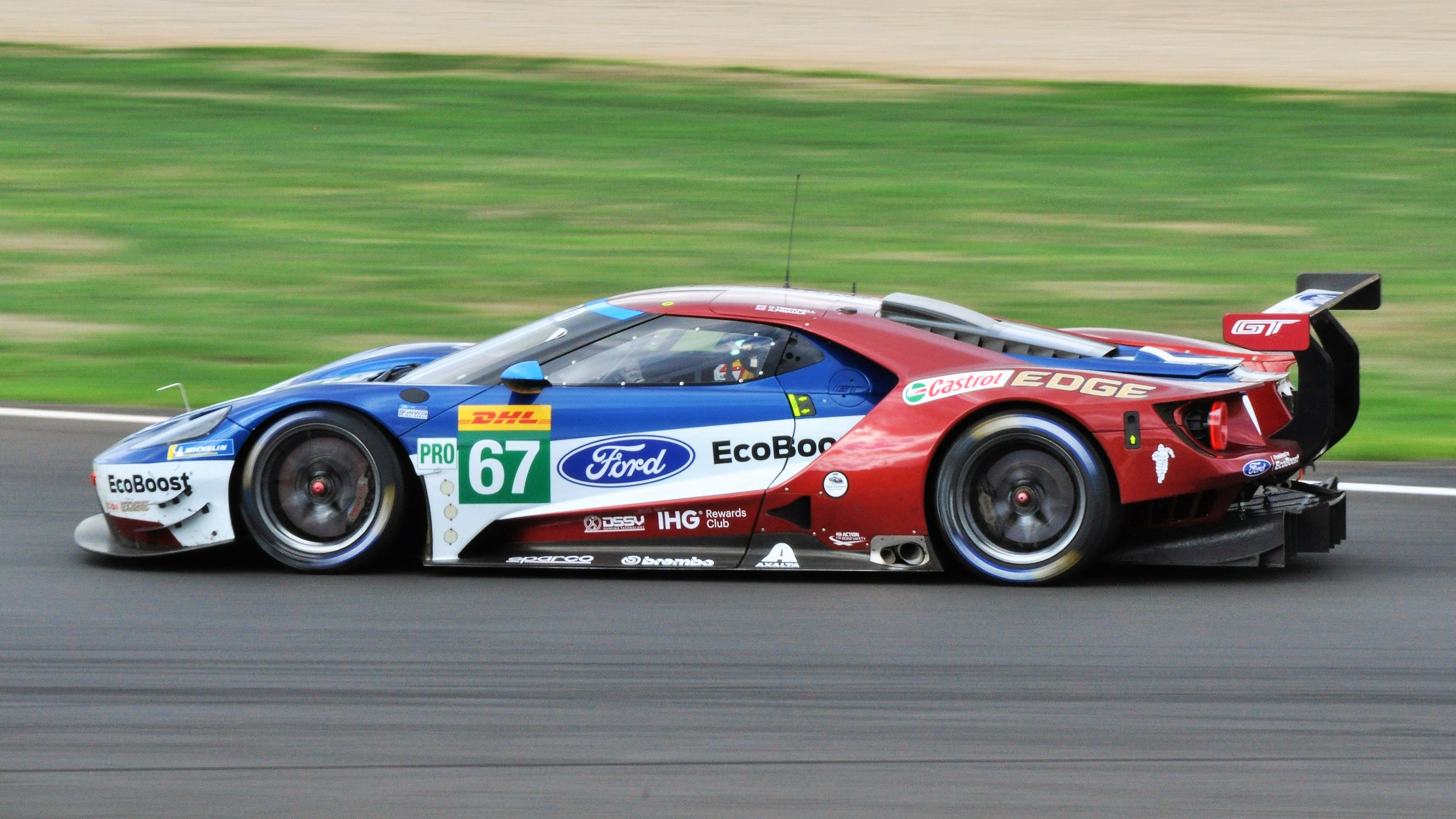
Priaulx driving in the 2018 6 Hours of Silverstone.

On 5 December 2015, it was announced that Priaulx had parted ways with BMW after a 13-year stint with the German manufacturer to join Ford Chip Ganassi Team UK for their upcoming debut in the 2016 FIA World Endurance Championship season. He was officially unveiled as a Ford driver on 5 January 2016 alongside teammates Marino Franchitti, Stefan Mücke, and Olivier Pla.

== Personal life ==
Priaulx's son Sebastian Priaulx is also a racing driver, and in May of 2018, both Andy and Sebastian competed together in the C1 24hr at Rockingham. He competed in the 2019 British GT Championship and was in contention for the GT4 title, driving with Scott Maxwell, but lost out on the title to Tom Canning and Ash Hand by 8.5 points.

== Nationality ==
Priaulx is from Guernsey, a crown dependency of the United Kingdom. As a proud Guernseyman, Priaulx has always incorporated the Guernsey flag prominently in his helmet designs. He has occasionally been mistakenly identified as French due to his surname, which is common in Francophone countries; a French national flag was displayed above the podium at the first race in Curitiba in the 2007 WTCC season.

== Racing record ==
=== Career summary ===
Season	Series	Team	Races	Wins	Poles	F/laps	Podiums	Points	Position
1995	British Hill Climb Championship	N/A	14	10	N/A	N/A	12	128	**1st**
1996	International Formula Renault Sport Championship	Startline Racing	?	0	0	0	0	0	NC
1997	British Formula 3 Championship	SpeedSport F3 TOM'S	4	0	0	0	0	1	26th
1998	Renault Spider Cup GB	Mardi Gras Motorsport	?	0	1	2	2	?	7th
1998	Formula Palmer Audi Winter Series	MotorSport Vision	4	0	1	?	3	93	**2nd**
1999	Renault Spider Cup GB	Mardi Gras Motorsport	13	13	13	11	13	430	**1st**
2000	British Formula 3 Championship	Promatecme UK	14	0	1	0	3	64	9th
2000	French Formula 3 Championship	?	2	0	0	0	0	0	NC
2000	Macau Grand Prix	Lucozade Motorsport Team	1	0	0	0	0	N/A	8th
2000	Korea Super Prix	Lucozade Motorsport Team	1	0	0	0	0	N/A	DNF
2001	British Formula 3 Championship	Alan Docking Racing	26	3	1	0	7	146	6th
2001	Masters of Formula 3	Alan Docking Racing	1	0	0	0	0	N/A	22nd
2001	Macau Grand Prix	Promatecme UK	1	0	0	0	0	N/A	DNF
2001	Korea Super Prix	Promatecme UK	1	0	0	0	1	N/A	**2nd**
2001	British Touring Car Championship	egg:sport	2	0	2	0	1	15	11th
2001	World Series by Nissan	PSN GD Racing	2	0	0	0	0	8	18th
2002	British Touring Car Championship	Honda Racing	20	1	3	1	4	116	5th
2002	V8 Supercar Championship	K-Mart Racing	2	0	0	0	0	0	NC
2003	European Touring Car Championship	BMW Team Great Britain	20	3	1	2	8	100	**3rd**
2003	V8 Supercar Championship	K-Mart Racing	2	0	0	0	0	148	47th
2004	European Touring Car Championship	BMW Team UK	20	5	1	6	9	111	**1st**
2004	Belcar	BMW Motorsport	1	0	0	0	1	0	NC†
2005	World Touring Car Championship	BMW Team UK	20	1	1	3	11	101	**1st**
2005	Formula One	BMW Williams F1 Team	Test driver						
2006	World Touring Car Championship	BMW Team UK	20	5	3	1	6	73	**1st**
2007	World Touring Car Championship	BMW Team UK	22	3	0	0	8	92	**1st**
2008	World Touring Car Championship	BMW Team UK	24	1	0	3	9	81	4th
2009	World Touring Car Championship	BMW Team UK	24	2	0	4	7	84	4th
2009	V8 Supercar Championship	Walkinshaw Racing	3	0	0	0	0	253	36th
2009	American Le Mans Series - GT2	BMW Rahal Letterman Racing	1	0	0	0	0	0	NC†
2010	World Touring Car Championship	BMW Team RBM	24	6	1	5	6	246	4th
2010	Le Mans Series - LMGT2	BMW Team Schnitzer	1	0	0	0	0	11	18th
2010	24 Hours of Le Mans - LMGT2	BMW Motorsport	1	0	0	0	0	N/A	DNF
2010	V8 Supercar Championship	Triple Eight Race Engineering	2	0	0	0	1	0	NC†
2010	American Le Mans Series - GT	BMW Rahal Letterman Racing	2	0	0	0	1	23	25th
2011	Intercontinental Le Mans Cup - LMGTE Pro	BMW Motorsport	7	1	0	0	4	152	**2nd**
2011	Le Mans Series - LMGTE Pro	BMW Motorsport	2	0	0	0	1	0	NC†
2011	24 Hours of Le Mans - LMGTE Pro	BMW Motorsport	1	0	0	0	1	N/A	**3rd**
2011	International V8 Supercar Championship	Triple Eight Race Engineering	2	0	0	0	0	45	79th
2011	American Le Mans Series - GT	BMW Team RLL	1	1	0	0	1	30	17th
2012	Deutsche Tourenwagen Masters	BMW Team RBM	10	0	0	0	0	24	13th
2013	Deutsche Tourenwagen Masters	BMW Team RMG	10	0	0	0	0	10	20th
2013	International V8 Supercar Championship	Triple Eight Race Engineering	1	0	0	0	0	156	55th
2013	Rolex Sports Car Series - GT	Turner Motorsport	1	0	0	0	0	0	NC†
2014	United SportsCar Championship - GTLM	BMW Team RLL	11	0	1	0	3	298	8th
2015	British Touring Car Championship	Team IHG Rewards Club	27	2	2	2	8	247	8th
2015	European Le Mans Series - LMGTE	BMW Sports Trophy Marc VDS	5	1	0	0	2	79	**2nd**
2015	United SportsCar Championship - GTD	Turner Motorsport	3	0	0	0	0	66	22nd
2016	FIA World Endurance Championship - LMGTE Pro	Ford Chip Ganassi Team UK	9	2	1	1	3	117.5	5th
2016	24 Hours of Le Mans - LMGTE Pro	Ford Chip Ganassi Team UK	1	0	0	0	0	N/A	9th
2016	WeatherTech SportsCar Championship	Ford Chip Ganassi Racing	1	0	0	0	0	27	27th
2017	FIA World Endurance Championship - LMGTE Pro	Ford Chip Ganassi Team UK	9	2	1	1	4	142.5	**3rd**
2017	24 Hours of Le Mans - LMGTE Pro	Ford Chip Ganassi Team UK	1	0	0	0	1	N/A	**2nd**
2017	WeatherTech SportsCar Championship - GTLM	Ford Chip Ganassi Team UK	1	0	0	0	0	26	23rd
2018	24 Hours of Le Mans - LMGTE Pro	Ford Chip Ganassi Team UK	1	0	0	0	0	N/A	12th
2018-19	FIA World Endurance Championship - LMGTE Pro	Ford Chip Ganassi Team UK	8	0	2	1	4	90	4th
2019	World Touring Car Cup	Cyan Performance Lynk & Co	30	1	0	1	1	122	18th
2019	British GT Championship - GT4	Multimatic Motorsports	1	0	0	0	0	0	NC
2019	24 Hours of Le Mans - LMGTE Pro	Ford Chip Ganassi Team UK	1	0	0	0	0	N/A	4th
2024	Nürburgring Langstrecken-Serie - VT2-FWD	Walkenhorst Motorsport							
2024	Nürburgring Langstrecken-Serie - VT2-R+4WD	Walkenhorst Motorsport							

^{†} As Priaulx was a guest driver, he was ineligible to score points.

=== Complete British Touring Car Championship results ===
(key) (Races in bold indicate pole position – 1 point awarded all races) (Races in italics indicate fastest lap – 1 point awarded all races) (* signifies that driver lead feature race for at least one lap – 1 point awarded)

Year	Team	Car	Class	1	2	3	4	5	6	7	8	9	10	11	12	13	14	15	16	17	18	19	20	21	22	23	24	25	26	27	28	29	30	Pen.	Pos	Pts
2001	egg:sport	Vauxhall Astra Coupé	T	BRH; 1	BRH; 2	THR; 1	THR; 2	OUL; 1	OUL; 2	SIL; 1	SIL; 2	MON; 1	MON; 2	DON; 1	DON; 2	KNO; 1	KNO; 2	SNE; 1	SNE; 2	CRO; 1	CRO; 2	**OUL**; **1** ovr:2 cls:2	**OUL**; **2** Ret	SIL; 1	SIL; 2	DON; 1	DON; 2	BRH; 1	BRH; 2						11th	15
2002	Honda Racing	Honda Civic Type-R	T	BRH; 1 ovr:12 cls:8	BRH; 2 ovr:5 cls:5	OUL; 1 ovr:7 cls:7	OUL; 2 Ret	THR; 1 ovr:4 cls:4	THR; 2 ovr:5 cls:5	SIL; 1 ovr:4 cls:4	SIL; 2 ovr:6 cls:6	MON; 1 ovr:6 cls:6	MON; 2 Ret	CRO; 1 ovr:4 cls:4	CRO; 2 ovr:2* cls:2	SNE; 1 ovr:3 cls:3	SNE; 2 Ret	**KNO**; **1** ovr:7 cls:7	**KNO**; **2** ovr:1* cls:1	BRH; 1 ovr:11 cls:11	BRH; 2 ovr:7* cls:7	DON; 1 ovr:2 cls:2	**DON**; **2** ovr:4* cls:4											−10	5th	116
2015	Team IHG Rewards Club	BMW 125i M Sport		**BRH**; **1**; 9*	BRH; 2; 2	BRH; 3; 8	DON; 1; 12	DON; 2; 10	DON; 3 NC	THR; 1; 5	THR; 2 NC	THR; 3; 13	OUL; 1; 3	OUL; 2; 15	OUL; 3 Ret	CRO; 1; 1*	CRO; 2; 4	CRO; 3; 2	SNE; 1; 5	SNE; 2; 3	SNE; 3; 3	**KNO**; **1**; 3	KNO; 2; 5	KNO; 3; 4	ROC; 1	ROC; 2	ROC; 3	SIL; 1; 23	SIL; 2; 1*	SIL; 3; 21	BRH; 1; 8	BRH; 2; 9	BRH; 3; 10		8th	247

=== Complete V8 Supercar Championship results ===
Year	Team	Car	1	2	3	4	5	6	7	8	9	10	11	12	13	14	15	16	17	18	19	20	21	22	23	24	25	26	27	28	29	30	31	32	33	34	35	36	Final pos	Points
2002	K-Mart Racing	Holden Commodore VX	ADE; R1	ADE; R2	PHI; R3	PHI; R4	EAS; R5	EAS; R6	EAS; R7	HID; R8	HID; R9	HID; R10	CAN; R11	CAN; R12	CAN; R13	BAR; R14	BAR; R15	BAR; R16	ORA; R17	ORA; R18	WIN; R19	WIN; R20	QLD; R21; Ret	BAT; R22; Ret	SUR; R23	SUR; R24	PUK; R25	PUK; R26	PUK; R27	SAN; R28	SAN; R29								NC	0
2003	K-Mart Racing	Holden Commodore VX	ADE; R1	ADE; R2	PHI; R3	EAS; R4	WIN; R5	BAR; R6	BAR; R7	BAR; R8	HID; R9	HID; R10	HID; R11	QLD; R12	ORA; R13	SAN; R14; 12	BAT; R15; Ret	SUR; R16	SUR; R17	PUK; R18	PUK; R19	PUK; R20	EAS; R21	EAS; R22															47th	148
2009	Walkinshaw Racing	Holden Commodore VE	ADE; R1	ADE; R2	HAM; R3	HAM; R4	WIN; R5	WIN; R6	SYM; R7	SYM; R8	HID; R9	HID; R10	TOW; R11	TOW; R12	SAN; R13	SAN; R14	QLD; R15	QLD; R16	PHI; Q 28	PHI; R17; 16	BAT; R18; 12	SUR; R19	SUR; R20	PHI; R21	PHI; R22	BAR; R23	BAR; R22	SYD; R23	SYD; R24										36th	253
2010	Triple Eight Race Engineering	Holden Commodore VE	YMC; R1	YMC; R2	BHR; R3	BHR; R4	ADE; R5	ADE; R6	HAM; R7	HAM; R8	QLD; R9	QLD; R10	WIN; R11	WIN; R12	HID; R13	HID; R14	TOW; R15	TOW; R16	PHI; Q	PHI; R17	BAT; R18	SUR; R19; 2	SUR; R20; 10	SYM; R21	SYM; R22	SAN; R23	SAN; R24	SYD; R25	SYD; R26										NC	0 +
2011	Triple Eight Race Engineering	Holden Commodore VE	YMC; R1	YMC; R2	ADE; R3	ADE; R4	HAM; R5	HAM; R6	BAR; R7	BAR; R8	BAR; R9	WIN; R10	WIN; R11	HID; R12	HID; R13	TOW; R14	TOW; R15	QLD; R16	QLD; R17	QLD; R18	PHI; Q	PHI; R19	BAT; R20	SUR; R21; Ret	SUR; R22; 20	SYM; R23	SYM; R24	SAN; R25	SAN; R26	SYD; R27	SYD; R28								79th	45
2013	Triple Eight Race Engineering	Holden Commodore VF	ADE; R1	ADE; R2	SYM; R3	SYM; R4	SYM; R5	PUK; R6	PUK; R7	PUK; R8	PUK; R9	BAR; R10	BAR; R11	BAR; R12	COTA; R13	COTA; R14	COTA; R15	COTA; R16	HID; R17	HID; R18	HID; R19	TOW; R20	TOW; R21	QLD; R22	QLD; R23	QLD; R24	WIN; R25	WIN; R26	WIN; R27	SAN; R28	BAT; R29; 10	SUR; R30	SUR; R31	PHI; R32	PHI; R33	PHI; R34	SYD; R35	SYD; R36	55th	156

+ Not Eligible for points

=== Complete European Touring Car Championship results ===
(key) (Races in bold indicate pole position) (Races in italics indicate fastest lap)

Year	Team	Car	1	2	3	4	5	6	7	8	9	10	11	12	13	14	15	16	17	18	19	20	DC	Pts
2003	BMW Team Great Britain	BMW 320i	VAL; 1; 6	VAL; 2; 3	MAG; 1; 3	MAG; 2 Ret	PER; 1; 4	PER; 2; 4	BRN; 1; 4	BRN; 2; 1	DON; 1; 15	DON; 2; 5	**SPA**; **1**; 6	SPA; 2; 1	AND; 1; 8	**AND**; **2**; 2	OSC; 1; 3	OSC; 2; 1	EST; 1; 7	EST; 2; 4	MNZ; 1; 2	MNZ; 2; 6	3rd	100
2004	BMW Team UK	BMW 320i	MNZ; 1; 5	MNZ; 2; 2	VAL; 1; 4	VAL; 2; 6	MAG; 1; 8	**MAG**; **2**; 1	HOC; 1; 1	HOC; 2 Ret	BRN; 1; 1	BRN; 2; 2	DON; 1; 6	DON; 2; 1	SPA; 1; 4	SPA; 2; 5	IMO; 1; 5	IMO; 2 Ret	OSC; 1; 1	OSC; 2 Ret	**DUB**; **1**; 2	DUB; 2; 2	1st	111

=== Complete World Touring Car Championship results ===
(key) (Races in bold indicate pole position) (Races in italics indicate fastest lap)

Year	Team	Car	1	2	3	4	5	6	7	8	9	10	11	12	13	14	15	16	17	18	19	20	21	22	23	24	DC	Points
2005	BMW Team UK	BMW 320i	ITA; 1; 4	ITA; 2; 5	FRA; 1; 2	FRA; 2; 3	GBR; 1; 5	GBR; 2; 20†	SMR; 1; 3	SMR; 2; 2	MEX; 1 NC	MEX; 2; 8	BEL; 1; 2	BEL; 2 Ret	GER; 1; 1	GER; 2; 2	TUR; 1; 3	TUR; 2; 9	ESP; 1; 4	ESP; 2; 3	**MAC**; **1**; 2	MAC; 2; 2					1st	101
2006	BMW Team UK	BMW 320si	**ITA**; **1**; 1	ITA; 2 Ret	FRA; 1; 8	**FRA**; **2**; 1	GBR; 1; 8	**GBR**; **2**; 8	**GER**; **1**; 1	GER; 2; 10	BRA; 1; 8	**BRA**; **2**; 1	MEX; 1; 18	MEX; 2; 7	CZE; 1; 5	CZE; 2; 2	TUR; 1; 14	TUR; 2 Ret	ESP; 1 Ret	ESP; 2; 8	**MAC**; **1**; 1	MAC; 2; 5					1st	73
2007	BMW Team UK	BMW 320si	BRA; 1; 2	BRA; 2; 2	NED; 1; 8	**NED**; **2**; 5	ESP; 1; 5	ESP; 2; 3	FRA; 1; 6	FRA; 2; 2	CZE; 1 Ret	CZE; 2; 7	POR; 1; 6	POR; 2; 1	SWE; 1; 11	SWE; 2; 13	GER; 1; 5	GER; 2; 2	GBR; 1; 7	GBR; 2; 1	ITA; 1 NC	ITA; 2 Ret	MAC; 1; 8	**MAC**; **2**; 1			1st	92
2008	BMW Team UK	BMW 320si	BRA; 1; 4	BRA; 2; 2	MEX; 1; 10	MEX; 2; 8	ESP; 1; 7	ESP; 2; 3	FRA; 1; 8	**FRA**; **2**; 1	CZE; 1; 14	CZE; 2; 8	POR; 1; 6	POR; 2; 3	GBR; 1; 3	GBR; 2 Ret	GER; 1 Ret	GER; 2; 5	EUR; 1; 11	EUR; 2; 7	ITA; 1; 3	ITA; 2; 25†	JPN; 1; 3	JPN; 2; 22†	MAC; 1; 2	MAC; 2; 3	4th	81
2009	BMW Team UK	BMW 320si	BRA; 1; 7	BRA; 2; 9	MEX; 1; 3	MEX; 2; 2	MAR; 1; 10	MAR; 2; 15†	FRA; 1; 4	FRA; 2; 4	ESP; 1; 5	ESP; 2; 4	CZE; 1 NC	CZE; 2; 8	POR; 1; 9	POR; 2; 7	GBR; 1; 3	GBR; 2; 5	GER; 1; 1	GER; 2; 2	ITA; 1; 5	ITA; 2; 9	JPN; 1; 1	JPN; 2; 2	MAC; 1 NC	MAC; 2; 13	4th	84
2010	BMW Team RBM	BMW 320si	BRA; 1; 5	BRA; 2 Ret	MAR; 1; 8	**MAR**; **2**; 1	ITA; 1; 1	ITA; 2; 5	BEL; 1; 7	**BEL**; **2**; 1	POR; 1 Ret	POR; 2; 4	GBR; 1; 7	**GBR**; **2**; 1	CZE; 1; 5	CZE; 2; 1	GER; 1; 5	GER; 2; 1	ESP; 1; 5	ESP; 2; 4	**JPN**; **1** DSQ	JPN; 2 DSQ	MAC; 1 NC	MAC; 2; 7			4th	246

† — Did not finish the race, but was classified as he completed over 90% of the race distance.

=== Intercontinental Le Mans Cup results ===
(key) (Races in bold indicate pole position) (Races in italics indicate fastest lap)

Year	Team	Car	Class	1	2	3	4	5	6	7	Pos.	Points
2011	BMW Motorsport	BMW M3 GT2	LMGTE Pro	SEB; 1	SPA; 3	LMS; 3	IMO; 13	SIL; 4	ROA; 4	ZHU; 2	2nd	152

=== Complete Deutsche Tourenwagen Masters results ===
(key) (Races in bold indicate pole position) (Races in italics indicate fastest lap)

Year	Team	Car	1	2	3	4	5	6	7	8	9	10	Pos	Points
2012	BMW Team RBM	BMW M3 DTM	HOC; 6	LAU; 17	BRH; Ret	SPL; Ret	NOR; 7	NÜR; 19	ZAN; 13	OSC; Ret	VAL; 8	HOC; 7	13th	24
2013	BMW Team RMG	BMW M3 DTM	HOC; 17†	BRH; 19	SPL; 19	LAU; 22	NOR; 9	MSC; 20	NÜR; 16	OSC; 19	ZAN; 19	HOC; 6	20th	10

^{†} Driver did not finish, but completed 90% of the race distance

=== Complete WeatherTech SportsCar Championship results ===
(key) (Races in bold indicate pole position) (Races in italics indicate fastest lap)

Year	Entrant	Class	Chassis	Engine	1	2	3	4	5	6	7	8	9	10	11	Rank	Points
2014	BMW Team RLL	GTLM	BMW Z4 GTE	BMW 4.4 L V8	DAY; 2	SEB; 3	LBH; 6	LGA; 2	**WGL**; 10	MOS; 6	IMS; 6	ELK; 8	VIR; 4	COA; 6	PET; 10	8th	298
2015	Turner Motorsport	GTD	BMW Z4 GT3	BMW 4.4 L V8	DAY; 12	SEB; 8	LGA	DET	WGL	LIM	ELK	VIR	COA	PET; 11		22nd	66
2016	Ford Chip Ganassi Racing	P	Ford EcoBoost Riley DP	Ford EcoBoost 3.5 L V6 Turbo	DAY; 5	SEB	LBH	LGA	DET	WGL	MOS	ELK	COA	PET		27th	27
2017	Ford Chip Ganassi Team UK	GTLM	Ford GT	Ford EcoBoost 3.5 L V6 Turbo	DAY; 5	SEB	LBH	COA	WGL	MOS	LIM	ELK	VIR	LGA	PET	23rd	26

=== Complete European Le Mans Series results ===
Year	Entrant	Class	Chassis	Engine	1	2	3	4	5	Rank	Points
2015	BMW Sports Trophy Marc VDS	LMGTE	BMW Z4 GTE	BMW 4.4 L V8	SIL; 4	IMO; 4	RBR; 4	LEC; 2	EST; 1	2nd	79

=== Complete FIA World Endurance Championship results ===
(key) (Races in bold indicate pole position; races in italics indicate fastest lap)

Year	Entrant	Class	Car	Engine	1	2	3	4	5	6	7	8	9	Rank	Points
2016	Ford Chip Ganassi Team UK	LMGTE Pro	Ford GT	Ford EcoBoost 3.5 L Turbo V6	SIL; 4	SPA; 2	LMS; 10	NÜR; 12	MEX; 5	COA; 4	FUJ; 1	**SHA**; 1	BHR; 4	5th	117.5
2017	Ford Chip Ganassi Team UK	LMGTE Pro	Ford GT	Ford EcoBoost 3.5 L Turbo V6	**SIL**; 1	SPA; 4	LMS; 2	NÜR; 5	MEX; 4	COA; 7	FUJ; 13	SHA; 1	BHR; 3	3rd	142.5
2018–19	Ford Chip Ganassi Team UK	LMGTE Pro	Ford GT	Ford EcoBoost 3.5 L Turbo V6	**SPA**; Ret	LMS; 12	SIL; 2	FUJ; 3	SHA; 9	SEB; 3	**SPA**; 5	LMS; 3		4th	90

=== Complete World Touring Car Cup results ===
(key) (Races in bold indicate pole position) (Races in italics indicate fastest lap)

Year	Team	Car	1	2	3	4	5	6	7	8	9	10	11	12	13	14	15	16	17	18	19	20	21	22	23	24	25	26	27	28	29	30	DC	Pts
2019	Cyan Performance Lynk & Co	Lynk & Co 03 TCR	MAR; 1; 5	MAR; 2; 13	MAR; 3; 13	HUN; 1; 12	HUN; 2 Ret	HUN; 3; 20	SVK; 1; 21	SVK; 2; 18	SVK; 3; 22	NED; 1; 5	NED; 2; 18	NED; 3; 15	GER; 1; 22	GER; 2; 18	GER; 3; 19	POR; 1; 11	POR; 2; 15	POR; 3; 18	CHN; 1; 14	CHN; 2; 16†	CHN; 3; 11	JPN; 1; 25†	JPN; 2; 16	JPN; 3; 5	MAC; 1; 6	MAC; 2; 7	MAC; 3; 1	MAL; 1; 11	MAL; 2; 21	MAL; 3; 12	18th	122

^{†} Driver did not finish, but completed 90% of the race distance.

=== Complete British GT Championship results ===
(key) (Races in bold indicate pole position) (Races in italics indicate fastest lap)

Year	Team	Car	Class	1	2	3	4	5	6	7	8	9	DC	Points
2019	Multimatic Motorsports	Ford Mustang GT4	GT4	OUL; 1	OUL; 2	SNE; 1	SNE; 2	SIL; 1	DON; 1	SPA; 1; 27	BRH; 1	DON; 1	NC	0

=== Complete Bathurst 1000 results ===
Year	Team	Car	Co-driver	Position	Lap
2002	HSV Dealer Team	Holden Commodore VX	(France) Yvan Muller	DNF	122
2003	HSV Dealer Team	Holden Commodore VX	(Australia) Cameron McLean	DNF	33
2009	Walkinshaw Racing	Holden Commodore VE	(Australia) David Reynolds	12th	161
2013	Triple Eight Race Engineering	Holden Commodore VF	(Sweden) Mattias Ekström	10th	161

=== Complete 24 Hours of Le Mans results ===
Year	Team	Co-drivers	Car	Class	Laps	Pos.	Class pos.
2010	(Germany) BMW Motorsport	(Germany) Dirk Müller (Germany) Dirk Werner	BMW M3 GT2	GT2	53	DNF	DNF
2011	(Germany) BMW Motorsport	(Germany) Dirk Müller (United States) Joey Hand	BMW M3 GT2	GTE; Pro	313	15th	**3rd**
2016	(United States) Ford Chip Ganassi Team UK	(United Kingdom) Marino Franchitti (United Kingdom) Harry Tincknell	Ford GT	GTE; Pro	306	40th	9th
2017	(United States) Ford Chip Ganassi Team UK	(United Kingdom) Harry Tincknell (Brazil) Pipo Derani	Ford GT	GTE; Pro	340	18th	**2nd**
2018	(United States) Ford Chip Ganassi Team UK	(United Kingdom) Harry Tincknell (Brazil) Tony Kanaan	Ford GT	GTE; Pro	332	36th	12th
2019	(United States) Ford Chip Ganassi Team UK	(United States) Jonathan Bomarito (United Kingdom) Harry Tincknell	Ford GT	GTE; Pro	342	23rd	4th

Sporting positions
Preceded by David Grace	British Hill Climb Championship; Champion; 1995	Succeeded by Roy Lane
Preceded by Dan Eaves	Renault Spider Cup GB; Champion; 1999	Succeeded by Jim Edwards Jr. (Renault Clio Cup UK)
Preceded by Gabriele Tarquini	European Touring Car Championship; Champion; 2004	Succeeded by Richard Göransson (European Touring Car Cup)
Preceded by Roberto Ravaglia (1987)	World Touring Car Championship; Champion; 2005–2006–2007	Succeeded by Yvan Muller
Preceded by Duncan Huisman	Guia Race; Winner; 2006 Race 1	Succeeded by Jörg Müller
Preceded by Alain Menu	Guia Race; Winner; 2007 Race 2	Succeeded by Alain Menu
Preceded by Tom Kristensen; Petter Solberg	Race of Champions Nations' Cup; 2015; With: Jason Plato	Succeeded by Sebastian Vettel (2017)
Awards
Preceded by Richard Lyons	Autosport; British Club Driver of the Year; 1999	Succeeded by Michael Caine
Preceded by Jenson Button	Autosport; British Competition Driver of the Year; 2004	Succeeded by Dan Wheldon
