= David Coulthard =

Scottish racing driver (born 1971)

David Coulthard MBE
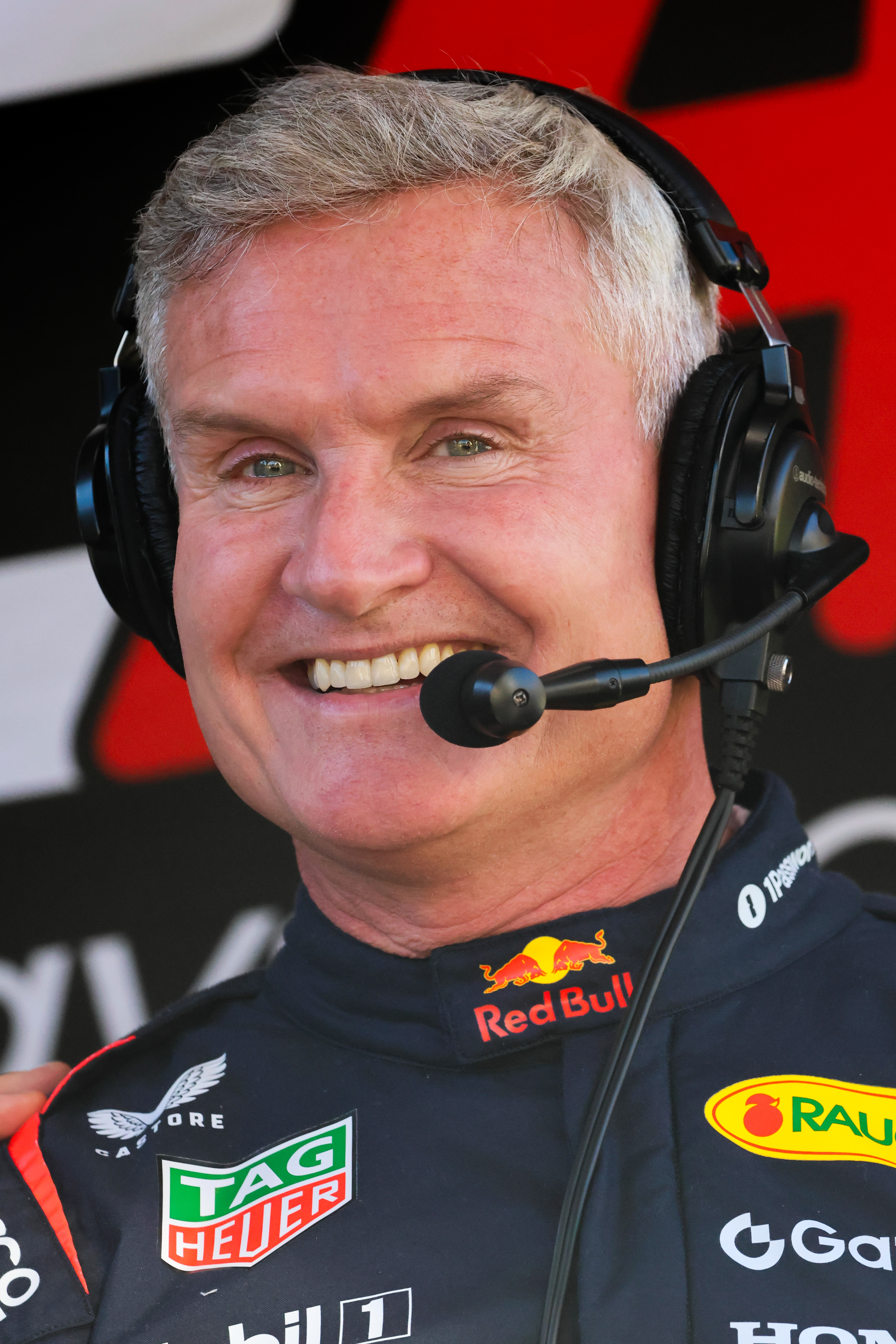
- Coulthard in 2025
- Born: David Marshall Coulthard; 27 March 1971 (age 55); Twynholm, Scotland
- Spouse(s): Karen Minier (m. 2013; div. 2022) Sigrid Silversand (m. 2026)
- Children: 1

Formula One World Championship career
- Nationality: (United Kingdom) British
- Active years: 1994–2008
- Team(s): Williams, McLaren, Red Bull
- Entries: 247 (246 starts)
- Championships: 0
- Wins: 13
- Podiums: 62
- Career points: 535
- Pole positions: 12
- Fastest laps: 18
- First entry: 1994 Spanish Grand Prix
- First win: 1995 Portuguese Grand Prix
- Last win: 2003 Australian Grand Prix
- Last entry: 2008 Brazilian Grand Prix

David Marshall Coulthard (born 27 March 1971) is a British former racing driver and broadcaster from Scotland who competed in Formula One from 1994 to 2008. Nicknamed "DC", Coulthard was runner-up in the Formula One World Drivers' Championship in 2001 with McLaren, and won 13 Grands Prix across 15 seasons.

Born and raised in Kirkcudbrightshire, Coulthard began karting at age 11 and achieved early success before progressing to car racing in the British Formula Ford Championship and the Formula 3000 series. He first drove in Formula One with Williams in the 1994 season succeeding the late Ayrton Senna. The following year he won his first Grand Prix in Portugal, and then for the 1996 season, he moved to McLaren. After winning two races in the 1997 season, he finished 3rd in the World Drivers' Championship in the 1998 season.

Coulthard won five races during 1999 and 2000 before finishing second in the Drivers' Championship to Michael Schumacher in 2001. Two more victories followed between 2002 and 2003 before he left McLaren at the end of 2004. He moved to Red Bull in 2005 and secured their first podium a year later. Coulthard retired from Formula One at the end of 2008, having achieved 13 wins, 12 pole positions, 18 fastest laps, and 62 podiums.

After retiring from Formula One, Coulthard continued working for Red Bull as a consultant and joined the BBC as a commentator and pundit for their coverage of Formula One. He returned to active motorsports in 2010 joining Mücke Motorsport in DTM and retired at the end of 2012. Coulthard has also participated in the Race of Champions, finishing runner-up in the Drivers' Cup in 2008, and winning the competition in 2014 and 2018.

Since 2016, he has worked as a commentator and analyst for Channel 4 after they took over the BBC's terrestrial television rights. In 2022, he joined the Nordic streaming service Viaplay. He appears during Formula One race weekends as a reporter and expert commentator alongside Mika Häkkinen and Tom Kristensen.

In 2019, Coulthard was elected president of the British Racing Drivers' Club (which owns the Silverstone Circuit).

== Early life and career ==
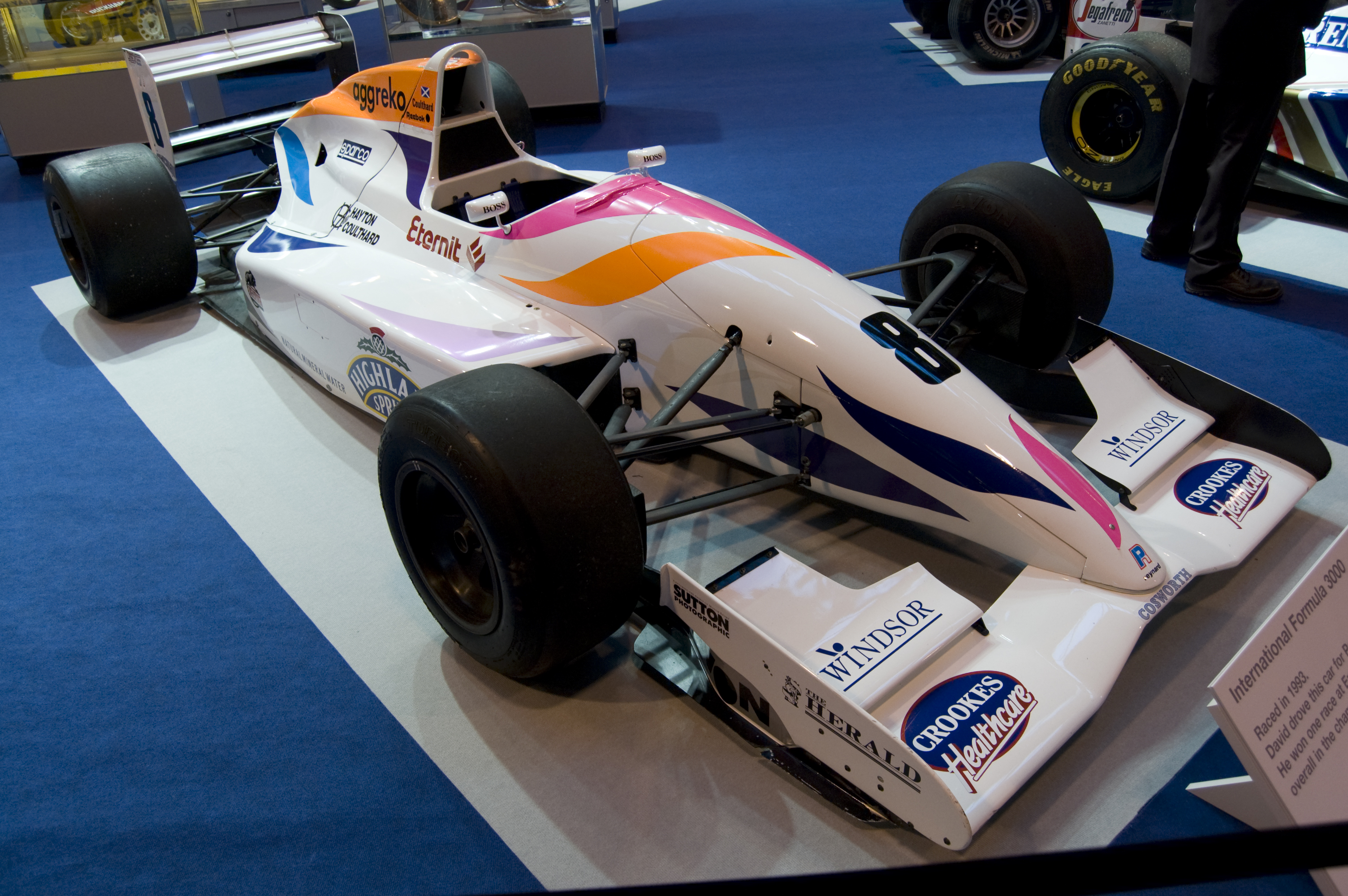
Coulthard's Formula 3000 car which he drove for Pacific Racing in the 1993 season

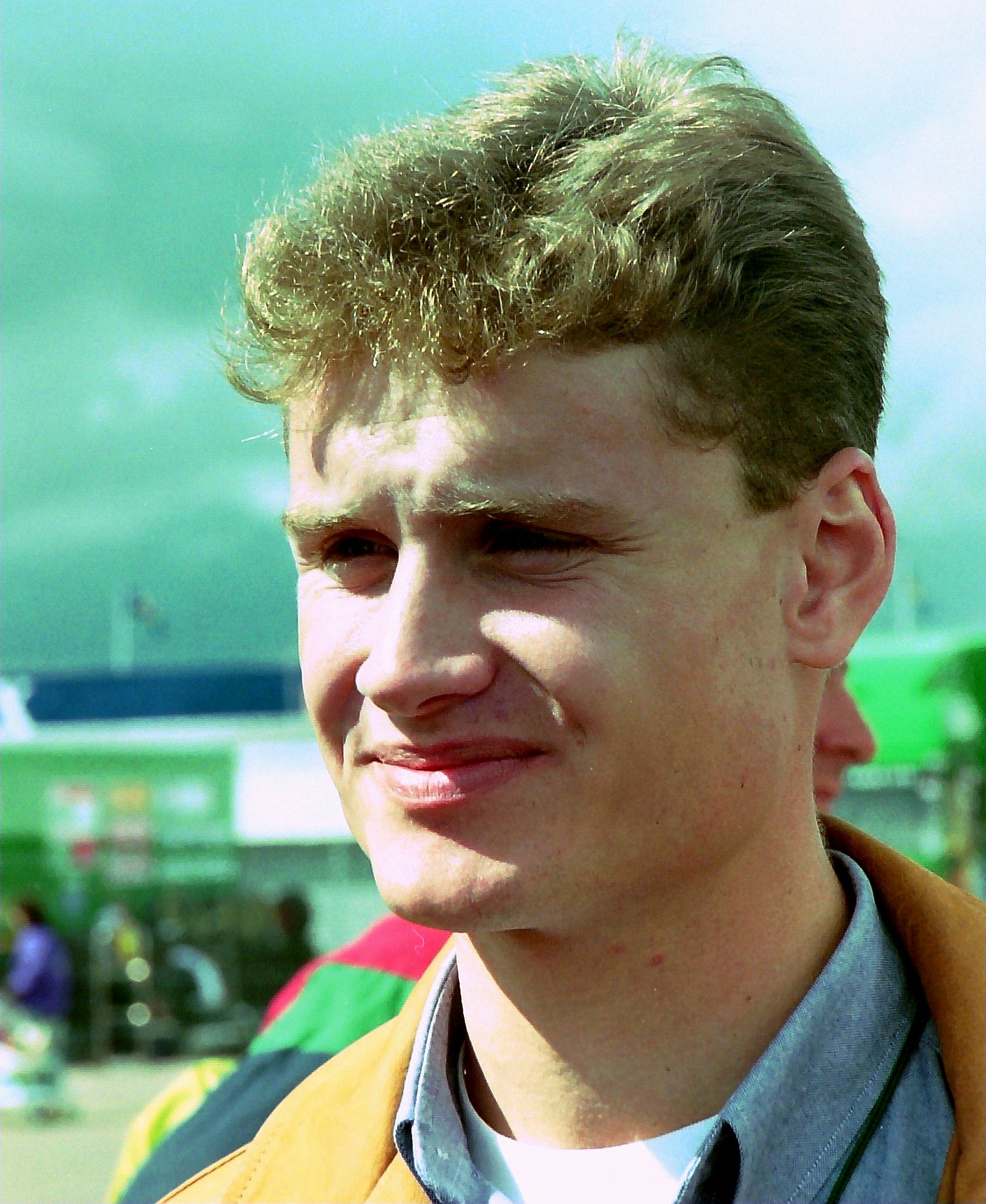
Coulthard in the paddock at the 1993 British Grand Prix as Williams test driver

Coulthard was born on 27 March 1971 in Twynholm, Kirkcudbrightshire, Scotland, one of three children to road haulier Duncan Coulthard and Elizabeth Joyce Coulthard née Marshall. His family was connected to motor racing: his grandfather competed in the Monte Carlo Rally and his father drove karts, becoming Scottish National Champion. From an early age, motorsport was where his interest lay, later listing Formula One World Champions Jim Clark, Nigel Mansell and Alain Prost as his childhood heroes. Coulthard was educated at Kirkcudbright Academy, achieving eight O-grades.

Coulthard began karting after his father presented him with his first kart for his eleventh birthday. Having won several local karting championships including the Scottish Junior Kart Championship and the Scottish Kart Championship, Coulthard participated in events further down the UK, including title victory in the Cumbria Kart Racing Club Championship in 1985. Coulthard graded each race he entered on a scale of 1 to 10, with an additional column headlined "Performance". He later gave credit to David Leslie, senior and junior, for allowing his career to develop.

In 1989, Coulthard made the transition from karting to car racing. It is often erroneously claimed that he won the British Formula Ford Championship that season, however, this is not the case. Coulthard actually won the lesser P&O Ferries Formula Ford 1600 Junior championship.

Coulthard became the first recipient of the McLaren/Autosport Young Driver of the Year award, which allowed him to test a McLaren Formula One car. In 1990, Coulthard travelled to Belgium to compete in the EFDA Nations Cup for Great Britain and was partnered with Nicky Hart, where they finished ninth. During the year, Coulthard was selected by Vauxhall Motorsport to race in a one-off appearance in the British Touring Car Championship (BTCC) at Brands Hatch, where he finished 13th (seventh in Class). At the time, he was the second youngest driver to race in the series, after Martin Brundle. He did not return to the series after suffering a leg injury in a Formula Vauxhall race at Spa-Francorchamps.

In 1991, Coulthard signed with Paul Stewart Racing to compete in the British Formula 3 series, taking five victories and finishing second in the Championship behind Rubens Barrichello. Coulthard won the Macau Grand Prix and the Masters of Formula Three. He later traveled to the Fuji Speedway to compete in the annual Formula Three Fuji Cup, taking pole position and finished second behind Jordi Gené.

In 1992, Coulthard moved to the International Formula 3000 series, where he suffered from a lack of competitiveness and finished ninth in the championship. For 1993, Coulthard joined Pacific Racing, taking one victory and finishing third in the series. He entered the 24 Hours of Le Mans alongside John Nielsen and David Brabham for the TWR Jaguar Racing team. The trio won the GT Class, although they were later disqualified for a technical infringement. He moved to the Vortex team in 1994, which received investment from a private investor, allowing Coulthard to drive for the team. In his first and only race for the team held at Silverstone, Coulthard finished third.

== Formula One career ==
=== Williams (1994–1995) ===
==== 1994 ====
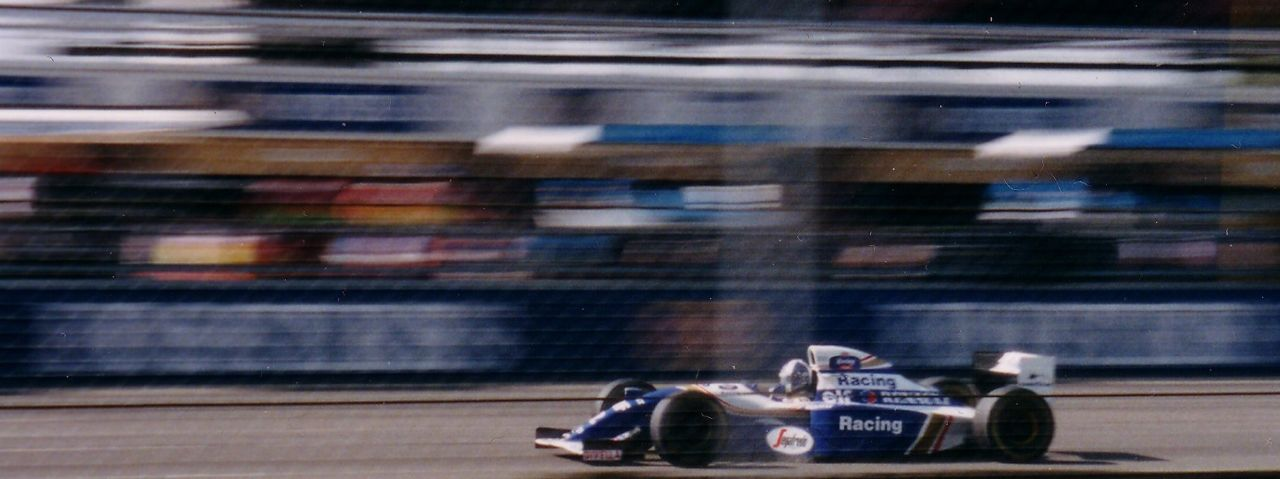
Coulthard at the 1994 British Grand Prix

Throughout 1993 and 1994, Coulthard was employed by the Williams team as their official test driver. Main driver Ayrton Senna was killed in the 1994 San Marino Grand Prix, meaning Williams would need a second driver. Coulthard received a telephone call from team principal Frank Williams to test the Williams car at Jerez circuit over four days, causing him to miss a Formula 3000 race at Pau.

Making his début in Spain, Coulthard qualified in eighth position, and was set to score a point before his engine failed 34 laps from the finish. He followed this up by scoring his first points with a fifth-place finish in Canada. Williams dropped Coulthard for the following race in France, allowing 1992 Drivers' Champion Nigel Mansell to make a one-off appearance due to pressure from engine supplier Renault. The move strained the relationship between Williams and Coulthard who returned for the British Grand Prix, finishing fifth.

For Germany, Williams introduced a revised version of their car, the Williams FW16B. He suffered back to back retirements in the next two races, but secured three consecutive points scoring positions—including a podium finish with a second-place in Portugal. Mansell later returned to fill Coulthard's seat for the final three races of the season. Coulthard finished the season in eighth place with Williams first in the Constructors' Championship. For his role, Coulthard was awarded BBC Young Sports Personality of the Year and received an award at the BBC Scottish Sports Personality of the Year.

In November, Coulthard became embroiled in a contract dispute. During the Australian Grand Prix, Coulthard chose to leave Williams and signed a contract with McLaren. Williams, however, insisted that they had the right to exercise their option to keep Coulthard, who was on a three-year contract with the team. Coulthard's management argued that the Williams option was not binding. The dispute went to Formula One's Contract Recognition Board, who ruled in favour of Williams on 14 December, forcing Coulthard to stay with the team.

==== 1995 ====
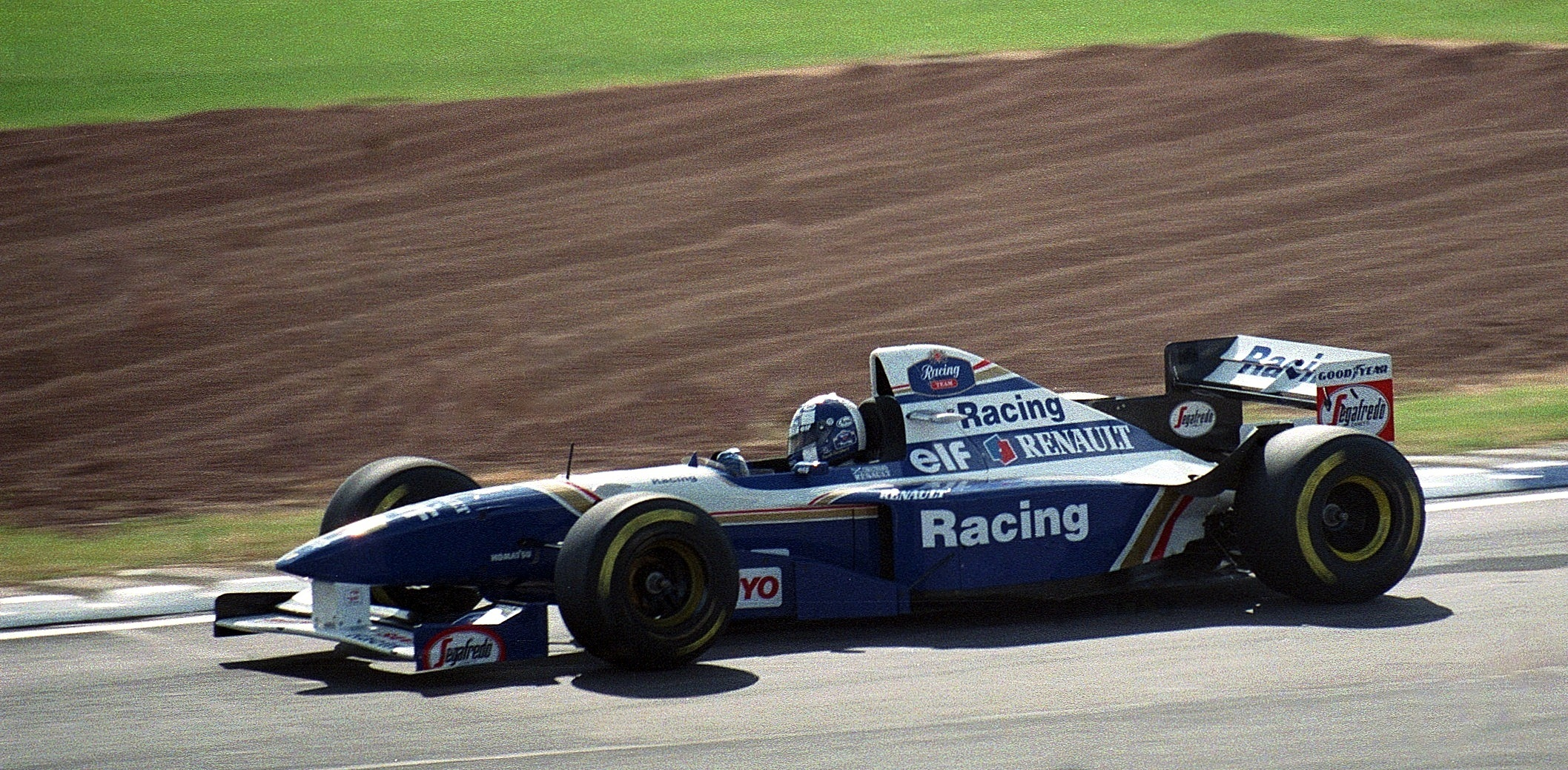
Coulthard at the 1995 British Grand Prix

In 1995, Coulthard again competed with Williams alongside Damon Hill. He was optimistic for the season, saying: "I'd like to think I can win a Grand Prix this year. That's really my aim, plus to score points in as many races as possible."

Coulthard's season started off with controversy when he and Benetton driver Michael Schumacher were disqualified for fuel irregularities in the first round in Brazil, where Coulthard finished second. On appeal, the original results of both drivers were reinstated. The next five races saw four retirements for Coulthard, plus a fourth-place finish in San Marino.

Despite his poor form in the early part of the season, Coulthard secured four consecutive podiums, with a further two consecutive retirements in Belgium and Italy. For Portugal, Williams introduced a revised version of their car, the Williams FW17B. Coulthard took pole position and led a majority of the race to take his first Formula One race victory. He took a further two podiums at the Nürburgring and Aida, retired in Suzuka, and crashed into the pit lane wall while leading in Adelaide. Coulthard finished the season third in the Drivers' Championship, helping Williams secure second place in the Constructors' Championship.

=== McLaren (1996–2004) ===
==== 1996 ====
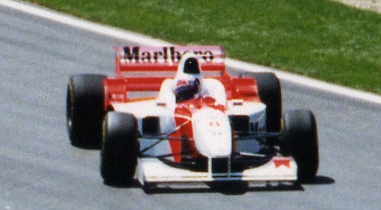
Coulthard at the 1996 San Marino Grand Prix

For 1996, Coulthard partnered with experienced driver Mika Häkkinen at McLaren, and believed there was a chance of winning races, though a challenge for the World Championship was unlikely until 1997 or 1998. His season started badly; he suffered a throttle issue in Australia, including a collision with Jordan driver Martin Brundle on the first lap. Coulthard spun off in Brazil and finished outside the points in Argentina. However, Coulthard secured a podium at the Nürburgring and led the race in San Marino before suffering a hydraulic failure.

Coulthard followed the result with a second-place finish in the wet race at Monaco before suffering a first-lap accident in the wet race in Spain. Before the Canadian Grand Prix, Coulthard signed an extension to his contract that would keep him at McLaren until 1998. Coulthard secured points finishing positions in the next four races, before suffering three consecutive retirements. He rounded these results by finishing outside the points-scoring positions in Portugal and Japan. Coulthard managed to secure seventh place in the Drivers' Championship.

==== 1997 ====
In 1997, Coulthard again partnered with Häkkinen at McLaren. He started his season by taking victory in the opening round in Australia. Coulthard was unable to score in the next four rounds, due to being involved in a collision in Argentina and contended with a car that was unreliable. The factor of unreliability had an impact throughout the season, which became notable in Canada, when Coulthard made a pit stop while leading and the car developed clutch problems. He suffered from four more retirements throughout the season; however, he was able to take victory at the Italian Grand Prix. He was able to secure two more podium positions in Austria and Jerez, where Coulthard conceded second place to teammate Häkkinen under team orders. Coulthard managed to finish in third place in the Drivers' Championship, tied on points with Benetton driver Jean Alesi.

==== 1998 ====
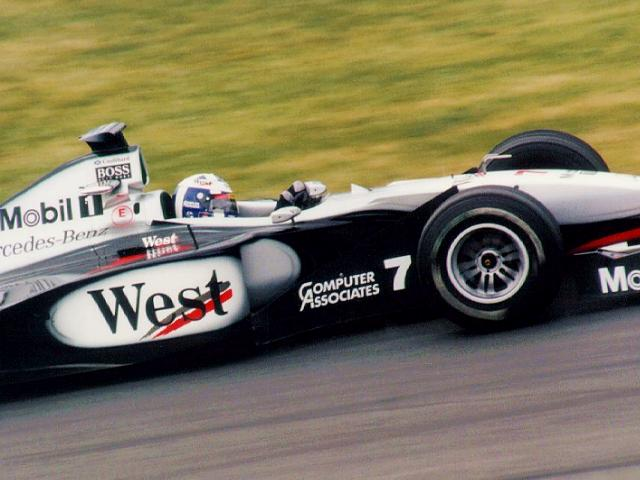
Coulthard at the 1998 Canadian Grand Prix

In 1998, Coulthard remained at McLaren and continued to partner with Häkkinen. The season started controversially in Australia for the McLaren team when Coulthard, who was leading, let Häkkinen past to win the race. Coulthard later revealed a pre-race agreement by the team that whoever led into the first corner on the first lap would be allowed to win the race. However, the race marked a run of consistent results, with Coulthard scoring three further podiums, including victory in San Marino. Coulthard retired from three out of the next four races, and followed this up by taking a further five podiums during the remainder of the season, including a retirement in Italy.

Coulthard's only finish outside the points-scoring positions was in Belgium, following a seventh-place finish. In wet conditions, Coulthard initially crashed out on the first lap, triggering an enormous multi-car collision. The race was restarted, and he was later involved in a controversial collision with Michael Schumacher when being lapped, leading to an angry confrontation in pit lane. Coulthard admitted five years later that the accident had been his mistake. Coulthard came in third in the Drivers' Championship, behind Schumacher and Häkkinen, and helped McLaren clinch the Constructors' Championship. Coulthard was awarded the Hawthorn Memorial Trophy, an annual award given to the most successful British or Commonwealth driver in Formula One over the course of one season.

==== 1999 ====
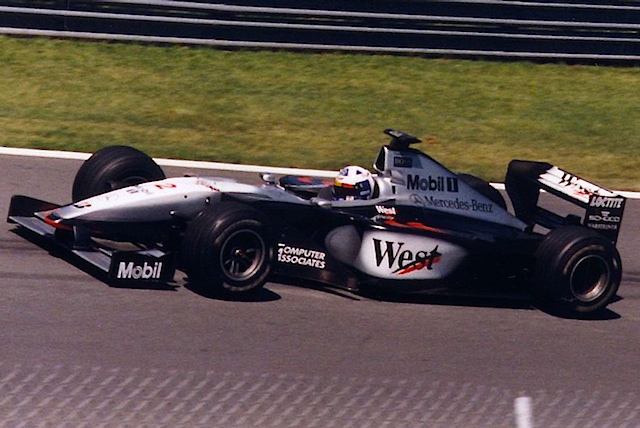
Coulthard at the 1999 Canadian Grand Prix

Coulthard stayed with McLaren, alongside Häkkinen, for 1999. His season got off with two consecutive retirements in Australia and Brazil caused by hydraulics and gearbox failures, respectively. Coulthard managed to clinch second place in San Marino before suffering from another gearbox issue at Monaco. He took his second podium of the year in Spain before Coulthard later finished outside the points-scoring positions in Canada and retired with electrical problems in France.

Coulthard managed to secure six consecutive finishes inside of the points, which included victories in Britain and Belgium and podium finishes in Austria and Hungary. His season was rounded by three consecutive retirements in the final rounds of the season. Overall, Coulthard finished in fourth place in the Drivers' Championship, six points behind Jordan driver Heinz-Harald Frentzen, and helped McLaren take second place in the Constructors' Championship.

==== 2000 ====
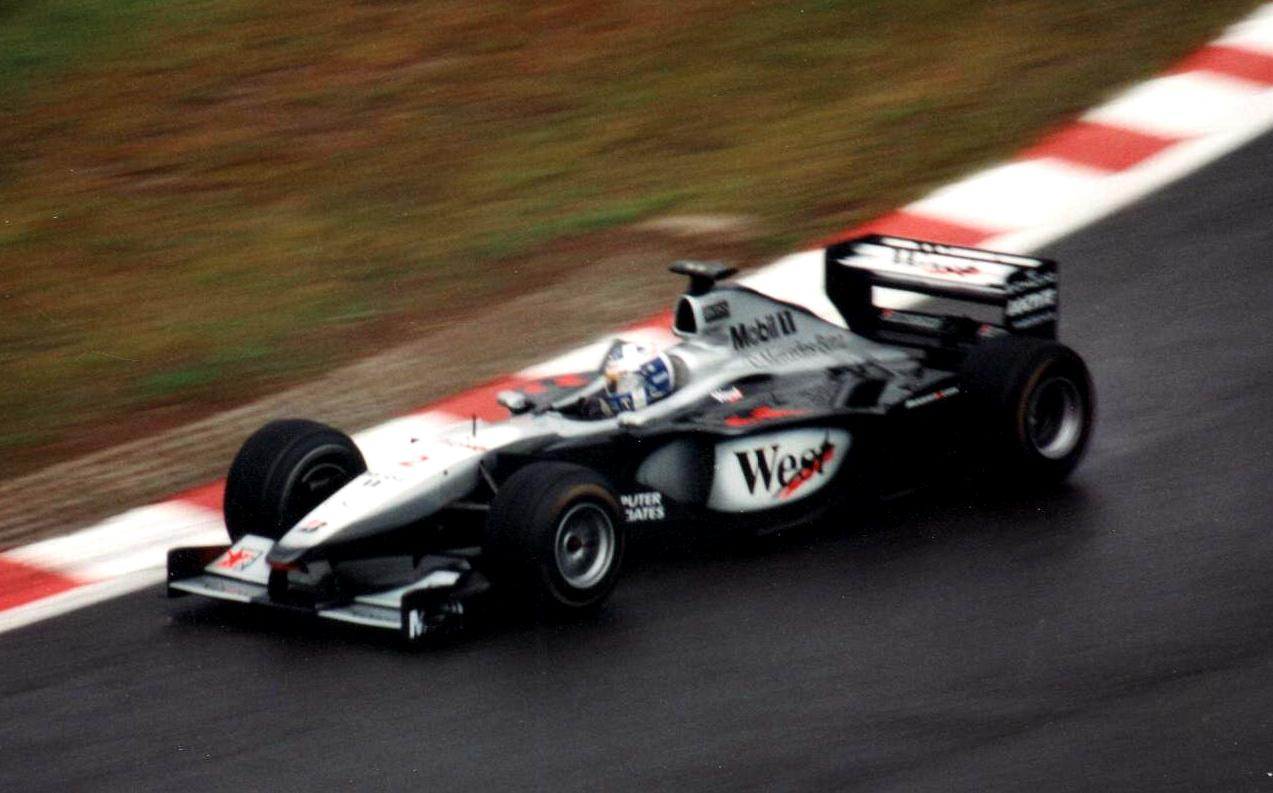
Coulthard at the 2000 Belgian Grand Prix

For 2000, Coulthard reorganised his schedule for the season, concentrating on his performances and spending less time working on promotional campaigns. Many motorsport critics labelled 2000 as Coulthard's "make or break" year.

The first rounds of the season proved difficult for Coulthard; In the opening round in Australia, he retired from engine problems, and finished second in Brazil, before being disqualified as the front wing endplates on his car 7mm lower than the required 50mm above the reference plane. Coulthard overcame these setbacks and finished on the podium in the next five races, which included victories in Britain and Monaco.

In June, Coulthard signed an extension to his contract, confirming he would remain at McLaren for 2001. A non-points scoring finish in Canada, followed victory in France, a victory which he later described as the most memorable of his career which also happened to be McLaren's only ever win at the Magny-Cours circuit. A hat-trick of podiums followed in the next three rounds and secured a fourth-place finish in Belgium. Coulthard was involved in a multi-car collision on the first lap in Italy. This would be marked by scoring points in the final three rounds, including podiums in Japan and Malaysia. Coulthard finished third in the Drivers' Championship, with 73 points, and McLaren finished second in the Constructors' Champions. For his efforts during the season, Coulthard was awarded his second Hawthorn Memorial Trophy.

==== 2001: Championship runner up ====
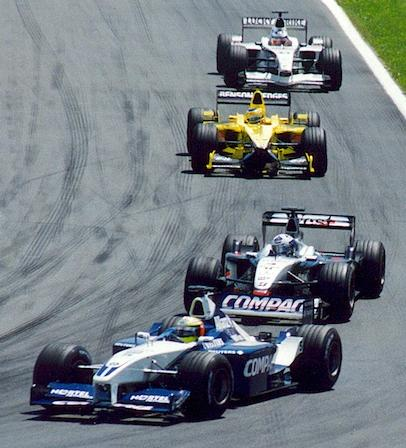
Coulthard following Ralf Schumacher at the 2001 Canadian Grand Prix

McLaren team principal Ron Dennis was ambitious about Coulthard's prospects for the new season, saying: "David is extremely fired up. He's strong and wants to test as much as possible. I honestly feel that David can win the world championship this year."

Coulthard performed well in the first seven races, scoring forty points, including victories in Brazil and Austria. In Canada, he suffered his first retirement of the season when his car developed engine problems while running in fourth position. Coulthard followed his non-finish with a podium at the Nürburgring and by finishing fourth in France.

The remaining seven races saw Coulthard retire on three more occasions and achieved four more podium positions—in Hungary, Belgium, the United States, and Japan. Overall, Coulthard secured a career best second place in the Drivers' Championship, 58 points behind World Champion Michael Schumacher. As a result, Coulthard was awarded with his second consecutive Hawthorn Memorial Trophy, and third overall (1998, 2000 and 2001).

==== 2002 ====
The 2002 season was the first in which Coulthard was the more experienced driver on his team. He was optimistic for the new season, saying: "If they need an opinion then they have to come to me this year. In the past they didn't. But that said, it's important for me not to get bogged down in the history of what happened in the past. We just have to go forward." He endured a torrid start: Coulthard's car suffered from gearbox issues and retired after 35 laps; and in the following race in Malaysia, both cars retired from engine failure after 24 laps. Two weeks later in the Brazilian Grand Prix, Coulthard secured his first podium of the season with a third-place finish. The start managed to get better as Coulthard took four consecutive finishes inside of the points; this included his only victory of the season in Monaco.

At the Canadian Grand Prix, Coulthard took his second consecutive podium by finishing second. He retired from the next race at the Nürburgring due to a collision with Williams driver Juan Pablo Montoya. This marked a turning point as Coulthard managed to finish five out of the next eight races in the points with a non-finish at the final round of the season in Japan. Coulthard finished the season fifth in the Drivers' Championship, with 41 points. Coulthard was awarded his third consecutive Hawthorn Memorial Trophy for his efforts during the 2002 season.

==== 2003 ====
Coulthard was again partnered at McLaren with Kimi Räikkönen for 2003. Former World Drivers' Champion Niki Lauda aired his doubts over Coulthard's ability to handle pressure from teammate Räikkönen over the coming season, saying: "Coulthard has the advantage of experience - as I did over Prost - but in qualifying Räikkönen has put him under a lot of pressure."

Coulthard began the season by taking victory in Australia and retired in Malaysia when his car developed an electrical problem. He managed to take back-to-back points in Brazil and San Marino as he was retired from a collision in Spain. In August, Coulthard signed an extension to his contract that would keep him at McLaren until 2004. Coulthard was able to secure two more podium positions in Germany and Japan. Coulthard finished seventh in the Drivers' Championship, scoring 51 points. After the season's conclusion, McLaren announced that Coulthard would be dropped at the end of 2004 and replaced by Juan Pablo Montoya. Coulthard earned his fourth consecutive Hawthorn Memorial Trophy for his efforts during the season.

==== 2004 ====
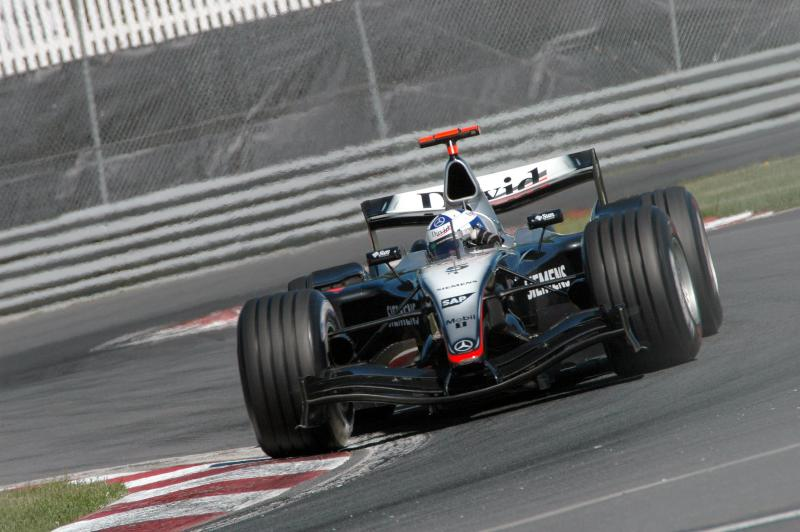
Coulthard at the 2004 Canadian Grand Prix

Coulthard went into the 2004 season with McLaren knowing he would lose his seat at the end of the year. However, he insisted he had his team's backing, and pledged that his approach for 2004 would be more aggressive. He endured a consistent start: Coulthard secured two consecutive points finishes in the opening two races in Australia and Malaysia, despite being off the pace.

During the race in Bahrain, both McLaren drivers were forced into retirement due to engine failures after fifty laps. Coulthard did not score in the next four races, which included consecutive retirements in Monaco and at the Nürburgring. He was able to take points scoring positions at the next two races in Canada and the United States.

McLaren introduced a revised version of their car the McLaren MP4-19B in France. The change of car improved reliability and results, helping Coulthard to achieve sixth place during the Grand Prix, and secured further points in four more races over the course of the season, only suffering from one further non-finish from a collision with Ferrari driver Rubens Barrichello in Japan. Overall, Coulthard finished tenth in the Drivers' Championship, equal on points with Ralf Schumacher, and did not score any podium finishes during the season.

=== Red Bull (2005–2008) ===
==== 2005 ====
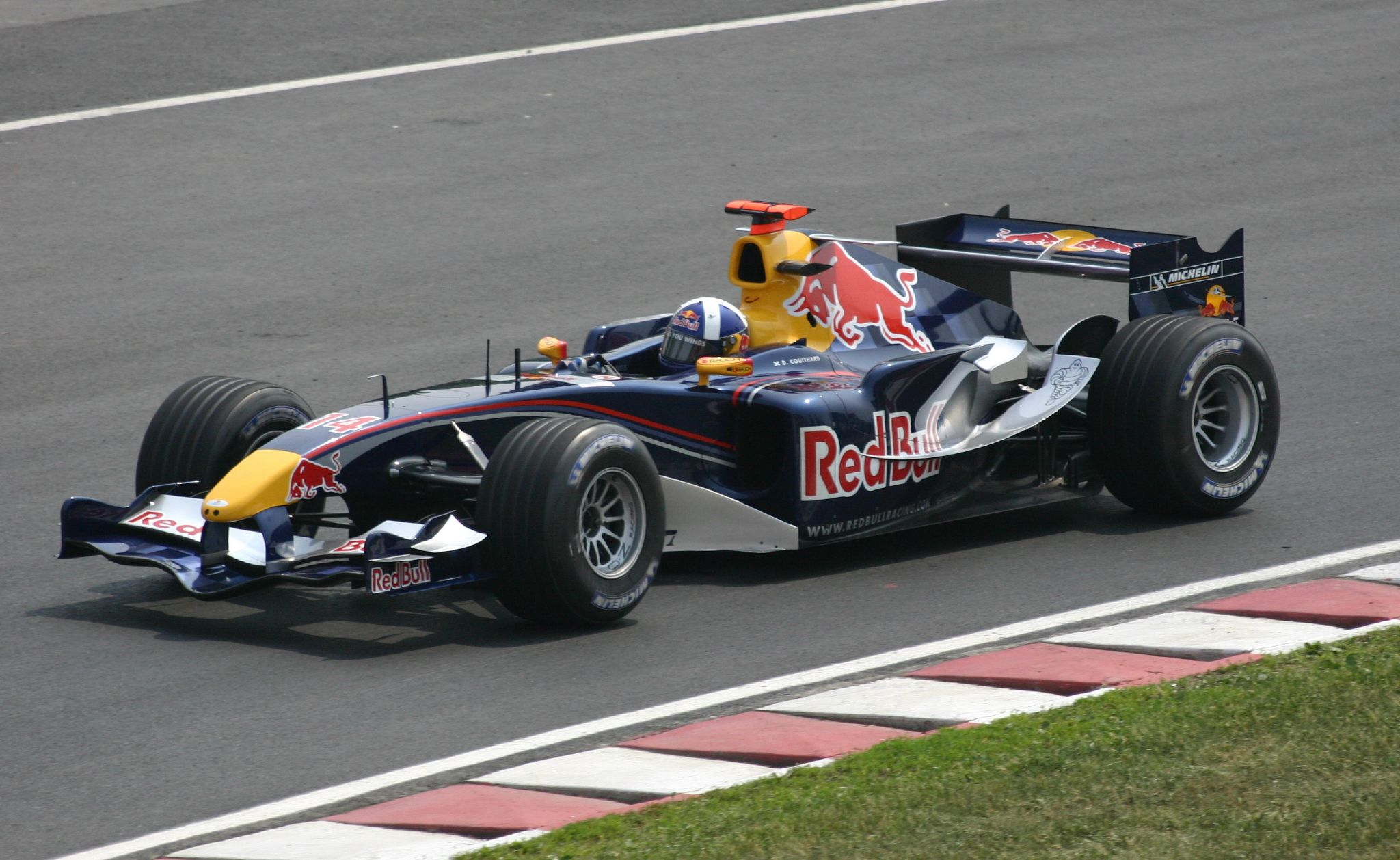
Coulthard at the 2005 Canadian Grand Prix

Following the purchase of the Jaguar team by Red Bull, Coulthard announced on 17 December 2004 that he would move to Red Bull for the 2005 season. He signed a one-year deal for a reported £1.8 million to drive alongside Austrian driver Christian Klien. Coulthard was offered a testing role at Ferrari, which he declined as he decided to remain in a race seat.

Coulthard began the season by scoring points in four of the first five races. Before the San Marino Grand Prix, Klien was replaced by Red Bull test driver Vitantonio Liuzzi who partnered Coulthard for the next four races. The forced withdrawal of all teams using Michelin tyres, including Red Bull, at the controversial United States Grand Prix, meant Coulthard did not start a race for the first time in his career. In July, it was announced that Coulthard would remain at Red Bull for 2006. This marked a turning point in his season as Coulthard did not score points in six of the nine remaining races. He achieved points three times during this period—in Germany, Turkey and Japan. He finished the season in twelfth place with Red Bull seventh in the Constructors' Championship.

==== 2006 ====
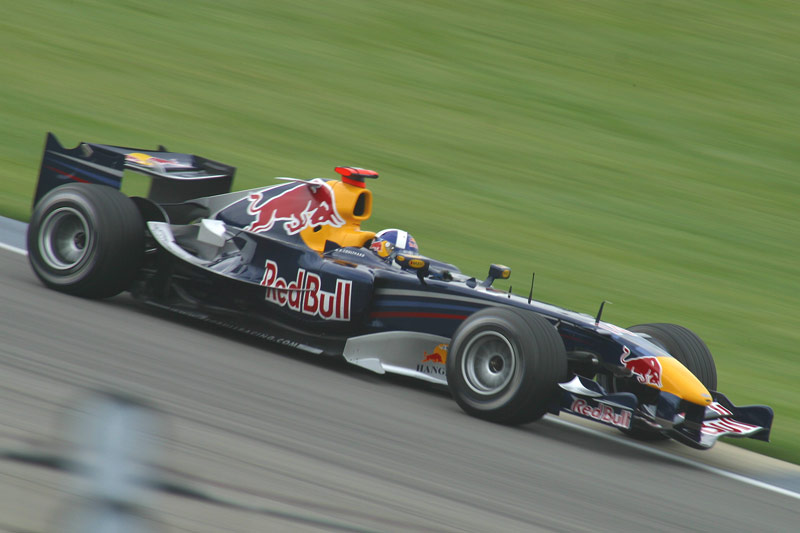
Coulthard at the 2006 United States Grand Prix

Coulthard stayed with Red Bull in 2006, and continued to be partnered by Klien. Coulthard started his season by scoring one point in the first six races and retired three times. Coulthard secured Red Bull Racing's first podium position by finishing 3rd in Monaco. He managed to finish in the next ten races he entered which included finishing in the points in Canada, the United States and Hungary.

In August, it was announced that Coulthard had extended his contract with Red Bull for 2007 and would be partnered by Williams driver Mark Webber. Before the Chinese Grand Prix, Klien lost his seat at Red Bull, so Coulthard was partnered with Robert Doornbos. Coulthard finished the season by finishing 13th in the Drivers' Championship, with 14 points.

==== 2007 ====
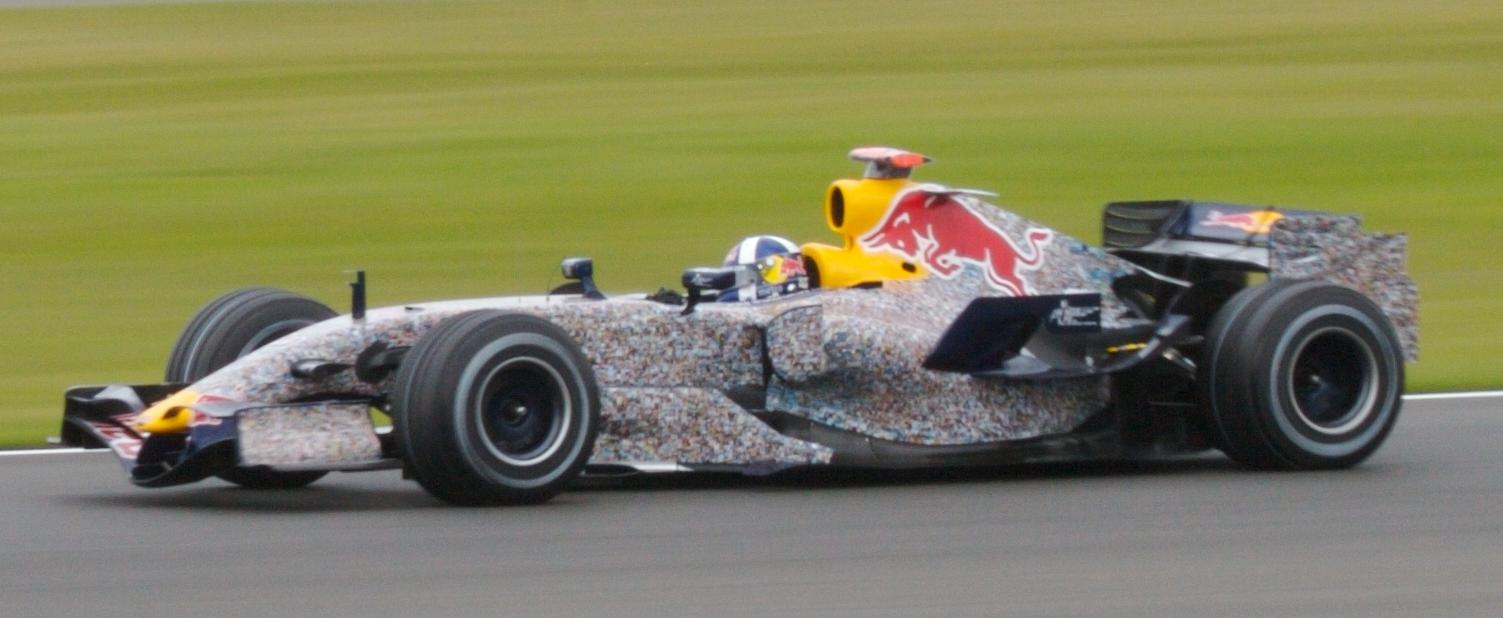
Coulthard at the 2007 British Grand Prix

Coulthard continued as a driver at Red Bull in 2007, partnered by Webber. He endured a torrid start in the first three races due to reliability problems and an accident. He was able to score his first points of the season by taking fifth position in Spain. Coulthard finished outside the points, with consecutive retirements in Canada and the United States, before he secured fifth position in the European Grand Prix. In July, it was announced that Coulthard would remain with Red Bull in 2008. Coulthard secured tenth position in the Drivers' Championship, with 14 points.

==== 2008: Final F1 season ====
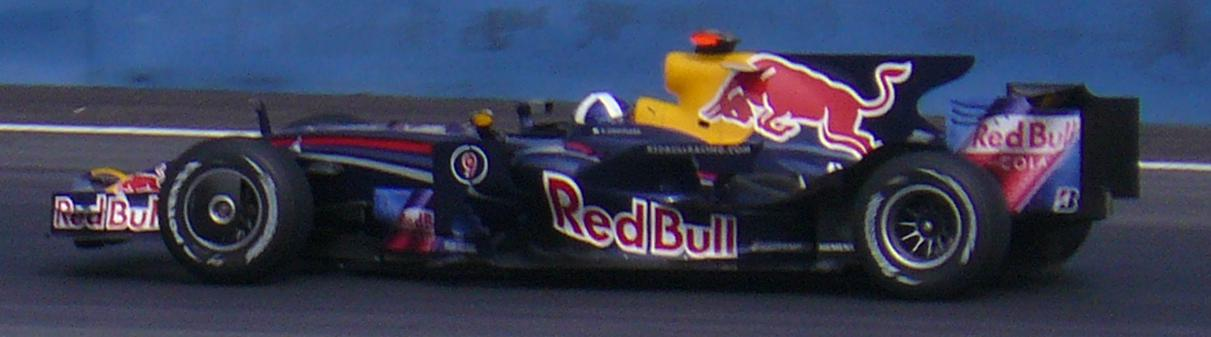
Coulthard at the 2008 European Grand Prix

Coulthard started the season with a retirement after colliding with Ferrari driver Felipe Massa. In Malaysia Coulthard suffered from a suspension failure on his car during practice which resulted in Red Bull placed under investigation for car safety. Coulthard was later cleared to race, and managed to secure ninth. He was unable to score points until Canada, when he finished on the podium in third. Before the British Grand Prix, where he retired on the first lap when he was hit by Toro Rosso driver Sebastian Vettel, Coulthard announced that he would retire from Formula One at the end of the season, though he would remain at Red Bull as a testing and development consultant.

Over the next five races, Coulthard was able to finish albeit outside the points-scoring positions. He took the final points of his career with seventh place in Singapore. In his final race in Brazil, Coulthard's Red Bull RB4 was decorated in the colours of "Wings for Life", a charity dedicated to raising awareness of spinal cord injuries. He was unable to finish the race, when his car was hit by Williams driver Nico Rosberg and Coulthard's car was sent into the path of Rosberg's teammate Kazuki Nakajima.

== Race of Champions (2004–2009, 2011–present) ==
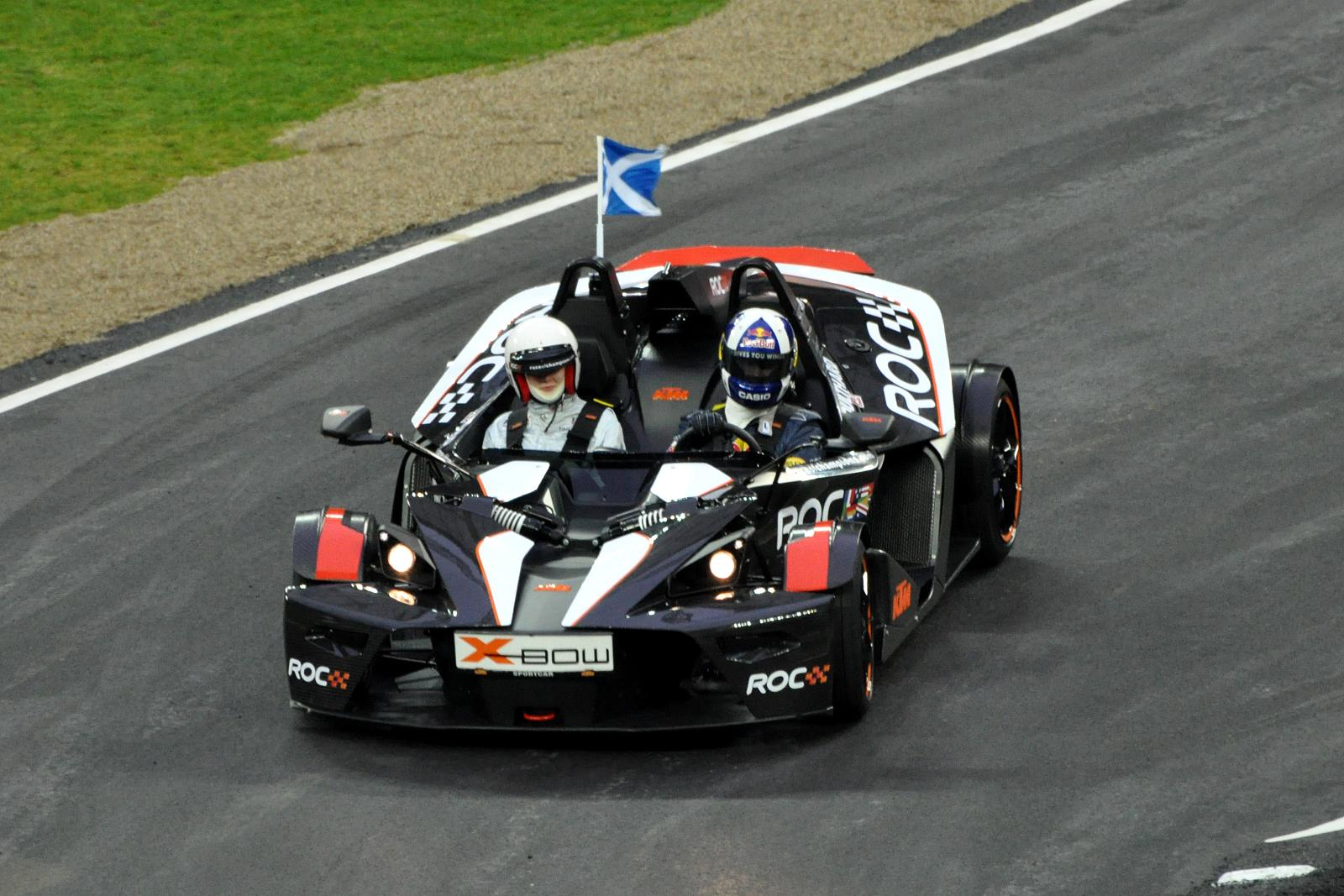
Coulthard driving in the 2008 Race of Champions, where he finished as runner-up in the Drivers' Cup

On 4 December 2004, Coulthard participated in his first Race of Champions for Great Britain alongside 1995 World Rally Champion Colin McRae. Coulthard was eliminated in the quarter-finals of the racing group having taken a time penalty, losing to Heikki Kovalainen. Coulthard and McRae were again chosen to compete in 2005, when the event was held in Stade de France. Coulthard was eliminated in the first round by Tom Kristensen and Great Britain were defeated by France in the semi-finals of the Nations Cup. In 2006, Coulthard was eliminated in the quarter-finals stage by Yvan Muller.

For 2007, Alister McRae partnered Coulthard after Colin McRae was killed in a helicopter crash. For the second consecutive year, Coulthard was eliminated at the quarter-final stage, this time by Sébastien Bourdais. On 30 October 2008, Coulthard was announced as one of the competitors of the event in 2008 for F1 Racing Great Britain, held at Wembley Stadium on 14 December. He reached the final of the Drivers' Cup and lost out to World Rally Champion Sébastien Loeb. In 2009, Coulthard raced for the All-Stars team alongside Giniel de Villiers. The pair were eliminated in Group B of the Nations Cup, and Coulthard was defeated in the quarter-finals of the World Finals by Sebastian Vettel.

Coulthard did not participate in 2010 and was replaced by BTCC driver Jason Plato. Coulthard returned for 2011, joining the All-Stars team alongside Filipe Albuquerque. Neither driver achieved success at the competition. In 2012, Coulthard remained in the Race of Champions and returned to compete for Great Britain, partnering Andy Priaulx. The pairing were eliminated in the group stages, with Coulthard being eliminated during the semi-finals by Kristensen in the Drivers' Cup.

For 2013, Coulthard was to be partnered by Williams development driver Susie Wolff, the first female competitor in the history of the Race of Champions. However, two weeks before the event was due to take place in Bangkok, the Sports Authority of Thailand and Race of Champions organisers announced the event would be cancelled due to political unrest in Thailand. For 2014, Coulthard went onto the Nation's Cup with Wolff and the pair reached the final, finishing runner-up to Team Nordic's Tom Kristensen and Petter Solberg. Coulthard then went on to win the Driver's Cup after beating Pascal Wehrlein in the final to claim his first Race of Champions Driver's title. He went on to beat Solberg to win the 2018 Race of Champions.

== Later career ==
=== Media ===
On 25 November 2008, it was announced that Coulthard would join the BBC as a pundit alongside Jake Humphrey and Eddie Jordan for the broadcaster's coverage of Formula One. With the departure of commentator Jonathan Legard at the end of 2010, Coulthard was announced as a co-commentator alongside Brundle, after undergoing successful screen tests. He also writes a regular column for The Daily Telegraph and BBC Sport.

In 2016, Coulthard left the BBC to join Channel 4 after the BBC abandoned its coverage of Formula One. With Channel 4 he continued to commentate and be a co-presenter of their Formula One coverage. Coulthard co-owns Whisper Films, along with former co-presenter Jake Humphrey, and the production company was chosen by Channel 4 to produce its coverage of all of its races. He was offered a presenting role on Top Gear alongside Jordan but turned down the offer because "Channel 4 pulled a blinder".

For the 2017 Mexico City ePrix he made a guest appearance as an analyst for Channel 5 coverage. On 10 October 2018, Coulthard was announced as a spokesperson and advisory board member of the forthcoming W Series, a racing championship for women based on Formula 3-homologated Tatuus T-318 chassis. He was also a co-commentator for W Series.

In 2023 he launched a podcast, called Formula For Success, with his BBC and Channel 4 co-presenter Eddie Jordan. The podcasts featured a mix of reactions to current affairs in Formula 1 as well as reminiscing on the past, often with guests from F1's history. Following the announcement of the death of Eddie Jordan on 20 March 2025, the future of the podcast appears unclear.

=== Ambassadorship ===
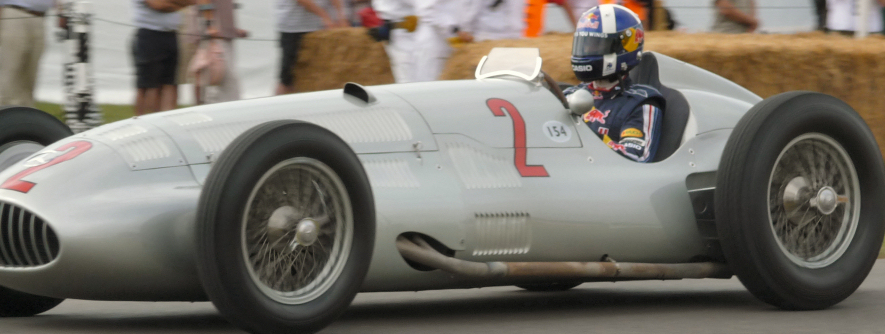
Coulthard demonstrating a Mercedes-Benz W154 at the 2009 Goodwood Festival of Speed

Following his retirement from Formula 1 with Red Bull in 2008, Coulthard remained contracted with the company as a brand ambassador frequently performing demonstration runs of various Formula 1 cars as part of fan events and promotional materials, including the Goodwood Festival of Speed. Coulthard also works as an ambassador for Red Bull's spinal injuries charity Wings For Life, as well as the Swiss watch manufacturer IWC Schaffhausen, the Swiss investment bank UBS and the transportation interior designers Transcal.

=== Deutsche Tourenwagen Masters (2010–12) ===
==== 2010 ====
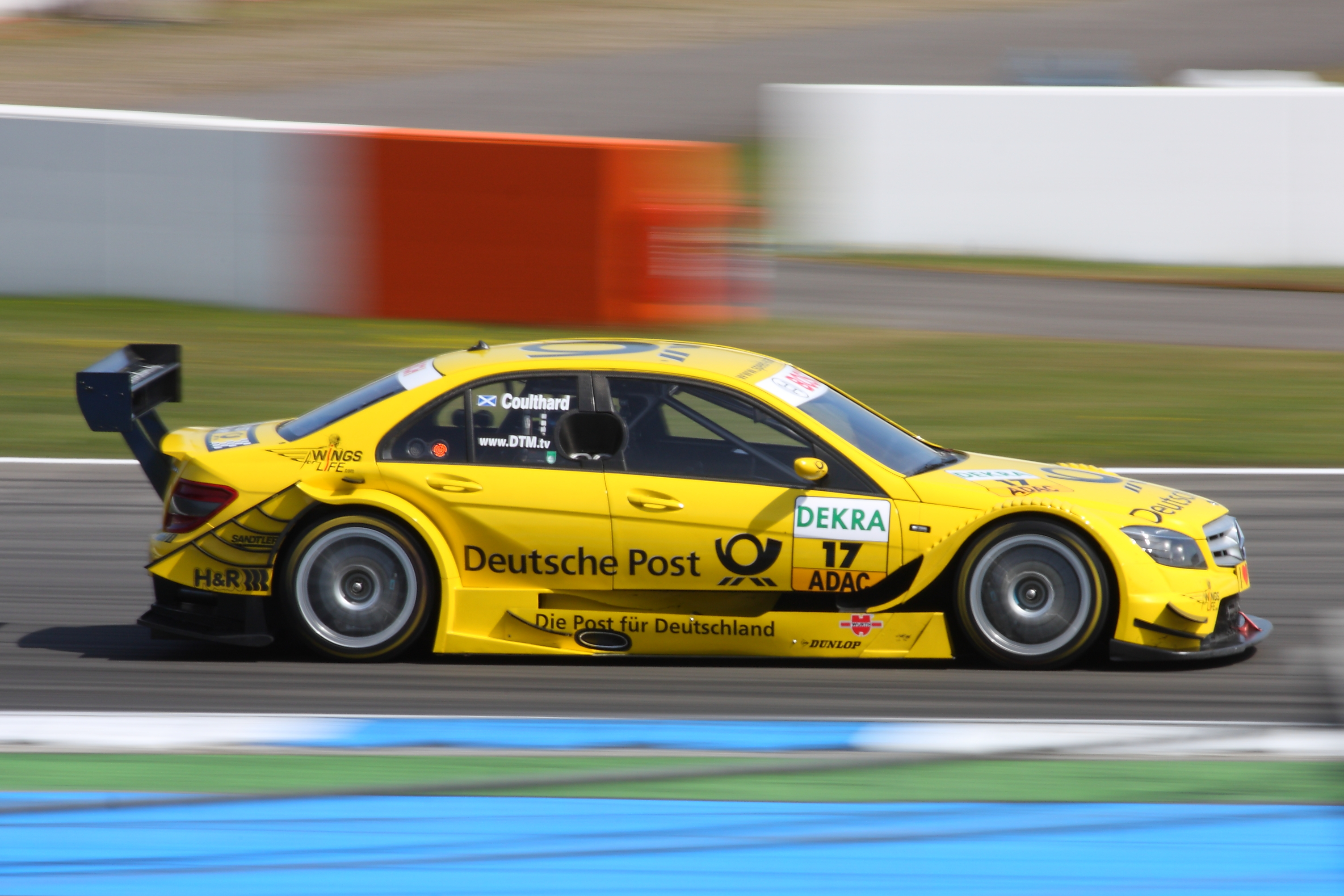
Coulthard driving in DTM at Hockenheim in 2010

On 4 April 2010, Coulthard announced a return to motor racing when he secured a contract to drive for Mücke Motorsport and would be partnered by Maro Engel. Coulthard started the season by finishing in the first two races and retired from a collision in Lausitz. He managed to secure a further five consecutive finishes, although he did not score points in these races. Coulthard retired on the first lap of the next race at the Hockenheimring when he was involved in a multi-car collision. Coulthard rounded out the season with an eighth-place finish in Shanghai. Coulthard finished 16th in the Drivers' Championship, with one point.

==== 2011 ====
On 6 April 2011, it was announced that Coulthard would be retained by Mücke and would once again be partnered by Engel. Coulthard stated at 2010 was his "apprenticeship year" and pledged during 2011, that he would become more competitive. Coulthard started off his season by finishing in the first four races, albeit outside the points-scoring positions. He secured his only points of the year at the fifth race of the season at the Norisring, where he finished eighth. The remainder of the season saw Coulthard finish every race, although he was disqualified from the race at Ricardo Tormo as his car's rear wing was found to have been incorrectly mounted during the qualifying session. For the second consecutive year, Coulthard finished 16th in the Drivers' Championship, with one point.

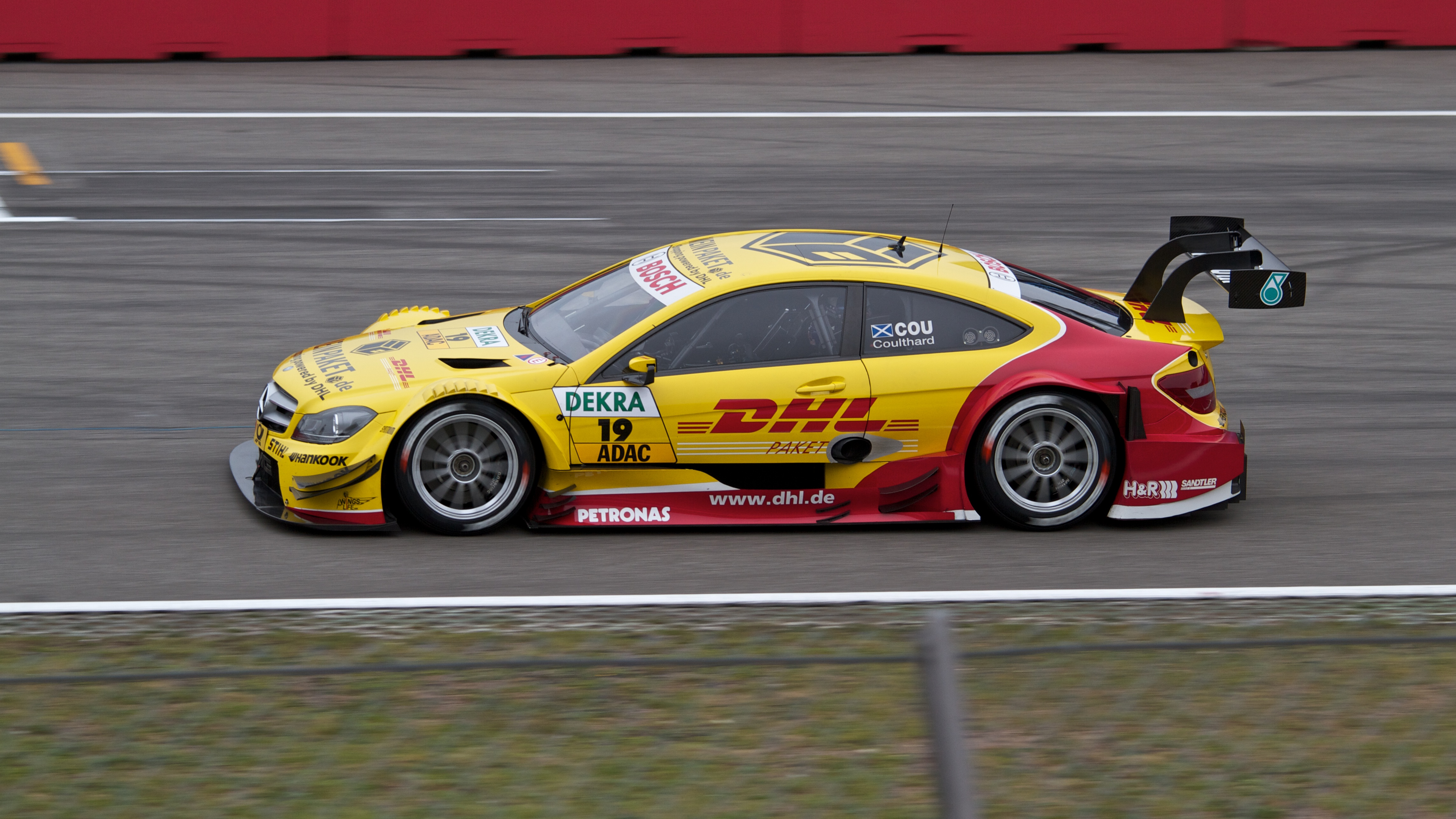
Coulthard competing at Hockenheim during the 2012 DTM season

==== 2012 ====
On 29 February 2012, it was announced that Coulthard would once again be retained by Mücke and would be partnered by Robert Wickens. Coulthard finished in the points with eighth position in the opening round held at the Hockenheimring. He did not score points in the next three races, which included a retirement at the Red Bull Ring. He recovered from this to take fifth position in the next round at the Norisring. Before the final race at the Hockenheim, Coulthard announced his retirement from motor racing, citing the reason to spend more time with his family and to concentrate on his co-commentary role with the BBC, as well as managing his off-track businesses. Overall, Coulthard secured fifteenth in the Drivers' Championship, with 14 points.

== Driving style ==
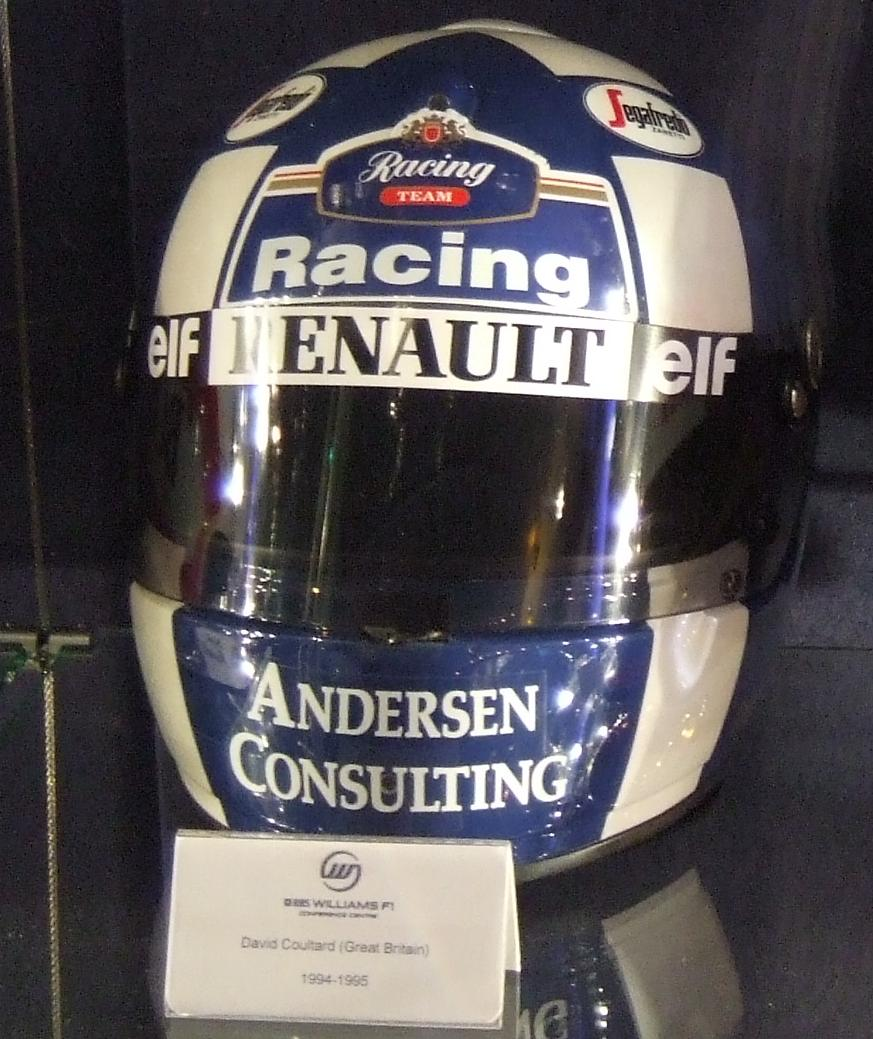
Coulthard's helmet when driving for Williams

Coulthard became known for having a smooth driving style. This style allowed him to perform at circuits where chicanes are common. However, this also meant that he was not suited to modern-day circuit configurations where a majority of the corners are taken at a medium-speed.

During his Formula Ford career, Coulthard gained a reputation of performing better at races than during qualifying sessions. The problem became particularly prevalent during 2003, when one-lap qualifying was introduced, in an effort for smaller teams to gain more television exposure. Coulthard became an open vocal opponent of the format, saying: "I just don't like the single-lap qualifying format, I don't think it's right that one lap judges whether you are fast or not."

== Helmet design ==
Coulthard's helmet design is blue and consists of a white saltire on the top which resembles the flag of Scotland and the four tips are trespassed from the top of the chin area. Coulthard borrowed a helmet belonging to Michael Schumacher for the 1996 Monaco Grand Prix as his regular helmet was suffering from steaming up during the weekend. Upon Schumacher's first retirement in 2006, he suggested to Coulthard that he would swap one of his own helmets for one of Coulthard's, which was agreed by Coulthard. For the 2007 Japanese Grand Prix, he changed his design to grey with a stylised saltire on the sides of his helmet, as an homage to the late World Rally Champion Colin McRae.

== Personal life ==
Coulthard has lived for some time in Monaco, and also owns homes in London, Belgium and Switzerland. He owns several luxury hotels in Britain and is a former owner of the Columbus Hotel Monaco, which is located in Monaco's Fontvieille.

On 2 May 2000, while he was leasing the Learjet of friend David Murray, the aeroplane developed engine trouble en route to Côte d'Azur International Airport in Nice and crashed while attempting an emergency landing at Lyon-Satolas Airport, France. Coulthard, his then-fiancée the American model Heidi Wichlinski and personal trainer/bodyguard Andy Matthews survived; Murray's personal pilot David Saunders and co-pilot Dan Worley died. Coulthard and Wichlinski ended their engagement before the beginning of the 2001 season, which was followed with a series of newspaper reports about alleged affairs with other women.

Coulthard was involved in a four-year relationship with Brazilian model Simone Abdelnour, before ending the relationship in 2005. Coulthard became engaged to Karen Minier, a Belgian Formula One correspondent for French TV channel TF1, on 2 June 2006. The couple married in 2013. Coulthard and Minier had their child on 20 November 2008. Coulthard and Minier divorced in 2022. In January 2025, Coulthard became engaged to Swedish model Sigrid Silversand after two years of dating. On 11 July 2026, Coulthard and Silversand celebrated their wedding at his family estate in Scotland, hosting a large party attended by guests from the worlds of show business and motorsport. For the occasion, Silversand wore a bespoke Francesca Piccini Bridal gown in pure silk gazar with delicate hand embroidery on the dress and veil, inspired by white heather, a flower regarded in Scotland as a traditional symbol of good luck for brides.

A museum in his home village, Twynholm, was dedicated to Coulthard, but it has now closed. It was previously run by Coulthard's sister Lynsay who died of an overdose of propranolol in February 2013. His half sister Elaine had died in her sleep in 2011. Fans in his home village are called "Twynosi" (a cross between Twynholm and the Italian word for "fans", tifosi, as used by Ferrari fans), who gather on race days. In his autobiography, he stated that he had suffered from bulimia as a teenager, caused by the need to lose weight when competing in karting championships. In 2008, Coulthard was best man at the wedding of Christian Hughes and actress/presenter Amanda Holden.

Coulthard's second cousin, New Zealander Fabian Coulthard, is also a racing driver, and has won several junior championships. He is currently racing in the Australian V8 Supercar Championship Series for Team Sydney. His son, Dayton, is also a racing driver and made his junior formulae debut in the 2025 GB4 Championship.

Coulthard is an ambassador for the spinal injuries charity Wings For Life.

He was appointed Member of the Order of the British Empire (MBE) in the 2010 Birthday Honours for services to motorsport.

Coulthard is a Mercedes-Benz Brand Ambassador and was involved with the development of the Mercedes-Benz SLS AMG.

In 2018, Coulthard along with George Glasgow Jr, the CEO of George Cleverley Shoes, and Sam Tidswell-Norrish, a founder member of private equity firm, Motive Partners, took over a pub in Barnes in south-west London, The Brown Dog.

== Racing record ==
=== Career summary ===
Season	Series	Team	Races	Poles	Wins	F/Laps	Podiums	Points	Position
1989	Formula Ford 1600 Dunlop/Autosport	?	12	?	?	?	?	131	**1st**
1989	Formula Ford 1600 P&O Ferries Junior	Eternit	14	?	?	?	?	? (67)	**1st**
1989	Formula Ford Festival	David Leslie Racing	1	0	0	0	1	N/A	**3rd**
1990	Formula Opel Lotus Euroseries	Paul Stewart Racing	11	0	1	0	2	74	5th
1990	Formula Vauxhall Lotus	Paul Stewart Racing	12	?	2	?	?	80	4th
1990	British Touring Car Championship	Vauxhall Motorsport	1	0	0	0	0	4	33rd
1991	British Formula 3 Championship	Paul Stewart Racing	16	0	5	0	8	66	**2nd**
1991	Macau Grand Prix	Paul Stewart Racing	1	0	1	0	1	N/A	**1st**
1991	Masters of Formula 3	Paul Stewart Racing	1	0	1	0	1	N/A	**1st**
1991	Formula Three Fuji Cup	?	1	1	0	0	1	N/A	**2nd**
1992	International Formula 3000	Paul Stewart Racing	10	0	0	1	2	11	9th
1992	Macau Grand Prix	Paul Stewart Racing	1	0	0	0	0	N/A	NC
1993	International Formula 3000	Pacific Racing	9	0	1	2	4	25	**3rd**
1993	Formula One	Canon Williams Renault	Test driver						
1993	24 Hours of Le Mans - GT Class	TWR Jaguar Racing	1	0	0	0	0	N/A	DSQ
1994	International Formula 3000	Vortex Motorsport	1	0	0	0	1	6	9th
1994	Formula One	Rothmans Williams Renault	Test driver						
1994	Formula One	Rothmans Williams Renault	8	0	0	2	1	14	8th
1995	Formula One	Rothmans Williams Renault	17	5	1	2	8	49	**3rd**
1996	Formula One	Marlboro McLaren Mercedes	16	0	0	0	2	18	7th
1997	Formula One	West McLaren Mercedes	17	0	2	1	4	36	**3rd**
1998	Formula One	West McLaren Mercedes	16	3	1	3	9	56	**3rd**
1999	Formula One	West McLaren Mercedes	16	0	2	3	6	48	4th
2000	Formula One	West McLaren Mercedes	17	2	3	3	11	73	**3rd**
2001	Formula One	West McLaren Mercedes	17	2	2	3	10	65	**2nd**
2002	Formula One	West McLaren Mercedes	17	0	1	1	6	41	5th
2003	Formula One	West McLaren Mercedes	16	1	1	0	3	51	7th
2004	Formula One	West McLaren Mercedes	18	0	0	0	0	24	10th
2005	Formula One	Red Bull Racing	19	0	0	0	0	24	12th
2006	Formula One	Red Bull Racing	18	0	0	0	1	14	13th
2007	Formula One	Red Bull Racing	17	0	0	0	0	14	10th
2008	Formula One	Red Bull Racing	18	0	0	0	1	8	16th
2009	Formula One	Red Bull Racing	Test driver						
2010	Deutsche Tourenwagen Masters	Mücke Motorsport	11	0	0	1	0	1	16th
2011	Deutsche Tourenwagen Masters	Mücke Motorsport	10	0	0	1	0	1	16th
2012	Deutsche Tourenwagen Masters	Mücke Motorsport	10	0	0	0	0	14	15th

=== Complete British Touring Car Championship results ===
(key) (Races in bold indicate pole position in class) (Races in italics indicate fastest lap in class)

Year	Team	Car	Class	1	2	3	4	5	6	7	8	9	10	11	12	13	Overall Pos	Pts	Class Pos
1990	Vauxhall Motorsport	Vauxhall Cavalier	B	OUL	DON	THR	SIL	OUL	SIL	BRH	SNE	BRH ovr:13 cls:7	BIR	DON	THR	SIL	33rd	4	21st

=== Complete British Formula 3 Championship results ===
(key) (Races in bold indicate pole position) (Races in italics indicate fastest lap)

Year	Team	Engine	Class	1	2	3	4	5	6	7	8	9	10	11	12	13	14	15	16	DC	Points
1991	Paul Stewart Racing	Mugen	A	SIL; 4	THR; Ret	DON; 1	BRH; 1	BRH; 2	THR; 3	SIL; 1	DON; Ret	SIL; 7	SIL; 6	SNE; 1	SIL; 3	BRH; 1	DON; 4	SIL; 22	THR; Ret	2nd	64

=== Complete Macau Grand Prix results ===
Year	Team	Car	Overall result
1991	(United Kingdom) Montagut Fashion Paul Stewart Racing	Ralt RT35	**1st**
1992	(United Kingdom) Montagut Fashion Paul Stewart Racing	Reynard 923	NC

=== Complete International Formula 3000 results ===
(key) (Races in bold indicate pole position) (Races in italics indicate fastest lap)

Year	Entrant	Chassis	Engine	1	2	3	4	5	6	7	8	9	10	DC	Points
1992	Paul Stewart Racing	Reynard/92D	Judd	SIL; 7	PAU; Ret	CAT; 8	PER; Ret	HOC; Ret	NÜR; 7	SPA; 4	ALB; 7	NOG; 3	MAG; 3	9th	11
1993	Pacific Racing	Reynard/93D	Ford Cosworth	DON; 13	SIL; 2	PAU; 2	PER; 1	HOC; Ret	NÜR; 7	SPA; 3	MAG; Ret	NOG; Ret		3rd	25
1994	Vortex Motorsport	Reynard/94D	Ford Cosworth	SIL; 2	PAU	CAT	PER	HOC	SPA	EST	MAG			9th	6

=== Complete 24 Hours of Le Mans results ===
Year	Team	Co-Drivers	Car	Class	Laps	Pos.	Class Pos.
1993	(United Kingdom) TWR Jaguar Racing	(Denmark) John Nielsen (Australia) David Brabham	Jaguar XJ220	GT	306	DSQ	DSQ

=== Complete Formula One results ===
(key) (Races in bold indicate pole position; races in italics indicate fastest lap)

Year	Entrant	Chassis	Engine	1	2	3	4	5	6	7	8	9	10	11	12	13	14	15	16	17	18	19	WDC	Points
1994	Rothmans Williams Renault	Williams FW16	Renault RS6 3.5 V10	BRA	PAC	SMR	MON	ESP; Ret	CAN; 5	FRA	GBR; 5												8th	14
1994	Rothmans Williams Renault	Williams FW16B	Renault RS6 3.5 V10									GER; Ret	HUN; Ret	BEL; 4	ITA; 6^{†}	POR; 2	EUR	JPN	AUS				8th	14
1995	Rothmans Williams Renault	Williams FW17	Renault RS7 3.0 V10	BRA; 2	**ARG**; Ret	SMR; 4	ESP; Ret	MON; Ret	CAN; Ret	FRA; 3	GBR; 3	GER; 2	HUN; 2	BEL; Ret	**ITA**; Ret	**POR**; 1							**3rd**	**49**
1995	Rothmans Williams Renault	Williams FW17B	Renault RS7 3.0 V10														**EUR**; 3	**PAC**; 2	JPN; Ret	AUS; Ret			**3rd**	**49**
1996	Marlboro McLaren Mercedes	McLaren MP4/11	Mercedes FO 110/3 3.0 V10	AUS; Ret	BRA; Ret	ARG; 7	EUR; 3	SMR; Ret	MON; 2	ESP; Ret	CAN; 4	FRA; 6											7th	18
1996	Marlboro McLaren Mercedes	McLaren MP4/11B	Mercedes FO 110/3 3.0 V10										GBR; 5	GER; 5	HUN; Ret	BEL; Ret	ITA; Ret	POR; 13	JPN; 8				7th	18
1997	West McLaren Mercedes	McLaren MP4/12	Mercedes FO 110E 3.0 V10	AUS; 1	BRA; 10	ARG; Ret	SMR; Ret	MON; Ret	ESP; 6	CAN; 7													**3rd**	**36**
1997	West McLaren Mercedes	McLaren MP4/12	Mercedes FO 110F 3.0 V10								FRA; 7^{†}	GBR; 4	GER; Ret	HUN; Ret	BEL; Ret	ITA; 1	AUT; 2	LUX; Ret	JPN; 10^{†}	EUR; 2			**3rd**	**36**
1998	West McLaren Mercedes	McLaren MP4/13	Mercedes FO 110G 3.0 V10	AUS; 2	BRA; 2	**ARG**; 6	**SMR**; 1	ESP; 2	MON; Ret	**CAN**; Ret	FRA; 6	GBR; Ret	AUT; 2	GER; 2	HUN; 2	BEL; 7	ITA; Ret	LUX; 3	JPN; 3				**3rd**	**56**
1999	West McLaren Mercedes	McLaren MP4/14	Mercedes FO 110H 3.0 V10	AUS; Ret	BRA; Ret	SMR; 2	MON; Ret	ESP; 2	CAN; 7	FRA; Ret	GBR; 1	AUT; 2	GER; 5	HUN; 2	BEL; 1	ITA; 5	EUR; Ret	MAL; Ret	JPN; Ret				4th	48
2000	West McLaren Mercedes	McLaren MP4/15	Mercedes FO 110J 3.0 V10	AUS; Ret	BRA; DSQ	SMR; 3	GBR; 1	ESP; 2	**EUR**; 3	MON; 1	CAN; 7	FRA; 1	AUT; 2	**GER**; 3	HUN; 3	BEL; 4	ITA; Ret	USA; 5	JPN; 3	MAL; 2			**3rd**	**73**
2001	West McLaren Mercedes	McLaren MP4-16	Mercedes FO 110K 3.0 V10	AUS; 2	MAL; 3	BRA; 1	**SMR**; 2	ESP; 5	AUT; 1	**MON**; 5	CAN; Ret	EUR; 3	FRA; 4	GBR; Ret	GER; Ret	HUN; 3	BEL; 2	ITA; Ret	USA; 3	JPN; 3			**2nd**	**65**
2002	West McLaren Mercedes	McLaren MP4-17	Mercedes FO 110M 3.0 V10	AUS; Ret	MAL; Ret	BRA; 3	SMR; 6	ESP; 3	AUT; 6	MON; 1	CAN; 2	EUR; Ret	GBR; 10	FRA; 3	GER; 5	HUN; 5	BEL; 4	ITA; 7	USA; 3	JPN; Ret			5th	41
2003	West McLaren Mercedes	McLaren MP4-17D	Mercedes FO 110M/P 3.0 V10	AUS; 1	MAL; Ret	BRA; 4	SMR; 5	ESP; Ret	AUT; 5	MON; 7	CAN; Ret	EUR; 15^{†}	FRA; 5	GBR; 5	GER; 2	HUN; 5	ITA; Ret	USA; Ret	JPN; 3				7th	51
2004	West McLaren Mercedes	McLaren MP4-19	Mercedes FO 110Q 3.0 V10	AUS; 8	MAL; 6	BHR; Ret	SMR; 12	ESP; 10	MON; Ret	EUR; Ret	CAN; 6	USA; 7											10th	24
2004	West McLaren Mercedes	McLaren MP4-19B	Mercedes FO 110Q 3.0 V10										FRA; 6	GBR; 7	GER; 4	HUN; 9	BEL; 7	ITA; 6	CHN; 9	JPN; Ret	BRA; 11		10th	24
2005	Red Bull Racing	Red Bull RB1	Cosworth TJ2005 3.0 V10	AUS; 4	MAL; 6	BHR; 8	SMR; 11	ESP; 8	MON; Ret	EUR; 4	CAN; 7	USA; DNS	FRA; 10	GBR; 13	GER; 7	HUN; Ret	TUR; 7	ITA; 15	BEL; Ret	BRA; Ret	JPN; 6	CHN; 9	12th	24
2006	Red Bull Racing	Red Bull RB2	Ferrari 056 2.4 V8	BHR; 10	MAL; Ret	AUS; 8	SMR; Ret	EUR; Ret	ESP; 14	MON; 3	GBR; 12	CAN; 8	USA; 7	FRA; 9	GER; 11	HUN; 5	TUR; 15^{†}	ITA; 12	CHN; 9	JPN; Ret	BRA; Ret		13th	14
2007	Red Bull Racing	Red Bull RB3	Renault RS27 2.4 V8	AUS; Ret	MAL; Ret	BHR; Ret	ESP; 5	MON; 14	CAN; Ret	USA; Ret	FRA; 13	GBR; 11	EUR; 5	HUN; 11	TUR; 10	ITA; Ret	BEL; Ret	JPN; 4	CHN; 8	BRA; 9			10th	14
2008	Red Bull Racing	Red Bull RB4	Renault RS27 2.4 V8	AUS; Ret	MAL; 9	BHR; 18	ESP; 12	TUR; 9	MON; Ret	CAN; 3	FRA; 9	GBR; Ret	GER; 13	HUN; 11	EUR; 17	BEL; 11	ITA; 16	SIN; 7	JPN; Ret	CHN; 10	BRA; Ret		16th	8

^{†} Did not finish, but was classified as he had completed more than 90% of the race distance.

=== Complete Deutsche Tourenwagen Masters results ===
(key) (Races in bold indicate pole position) (Races in italics indicate fastest lap)

Year	Team	Car	1	2	3	4	5	6	7	8	9	10	11	Pos.	Points
2010	Mücke Motorsport	AMG-Mercedes C-Klasse 2008	HOC; 12	VAL; 13	LAU; Ret	NOR; 13	NÜR; 10	ZAN; 12	BRH; 12	OSC; 14	HOC; Ret	ADR; 10	SHA; 8	16th	1
2011	Mücke Motorsport	AMG-Mercedes C-Klasse 2008	HOC; 10	ZAN; 16	SPL; 9	LAU; 13	NOR; 8	NÜR; 17	BRH; 12	OSC; 10	VAL; DSQ	HOC; 17†		16th	1
2012	Mücke Motorsport	AMG-Mercedes C-Klasse Coupé	HOC; 8	LAU; 12	BRH; 15	SPL; Ret	NOR; 5	NÜR; 20	ZAN; Ret	OSC; Ret	VAL; 11	HOC; Ret		15th	14

† Retired, but was classified as he completed 90% of the winner's race distance

Sporting positions
Preceded by Inaugural	Masters of Formula 3 Winner; 1991	Succeeded by Pedro Lamy
Preceded by Michael Schumacher	Macau Grand Prix; Winner; 1991	Succeeded by Rickard Rydell
Preceded by Romain Grosjean (2012)	Race of Champions; Champion of Champions; 2014	Succeeded by Sebastian Vettel
Preceded by Juan Pablo Montoya	Race of Champions; Champion of Champions; 2018	Succeeded by Benito Guerra Jr.
Trade union offices
Preceded by Michael Schumacher	GPDA Chairman; 2005–2006	Succeeded by Ralf Schumacher
Awards and achievements
Preceded by Allan McNish	Autosport; British Club Driver of the Year; 1989	Succeeded by Warren Hughes
Preceded by Inaugural	McLaren Autosport BRDC Award; 1989	Succeeded by Gareth Rees
Preceded by Robb Gravett	Autosport; National Racing Driver of the Year; 1991	Succeeded by Tim Harvey
Preceded by Damon Hill	Autosport; British Competition Driver of the Year; 1994	Succeeded by Damon Hill
Preceded by Ivan Capelli (1992)	Lorenzo Bandini Trophy; 1995	Succeeded by Jacques Villeneuve
Preceded by Jacques Villeneuve	Hawthorn Memorial Trophy; 1998	Succeeded by Eddie Irvine
Preceded by Eddie Irvine	Hawthorn Memorial Trophy; 2000–2003	Succeeded by Jenson Button
Preceded by Eddie Irvine	Autosport; British Competition Driver of the Year; 2000–2002	Succeeded by Jenson Button
