= 1992 Macau Grand Prix =

Formula Three motor race

Race details
Date	21 & 22 November 1992
Location	Guia Circuit, Macau
Course	Temporary street circuit 6.120 km (3.803 mi)
Distance	Leg 1; 15 laps, 91.76 km (57.02 mi); Leg 2; 15 laps, 91.76 km (57.02 mi)
- Leg 1

Pole
Driver	(Sweden) Rickard Rydell	Takasu Clinic Racing Team
Time	2:19.29

Fastest Lap
Driver	(Portugal) Pedro Lamy	WTS Racing
Time	2:19.26

Podium
First	(Sweden) Rickard Rydell	Takasu Clinic Racing Team
Second	(Portugal) Pedro Lamy	WTS Racing
Third	(Canada) Jacques Villeneuve	TOM'S
- Leg 2

Pole
Driver	(Sweden) Rickard Rydell	Takasu Clinic Racing Team

Fastest Lap
Driver	(Italy) Massimiliano Angelelli	RC Motorsport
Time	2:19.53

Podium
First	(Sweden) Rickard Rydell	Takasu Clinic Racing Team
Second	(Portugal) Pedro Lamy	WTS Racing
Third	(Canada) Jacques Villeneuve	TOM'S

The 1992 Macau Grand Prix was a motor race held in two parts on the Guia Circuit in Macau on 21 & 22 November 1992. It was 39th Macau Grand Prix and the ninth edition to be open to Formula Three cars. The race also carried the title of FIA Formula 3 Intercontinental Cup.

The race was won by Rickard Rydell driving a TOM's 032F - Toyota for TOM's Racing.

== Entry list ==
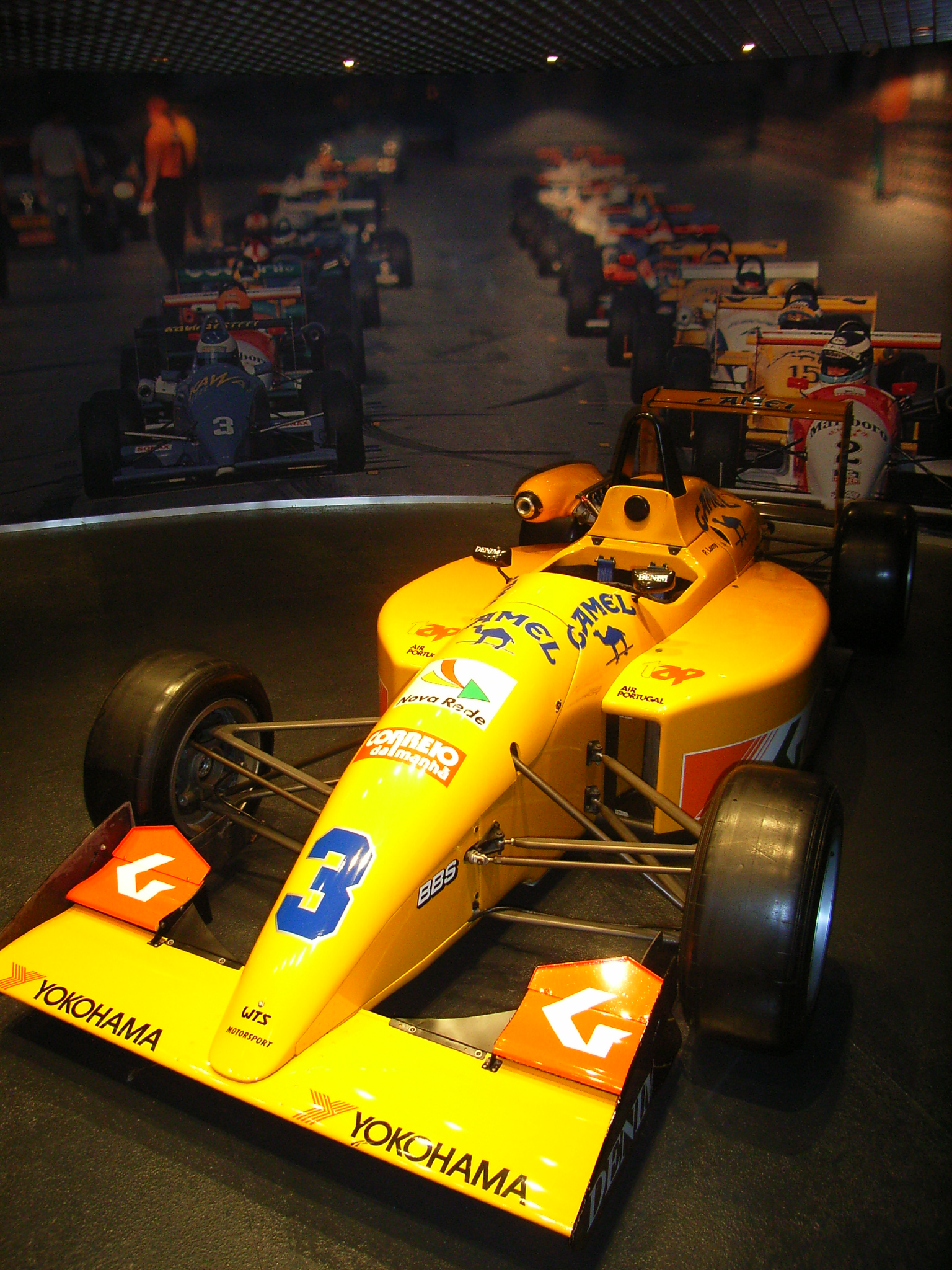
Pedro Lamy placed second in the Grand Prix driving a Reynard 923 for WTS Racing

Team	No	Driver	Vehicle	Engine
(United Kingdom) Montagut Paul Stewart Racing	1	(United Kingdom) David Coulthard	Reynard 923	Mugen-Honda
(United Kingdom) Montagut Paul Stewart Racing	2	(Brazil) Gil de Ferran	Reynard 923	Mugen-Honda
(Germany) Camel WTS Racing	3	(Portugal) Pedro Lamy	Reynard 923	Opel
(United Kingdom) Casio West Surrey Racing	5	(Spain) Jordi Gené	Reynard 923	Mugen-Honda
(United Kingdom) Casio West Surrey Racing	6	(Brazil) Oswaldo Negri Jr.	Reynard 923	Mugen-Honda
(Italy) Luckfook RC Motorsport	7	(Italy) Massimiliano Angelelli	Dallara 392	Opel
(Italy) Luckfook RC Motorsport	8	(Italy) Roberto Colciago	Dallara 392	Opel
(Hong Kong) Theodore Racing w/ Edenbridge Racing	9	(Brazil) Rubens Barrichello	Ralt RT36	Vauxhall
(Japan) Tomei Sport	10	(United Kingdom) Anthony Reid	Reynard 923	Mugen-Honda
(United Kingdom) Kawai Steel Fortec Motorsports	11	(United Kingdom) Kelvin Burt	Reynard 923	Mugen-Honda
(Germany) Kawai Steel GM Motorsport	12	(Germany) Marco Werner	Ralt RT36	Opel
(Germany) GM Motorsport	15	(Germany) Michael Krumm	Ralt RT36	Opel
(Belgium) Tag Hauer Alan Docking Racing	16	(France) Christophe Bouchut	Ralt RT36	Mugen-Honda
(Belgium) Tag Hauer Alan Docking Racing	17	(Belgium) Philippe Adams	Ralt RT36	Mugen-Honda
(France) KTR	18	(France) Olivier Thevenin	Ralt RT36	Volkswagen
(Germany) Volkswagen Motorsport	19	(Portugal) Diogo Castro Santos	Ralt RT36	Volkswagen
(Germany) Volkswagen Motorsport	20	(Germany) Sascha Maassen	Ralt RT36	Volkswagen
(Austria) RSM Marko	21	(France) Emmanuel Clérico	Reynard 923	Alfa Romeo
(Austria) RSM Marko	35	(Germany) Jörg Müller	Reynard 923	Alfa Romeo
(Japan) TOM'S	22	(Canada) Jacques Villeneuve	TOM'S 032F	Toyota
(Japan) Takasu Clinic Racing Team w/ TOM'S	23	(Sweden) Rickard Rydell	TOM'S 032F	Toyota
(Japan) Navi Connection Racing Team w/ TOM'S	25	(Denmark) Tom Kristensen	TOM'S 032F	Toyota
(Switzerland) Jacques Isler Racing	26	(Switzerland) Jacques Isler	Reynard 923	Alfa Romeo
(Switzerland) Jacques Isler Racing	28	(Austria) Philipp Peter	Reynard 923	Alfa Romeo
(United Kingdom) P1 Engineering	29	(Belgium) Mikke van Hool	Reynard 923	Mugen-Honda
(Sweden) Claes Rothstein Motorsport	30	(Sweden) Peter Aslund	Ralt RT36	Volkswagen
(Japan) Capcom Racing	31	(Japan) Akira Ishikawa	Ralt RT36	Mugen-Honda
(France) Formula Project	32	(France) Stéphan Grégoire	Ralt RT36	Mugen-Honda
(Sweden) Cabin Racing Team / IMPUL	33	(Japan) Kazuaki Takamura	Ralt RT36	Mugen-Honda
(United Kingdom) Madgwick Motorsport	36	(Australia) Russell Ingall	Van Diemen RF92	Mugen
(United Kingdom) Madgwick Motorsport	37	(France) Jean-Christophe Boullion	Van Diemen RF92	Mugen

== Race results ==
The race was won by Rickard Rydell driving a TOM's 032F - Toyota for TOM's Racing. Rydell's aggregate time for the two parts was 1 hour 10 minutes 54.04 seconds.
