= Red Bull RB4 =

Formula One racing car

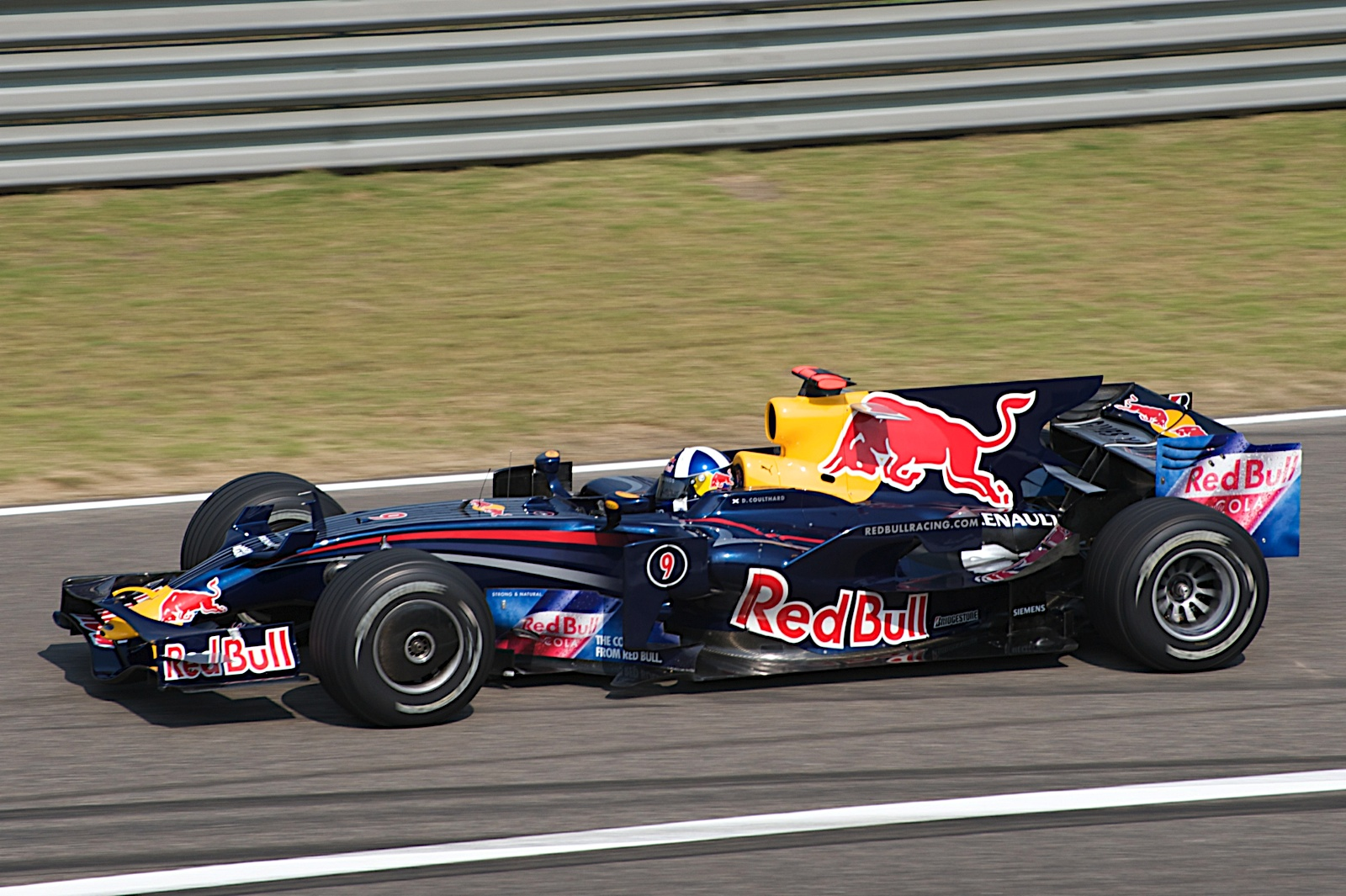
- David Coulthard driving the RB4 during qualifying of the 2008 Chinese Grand Prix
- Category: Formula One
- Constructor: Red Bull
- Designers: Adrian Newey (Chief Technical Officer); Geoff Willis (Technical Director); Rob Marshall (Chief Designer); Iain Bomphray (Chief Engineer, Composites); Andrew Green (Head of R&D); Peter Prodromou (Head of Aerodynamics); Dan Fallows (Chief Aerodynamicist)
- Predecessor: RB3
- Successor: RB5

Technical specifications
- Chassis: Carbon-fibre and honeycomb composite monocoque
- Suspension (front): Aluminium alloy uprights, upper and lower carbon wishbones and pushrods, torsion bar springs and anti roll bars, Multimatic dampers.
- Suspension (rear): Aluminium alloy uprights, upper and lower carbon wishbones and pushrods, torsion bar springs and anti roll bars, Multimatic dampers
- Engine: Renault RS27-2008 2400cc V8, naturally aspirated, mid-engine, longitudinally-mounted, 19,000 RPM Limited
- Transmission: 7-speed hydraulic power-shift
- Power: >750 hp @ 19,000 rpm
- Fuel: Elf
- Tyres: Bridgestone Potenza; OZ Racing Front: 12.0 to 12.7in x 13in Wheels; OZ Racing Rear: 13.7in x 13in Wheels

Competition history
- Notable entrants: Red Bull Racing
- Notable drivers: 9. (United Kingdom) David Coulthard; 10. (Australia) Mark Webber
- Debut: 2008 Australian Grand Prix
- Last event: 2008 Brazilian Grand Prix
Races	Wins	Podiums	Poles	F/Laps
18	0	1	0	0

The Red Bull RB4 is a Formula One racing car with which the Red Bull Racing team competed in the 2008 Formula One season.

== Launch ==
The RB4 is the team's second Adrian Newey-designed car; this car has had the help of Geoff Willis whom the team had recruited from Honda in 2007. The car included the Renault R27-2008 engine, the second year the Renault engine had powered the Red Bull team.

The car was launched at the Jerez Circuit on 16 January 2008, the same day the RB4 was taken for its first shakedown laps by driver David Coulthard, Mark Webber got his first taste of the RB4 at the Valencia Circuit on 24 January 2008, who described the car as "encouraging" and "a big step forward".

== Technical developments ==
As all teams had to conform to the new set of 2008 regulations, the RB4 had the new standard electronic control unit, produced by McLaren Electronic Systems, that aims to prevent the use of driver aids such as traction control and engine braking.

At the February 1 test at Barcelona, the RB4 sported a radical new fin-shaped engine cover. This was part of the initial aerodynamic package changes that most teams implemented before the opening round in Australia. Webber drove the RB4 with the "Shark fin," while Coulthard used a more conventionally shaped RB4. From the Australian Grand Prix onwards, both cars had a shark fin attached to the engine cover.

== 2008 season ==
=== Testing ===
The RB4 was a contender for "the best of the rest" title in testing for the 2008 season, with both Webber and Coulthard topping the timesheets.

However both drivers had a couple of small incidents, with Coulthard "kissing the wall" between turns 7 and 8 at the Circuit de Catalunya on 19 February 2008, and Webber having some minor kerb damage on the monocoque, which could "not be repaired in time to resume testing" on his first day driving the RB4.

Even considering the setbacks and competitive times, the team and both drivers were making sure but steady progress throughout the 2008 testing season, optimising the RB4 to the new rules and regulations. The team was pleased with the car's performance through the testing season before the season opener in Australia.

=== Vettel testing RB4 ===
Toro Rosso driver and future Red Bull driver Sebastian Vettel had the opportunity of testing the RB4 at the Barcelona test between 18 and 20 February 2008 as Coulthard had a trapped nerve. Vettel tested the car on the 19th, the middle day of testing.

Vettel completed 109 laps, and came in 7th with a time of 1:22.558, the same day Webber came in 17th with a time of 1:23.458 after doing 58 laps. The top driver that day was Lewis Hamilton, in a McLaren-Mercedes, with a time of 1:21.234 after 81 laps completed.

=== Season ===
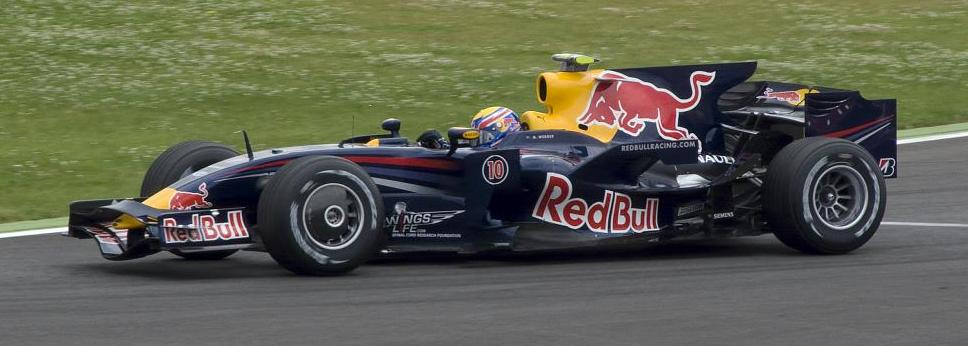
Mark Webber driving the RB4 at the 2008 French Grand Prix

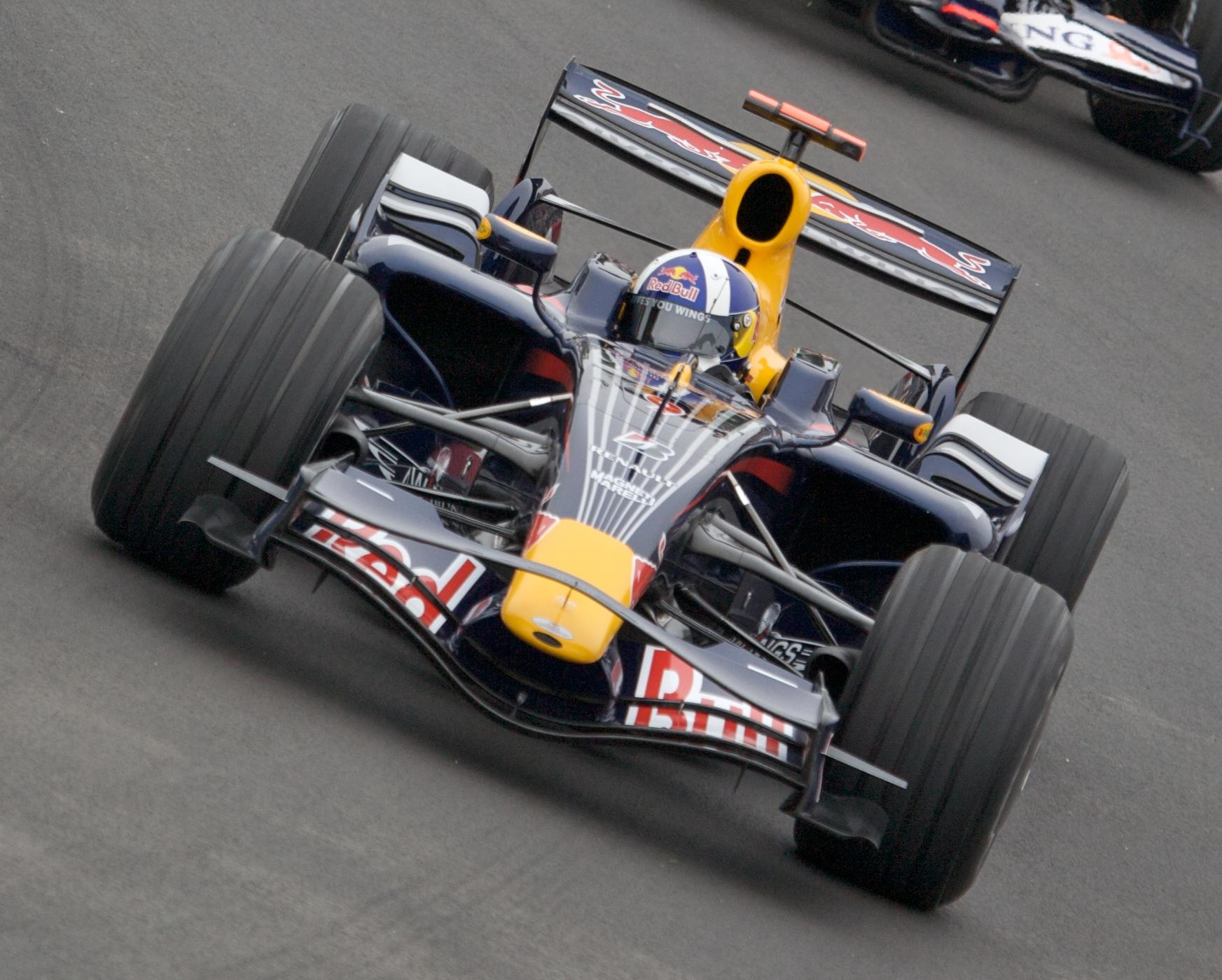
David Coulthard driving the RB4 at the 2008 Canadian Grand Prix

Despite Webber's second-place qualifying in Britain, where Coulthard announced his retirement at the end of the season, Red Bull had a summer of lackluster results, until the Belgian Grand Prix when Webber scored a point for eighth place after starting seventh on the grid. At the following Grand Prix in Italy, Webber moved up to third on the grid, battling with the top teams before spinning and finishing eighth.

In Singapore, Webber and Coulthard failed to qualify for Q3 and set the 13th and 14th fastest times in the session. The Coulthard moved up to seventh and collected the final points of his career, while Webber retired on lap 29 with a gearbox issue. His team Red Bull Racing later claimed that a momentary electrical surge caused by a passing underground tram made the gearbox select two gears at once. The incident occurred in Turn 13. A tram line goes right underneath that section of the race track. These allegations were later denied by the city-state's railway operator. At the following round in Japan, Webber finished eighth after starting from thirteenth place, while Coulthard, who started eleventh, lost control of his RB4 at the second corner and violently hit the tyre barrier.

== Sponsorship and livery ==
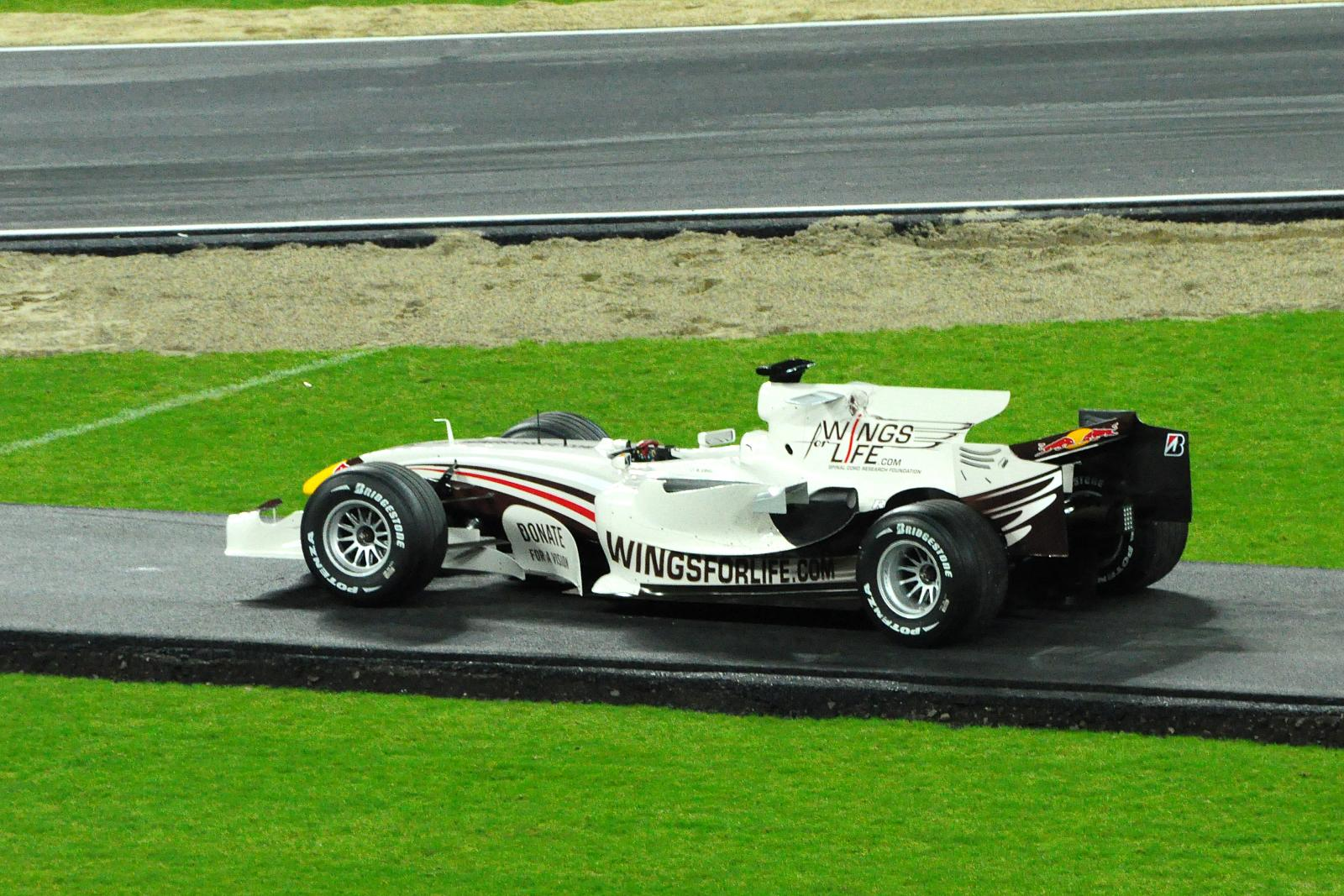
RB4 with the "Wings for Life" livery, pictured at the 2008 Race of Champions

At the German Grand Prix Red Bull Cola was launched, the brand was advertised on the bargeboards and rear wing in certain races. At the Japanese Grand Prix, the 7-Eleven sponsor appears on the endplate of the car's rear wing.

In Brazil, Coulthard's RB4 was decorated in the livery of "Wings for Life", a charity dedicated to raising awareness of spinal cord injuries. Coulthard said: "I'm dedicating my last race to the vision of making paraplegia curable." Red Bull received approval from the Fédération Internationale de l'Automobile, Formula One's governing body, to run Coulthard's car in different colours than his teammate Webber.

== Complete Formula One results ==
(key)

Year	Team	Engine	Tyres	Drivers	1	2	3	4	5	6	7	8	9	10	11	12	13	14	15	16	17	18	Points	WCC
2008	Red Bull	Renault V8	B		AUS	MAL	BHR	ESP	TUR	MON	CAN	FRA	GBR	GER	HUN	EUR	BEL	ITA	SIN	JPN	CHN	BRA	29	7th
2008	Red Bull	Renault V8	B	(United Kingdom) David Coulthard	Ret	9	18	12	9	Ret	3	9	Ret	13	11	17	11	16	7	Ret	10	Ret	29	7th
2008	Red Bull	Renault V8	B	(Australia) Mark Webber	Ret	7	7	5	7	4	12	6	10	Ret	9	12	8	8	Ret	8	14	9	29	7th
