= 1991 Macau Grand Prix =

Formula Three motor race

Race details
Date	24 November 1991
Location	Guia Circuit, Macau
Course	Temporary street circuit 6.120 km (3.803 mi)
Distance	Leg 1; 15 laps, 73.44 km (45.63 mi); Leg 2; 15 laps, 73.44 km (45.63 mi)
- Leg 1

Pole
Driver	(Sweden) Rickard Rydell	TOM'S
Time	2:20.10

Fastest Lap
Driver	(United Kingdom) David Coulthard	Paul Stewart Racing
Time	2:20.21

Podium
First	(United Kingdom) David Coulthard	Paul Stewart Racing
Second	(Spain) Jordi Gené	West Surrey Racing
Third	(Sweden) Rickard Rydell	TOM'S
- Leg 2

Pole
Driver	(United Kingdom) David Coulthard	Paul Stewart Racing

Fastest Lap
Driver	(Spain) Jordi Gené	West Surrey Racing
Time	2:19.63

Podium
First	(United Kingdom) David Coulthard	Paul Stewart Racing
Second	(Spain) Jordi Gené	West Surrey Racing
Third	(Brazil) Christian Fittipaldi	Theodore Racing

The 1991 Macau Grand Prix Formula Three was the 38th Macau Grand Prix race to be held on the streets of Macau on 24 November 1991. It was the eighth edition for Formula Three cars.

== Entry list ==
Team	No	Driver	Vehicle	Engine
(Japan) Kawai Steel TOM'S	1	(Sweden) Rickard Rydell	TOM'S 031F	Toyota
(Japan) Kawai Steel TOM'S	2	(Argentina) Víctor Rosso	TOM'S 031F	Toyota
(Japan) Ito Ham Racing TOM'S	3	(Brazil) Paulo Carcasci	TOM'S 031F	Toyota
(British Hong Kong) Theodore Racing w/ Edenbridge Racing	5	(Brazil) Gil de Ferran	Reynard 913	Mugen-Honda
(British Hong Kong) Theodore Racing w/ Edenbridge Racing	6	(Brazil) Christian Fittipaldi	Reynard 913	Mugen-Honda
(Germany) Watsons Water Volkswagen Motorsport	7	(Denmark) Tom Kristensen	Ralt RT35	Volkswagen
(Germany) Watsons Water Volkswagen Motorsport	8	(Italy) Giambattista Busi	Ralt RT35	Volkswagen
(United Kingdom) Montagut Fashion Paul Stewart Racing	9	(United Kingdom) Paul Stewart	Ralt RT35	Mugen-Honda
(United Kingdom) Montagut Fashion Paul Stewart Racing	10	(United Kingdom) David Coulthard	Ralt RT35	Mugen-Honda
(United Kingdom) Casio West Surrey Racing	11	(Brazil) Rubens Barrichello	Ralt RT35	Mugen-Honda
(United Kingdom) Casio West Surrey Racing	12	(Spain) Jordi Gené	Ralt RT35	Mugen-Honda
(United Kingdom) Watsons Water West Surrey Racing	15	(United Kingdom) Julian Bailey	Ralt RT35	Mugen-Honda
(Italy) Mr. Juicy Supercars	16	(Italy) Luca Badoer	Dallara 391	Alfa Romeo
(United Kingdom) Watsons Racing w/ Mönninghoff Sport Promotion	17	(Germany) Marc Hessel	Ralt RT35	Mugen-Honda
(France) Takasu Clinic Graff Racing	18	(France) Christophe Bouchut	Ralt RT33	Volkswagen
(France) Takasu Clinic Graff Racing	19	(France) Eric Cheli	Bowman BC1	Volkswagen
(Germany) G+M Escom Motorsport	20	(Germany) Marco Werner	Ralt RT35	Opel
(Germany) Bongers Motorsport	21	(Germany) Jörg Müller	Reynard 913	Volkswagen
(United Kingdom) Alan Docking Racing	22	(Netherlands) Marcel Albers	Ralt RT35	Mugen-Honda
(United Kingdom) Alan Docking Racing	23	(Japan) Hideki Noda	Ralt RT35	Mugen-Honda
(Italy) Luckfook Prema Racing	26	(Canada) Jacques Villeneuve	Ralt RT35	Alfa Romeo
(Italy) Luckfook Prema Racing	27	(Italy) Domenico Schiattarella	Ralt RT35	Alfa Romeo
(Italy) RC Motorsport	28	(Italy) Andrea Gilardi	Dallara 391	Volkswagen
(Italy) RC Motorsport	29	(Italy) Massimiliano Angelelli	Dallara 391	Volkswagen
(Japan) Torii Racing	30	(Japan) Tetsuya Tanaka	Ralt RT35	Toyota
(Japan) Tomei Racing	31	(Japan) Masami Kageyama	Ralt RT35	Mugen-Honda
(France) Formula Project	32	(France) Franck Lagorce	Reynard 913	Alfa Romeo
(France) ASA Rhin	33	(France) Yvan Muller	Reynard 913	Alfa Romeo
(Switzerland) Jo Zeller Racing	37	(Switzerland) Jo Zeller	Ralt RT34	Alfa Romeo
(Japan) Team Itchi Ban	38	(Sweden) Niclas Jönsson	Reynard 913	Mugen-Honda
