= Karen Minier =

Belgian television presenter

- Born: 22 March 1973 (age 53); Charleroi, Belgium
- Occupation: television presenter
- Spouse: David Coulthard (m. 2013; div. 2022)
- Children: 2

Karen Minier (born 22 March 1973) is a Belgian television presenter.

She studied journalism at the Free University of Brussels, and was then signed to a modelling agency. She interviewed Formula One drivers for the 2003/4 seasons for the French TF1 show F1 in one and presented the show They have ways of making you talk in 2005 on Teva. She participated in the Rally du Princess in 2005 and 2006, during which she won a stage. In 2006, she co-presented 4 episodes of Les enfants de la télé alongside Arthur. After the birth of her son, she resumed modelling with the Dominique Models Agency.

In 2005, she started a relationship with Scottish Formula One driver David Coulthard. Minier gave birth to the couple's son on 21 November 2008, in Brussels. Minier has a daughter from a previous relationship. The couple were married in Monaco on 27 November 2013. They divorced in 2022.
