= 2008 Race of Champions =

Motor racing competition

Seasons
- ← 2007 2009 →

Layout of 2008 Race of Champions

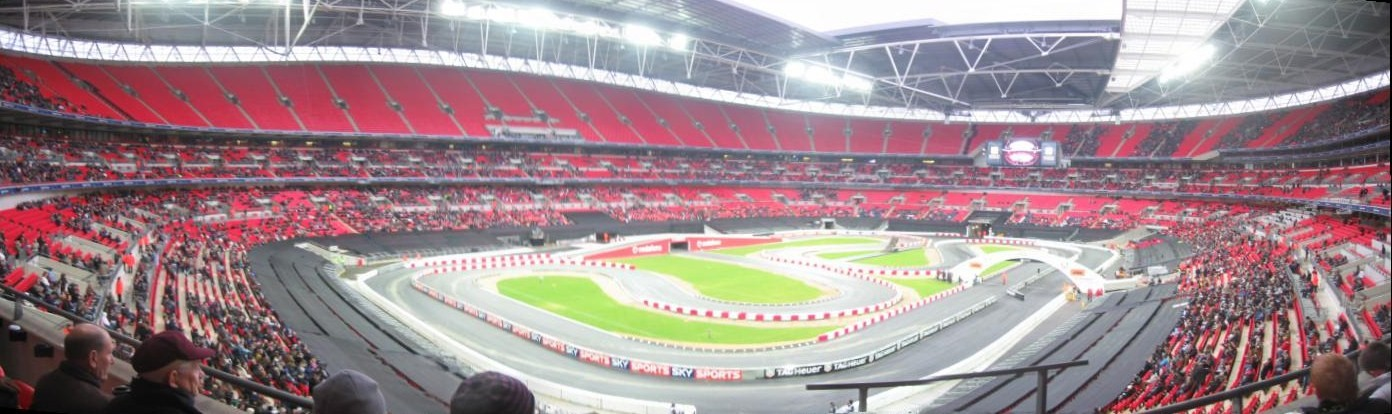
Wembley Stadium panorama during event

The 2008 Race of Champions was the 21st running of the event, and took place on December 14, 2008 at Wembley Stadium, London. Two special races were due to take place during the event, the first of which, with Olympic gold medallist Chris Hoy cycling against the reigning Formula One World Champion Lewis Hamilton, who was due to be driving a Mercedes road car. However, due to the slippery track at Wembley, Hoy could not take part on the bicycle. Hamilton did demonstrate his championship-winning Vodafone McLaren Mercedes Formula One car at the event, his first major British public appearance since winning the F1 title. There was also a celebrity race, with eight celebrities taking part in Fiat 500 Abarth Assetto Corses. These celebrities were Hoy, boxers Frank Bruno, David Haye, Amir Khan and Enzo Maccarinelli, chef James Martin, footballer Bacary Sagna and singer Shayne Ward.

== Participants ==
Team	Drivers	2008 series
(Australia) (Spain) All-Stars	Jaime Alguersuari	British Formula Three
(Australia) (Spain) All-Stars	Troy Bayliss	Superbike
France	Sébastien Loeb	WRC
France	Yvan Muller	WTCC
Germany	Michael Schumacher	none
Germany	Sebastian Vettel	Formula One
(United Kingdom) Autosport Great Britain	Jenson Button	Formula One
(United Kingdom) Autosport Great Britain	Andy Priaulx	WTCC
(United Kingdom) F1 Racing Great Britain	David Coulthard	Formula One
(United Kingdom) F1 Racing Great Britain	Jason Plato	BTCC
(United Kingdom) (Republic of Ireland) Ireland & UK	Adam Carroll	A1GP
(United Kingdom) (Republic of Ireland) Ireland & UK	Gareth MacHale	ITRC
(Denmark) (Sweden) Scandinavia	Mattias Ekström	DTM
(Denmark) (Sweden) Scandinavia	Tom Kristensen	DTM
United States	Carl Edwards	NASCAR
United States	Tanner Foust	Formula D

== Cars ==
- Abarth 500 Assetto Corse
- Ford Focus RS WRC
- KTM X-Bow
- ROC Car
- RX Racing RX150
- Solution F Prototype

== Driver's Cup ==
Round of 16
ROC Car
(Germany) Michael Schumacher	1:57.4237
(Denmark) Tom Kristensen	1:57.6458
KTM X-Bow
(United States) Carl Edwards	2:03.8596
(Spain) Jaime Alguersuari	2:09.4400
ROC Car
(England) Jenson Button	2:01.0113
(United States) Tanner Foust	2:00.7626
Abarth 500 Assetto Corse
(Scotland) David Coulthard	2:01.3962
(Republic of Ireland) Gareth MacHale	2:05.4632
Ford Focus RS WRC
(Guernsey) Andy Priaulx	1:50.0708
(England) Jason Plato	1:53.3887
ROC Car
(Sweden) Mattias Ekström	1:57.9151
(United Kingdom) Adam Carroll	1:59.7404
KTM X-Bow
(France) Sébastien Loeb	2:01.1834
(France) Yvan Muller	2:01.7783
RX Racing RX150
(Germany) Sebastian Vettel	1:58.5103
(Australia) Troy Bayliss	2:01.2981

Quarter-finals
Abarth 500 Assetto Corse
(Germany) Michael Schumacher	2:03.1025
(United States) Carl Edwards	2:01.3532
KTM X-Bow
(United States) Tanner Foust	2:17.4159
(Scotland) David Coulthard	1:56.1267
Ford Focus RS WRC
(Guernsey) Andy Priaulx	1:48.5699
(Sweden) Mattias Ekström	1:48.6826
RX Racing RX150
(France) Sébastien Loeb	1:58.4506
(Germany) Sebastian Vettel	1:59.8578

Semi-finals
KTM X-Bow
(United States) Carl Edwards	1:57.8658
(Scotland) David Coulthard	1:58.8682
Abarth 500 Assetto Corse
(Guernsey) Andy Priaulx	1:58.8938
(France) Sébastien Loeb	1:57.9127

Final
(Scotland) David Coulthard	1
(France) Sébastien Loeb	2

=== Final ===
Driver 1	Time 1	Car	Driver 2	Time 2
(Scotland) David Coulthard	1:58.3783	ROC Car	(France) Sébastien Loeb	1:57.1867
(Scotland) David Coulthard	1:54.8969	KTM X-Bow	(France) Sébastien Loeb	1:55.8669
(Scotland) David Coulthard	1:54.8498	ROC Car	(France) Sébastien Loeb	1:54.5284

== Nations' Cup ==
Quarter-finals
France	0
(Denmark) (Sweden) Scandinavia	2
(United States) USA	0
(United Kingdom) Autosport Great Britain	2
(United Kingdom) F1 Racing Great Britain	2
(Australia) (Spain) All-Stars	0
Germany	2
(Republic of Ireland) (United Kingdom) Ireland & UK	0

Semi-finals
(Denmark) (Sweden) Scandinavia	2
(United Kingdom) Autosport Great Britain	1
(United Kingdom) F1 Racing Great Britain	0
Germany	2

Final
(Denmark) (Sweden) Scandinavia	1
Germany	2

=== Quarterfinals ===
Team 1	Time 1	Score	Team 2	Time 2	Car
France		0-2	(Denmark) (Sweden) Scandinavia		
Yvan Muller	2:10.2357	0-2	Tom Kristensen	2:08.0568	Abarth 500 Assetto Corse
Sébastien Loeb	1:52.5112	0-2	Mattias Ekström	1:52.4182	Ford Focus RS WRC
(United States) USA		0-2	(United Kingdom) Autosport Great Britain		
Carl Edwards	2:20.6230	0-2	Jenson Button	2:10.5220	Abarth 500 Assetto Corse
Tanner Foust	2:05.4963	0-2	Andy Priaulx	1:53.4400	Ford Focus RS WRC
(United Kingdom) F1 Racing Great Britain		2-0	(Australia) (Spain) All-Stars		
David Coulthard	2:06.2057	2-0	Jaime Alguersuari	2:09.5030	KTM X-Bow
Jason Plato	2:05.8577	2-0	Troy Bayliss	2:17.6845	RX Racing RX150
Germany		2-0	(Republic of Ireland) (United Kingdom) Ireland & UK		
Michael Schumacher	2:02.8599	2-0	Adam Carroll	2:06.3634	KTM X-Bow
Sebastian Vettel	2:05.9037	2-0	Gareth MacHale	2:09.1824	RX Racing RX150

=== Semifinals ===
Team 1	Time 1	Score	Team 2	Time 2	Car
(Denmark) (Sweden) Scandinavia		2-1	(United Kingdom) Autosport Great Britain		
Tom Kristensen	2:03.8547	2-1	Jenson Button	2:04.1408	Abarth 500 Assetto Corse
Mattias Ekström	1:56.7711	2-1	Andy Priaulx	1:51.2288	Ford Focus RS WRC
Tom Kristensen	2:01.5089	2-1	Andy Priaulx	2:01.6746	ROC Car
(United Kingdom) F1 Racing Great Britain		0-2	Germany		
David Coulthard	2:20.8868	0-2	Michael Schumacher	2:20.1079	KTM X-Bow
Jason Plato	2:02.7721	0-2	Sebastian Vettel	2:01.4088	RX Racing RX150

=== Final ===
Team 1	Time 1	Score	Team 2	Time 2	Car
(Denmark) (Sweden) Scandinavia		1-2	Germany		
Tom Kristensen	2:00.4110	1-2	Michael Schumacher	2:00.2381	ROC Car
Mattias Ekström	1:59.6465	1-2	Sebastian Vettel	2:01.2331	KTM X-Bow
Mattias Ekström	1:59.7265	1-2	Michael Schumacher	1:56.5219	ROC Car

== See also ==
- Race of Champions
