= Montagut (clothing) =

French clothing company

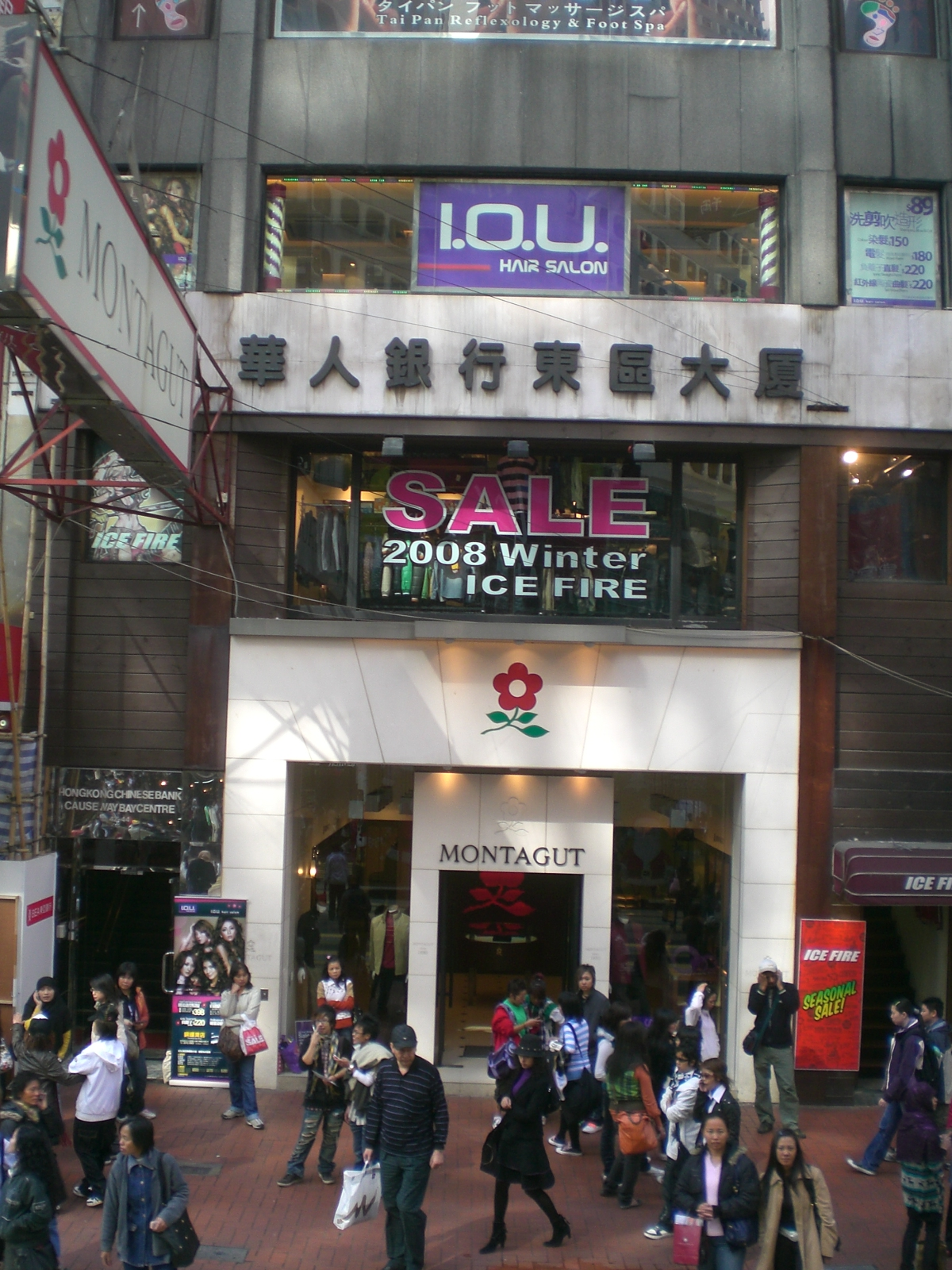
Shop in Hong Kong

Montagut is a clothing company located in Saint-Sauveur-de-Montagut in the Auzene Valley, France. There, in 1880, Pierre Gros's great-great-grandfather founded a silk yarn factory. This activity went on from generation to generation. In 1925, Georges Tinland (Pierre's grandfather) set up a knitting factory in the same location. Tinland was the first to sell Montagut lingerie and silk stockings. These products were a big commercial success between the two world wars. As early as 1939, Montagut started to work on synthetic fibers and rapidly became an expert in knitting rayon and man-made fibers. In 1952, the Tinland and the Gros families united, and Leo Gros, Pierre's father, started modifying the stocking knitting machines to produce sweaters.

In 1962, Leo Gros invented the Fil Lumière, a bright and shiny yarn, strong and elastic. The clothing and polo shirts manufactured with Fil Lumière rapidly became successful in France and abroad.

Today, Montagut is present and well known in many countries for the quality of its garments. It is particularly well-known in China. Having entered the market since the late 1970s, its presence has grown exponentially to over 3000 boutiques across the country as of 2007.
