= 2011 Race of Champions =

Motor racing competition

Seasons
- ← 2010 2012 →

Layout of 2011 Race of Champions

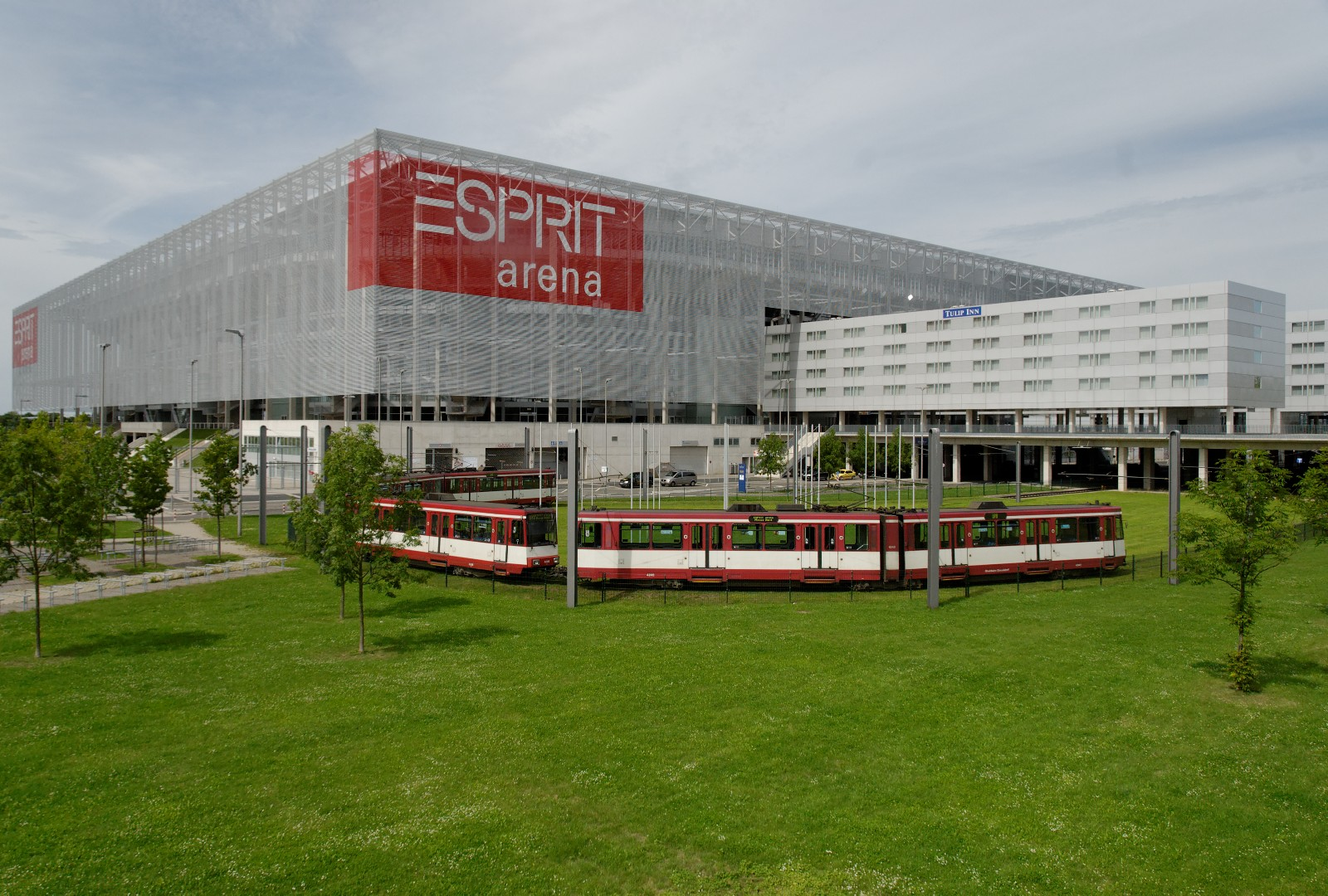
The Esprit Arena, the venue for the 2011 Race of Champions.

The 2011 Race of Champions was the 24th running of the event, and took place over 3–4 December 2011 at the Esprit Arena in Düsseldorf, Germany. The Commerzbank-Arena in Frankfurt had been scheduled to hold the event, but after Eintracht Frankfurt's relegation to German football's Second Division, the stadium could no longer host the event on those dates. It was the second consecutive time, and third time overall, that the event has been held in Germany, after the 2010 event was also held in Düsseldorf. Sebastien Ogier overcame Tom Kristensen in the final to become Champion of Champions, whilst Team Germany took their fifth consecutive Nations Cup victory courtesy of Sebastian Vettel and Michael Schumacher. Heinz-Harald Frentzen also won the ROC Legends Trophy after beating Hans-Joachim Stuck, Marc Duez and Stig Blomqvist.

== Participants ==
Team	Drivers	2011 series
(United Kingdom) (Portugal) All-Stars	Filipe Albuquerque	DTM
(United Kingdom) (Portugal) All-Stars	David Coulthard	DTM
France	Romain Grosjean	GP2 Series
France	Sébastien Ogier	WRC
Germany	Michael Schumacher	Formula One
Germany	Sebastian Vettel	Formula One
Germany SAT1	Timo Glock (Note: Glock and Scheider contested the Nations Cup only.)	Formula One
Germany SAT1	Timo Scheider	DTM
Germany SAT1	Martin Tomczyk (Note: Tomczyk and Ekström contested the individual event only, due to prior commitments.)	DTM
Great Britain	Jenson Button	Formula One
Great Britain	Andy Priaulx	ILMC
(Denmark) (Finland) (Sweden) Nordic	Mattias Ekström	DTM
(Denmark) (Finland) (Sweden) Nordic	Juho Hänninen	SWRC/IRC
(Denmark) (Finland) (Sweden) Nordic	Tom Kristensen	ILMC
(Czech Republic) (Russia) Slavic	Jan Kopecký	IRC
(Czech Republic) (Russia) Slavic	Vitaly Petrov	Formula One
United States	Brian Deegan	X Games/Lucas Oil Off Road Racing Series
United States	Travis Pastrana	X Games/K&N Pro Series East

== Cars ==
- Audi R8 LMS
- KTM X-Bow
- Euro Racecar
- ROC Car
- Škoda Fabia Super 2000
- Volkswagen Scirocco

== ROC Nations Cup ==
=== Group stage ===
==== Group A ====
Pos.	Team	Races	Wins	Losses	Driver	Wins	Losess	Best Time
1	France	6	4	2	(France) Romain Grosjean	1	2	1:12.0632
1	France	6	4	2	(France) Sébastien Ogier	3	0	1:09.9914
2	(Denmark) (Finland) Nordic	6	4	2	(Denmark) Tom Kristensen	3	0	1:10.4405
2	(Denmark) (Finland) Nordic	6	4	2	(Finland) Juho Hänninen	1	2	1:11.6632
3	Germany SAT1	6	3	3	(Germany) Timo Glock	2	1	1:12.9097
3	Germany SAT1	6	3	3	(Germany) Timo Scheider	1	2	1:12.1059
4	United States	6	1	5	(United States) Brian Deegan	0	3	1:13.0723
4	United States	6	1	5	(United States) Travis Pastrana	1	2	1:10.6946

Team 1	Time 1	Score	Team 2	Time 2	Car
(Denmark) (Finland) Nordic		1–1	France		
Tom Kristensen	1:16.5884	1–1	Romain Grosjean	1:17.0588	Volkswagen Scirocco
Juho Hänninen	1:14.9771	1–1	Sébastien Ogier	1:12.9713	Audi R8 LMS
Germany SAT1		1–1	United States		
Timo Glock	1:16.9378	1–1	Brian Deegan	1:18.3991	Volkswagen Scirocco
Timo Scheider	1:12.1211	1–1	Travis Pastrana	1:10.6946	Audi R8 LMS
France		1–1	Germany SAT1		
Romain Grosjean	1:15.8436	1–1	Timo Glock	1:14.2690	KTM X-Bow
Sébastien Ogier	1:09.9914	1–1	Timo Scheider	1:12.1059	Škoda Fabia Super 2000

Team 1	Time 1	Score	Team 2	Time 2	Car
(Denmark) (Finland) Nordic		2–0	United States		
Tom Kristensen	1:12.8327	2–0	Brian Deegan	1:14.8702	KTM X-Bow
Juho Hänninen	1:11.6632	2–0	Travis Pastrana	1:29.4666	Škoda Fabia Super 2000
(Denmark) (Finland) Nordic		1–1	Germany SAT1		
Tom Kristensen	1:10.4405	1–1	Timo Glock	1:12.9097	Audi R8 LMS
Juho Hänninen	1:16.5077	1–1	Timo Scheider	1:14.7799	Volkswagen Scirocco
France		2–0	United States		
Romain Grosjean	1:12.0632	2–0	Brian Deegan	1:13.0723	Audi R8 LMS
Sébastien Ogier	1:14.3233	2–0	Travis Pastrana	1:19.9126	Volkswagen Scirocco

==== Group B ====
Pos.	Team	Races	Wins	Losses	Driver	Wins	Losess	Best Time
1	(United Kingdom) Great Britain	6	5	1	(United Kingdom) Jenson Button	2	1	1:11.6601
1	(United Kingdom) Great Britain	6	5	1	(United Kingdom) Andy Priaulx	3	0	1:10.5006
2	Germany	6	4	2	(Germany) Michael Schumacher	2	1	1:12.9835
2	Germany	6	4	2	(Germany) Sebastian Vettel	2	1	1:10.6851
3	(Russia) (Czech Republic) Slavic	6	2	4	(Russia) Vitaly Petrov	1	2	1:13.0918
3	(Russia) (Czech Republic) Slavic	6	2	4	(Czech Republic) Jan Kopecký	1	2	1:09.5144
4	(Portugal) (United Kingdom) All-Stars	6	1	5	(United Kingdom) David Coulthard	1	2	1:12.4928
4	(Portugal) (United Kingdom) All-Stars	6	1	5	(Portugal) Filipe Albuquerque	0	3	1:11.2336

Team 1	Time 1	Score	Team 2	Time 2	Car
Germany		1–1	(Russia) (Czech Republic) Slavic		
Michael Schumacher	1:13.1435	1–1	Vitaly Petrov	1:13.0918	KTM X-Bow
Sebastian Vettel	1:13.3434	1–1	Jan Kopecký	1:16.1457	ROC Car
(United Kingdom) Great Britain		2–0	(Portugal) (United Kingdom) All-Stars		
Jenson Button	1:11.6601	2–0	David Coulthard	1:12.4928	KTM X-Bow
Andy Priaulx	1:14.7883	2–0	Filipe Albuquerque	1:15.6407	ROC Car
Germany		2–0	(Portugal) (United Kingdom) All-Stars		
Michael Schumacher	1:13.1089	2–0	David Coulthard	1:18.8168	ROC Car
Sebastian Vettel	1:11.7671	2–0	Filipe Albuquerque	1:12.7079	KTM X-Bow

Team 1	Time 1	Score	Team 2	Time 2	Car
(United Kingdom) Great Britain		2–0	(Russia) (Czech Republic) Slavic		
Jenson Button	1:15.0996	2–0	Vitaly Petrov	1:19.1915	ROC Car
Andy Priaulx	1:12.3460	2–0	Jan Kopecký	1:13.9516	KTM X-Bow
(Russia) (Czech Republic) Slavic		1–1	(Portugal) (United Kingdom) All-Stars		
Vitaly Petrov	1:18.8736	1–1	David Coulthard	1:14.0116	Euro Racecar
Jan Kopecký	1:09.5144	1–1	Filipe Albuquerque	1:11.2336	Škoda Fabia Super 2000
Germany		1–1	(United Kingdom) Great Britain		
Michael Schumacher	1:12.9835	1–1	Jenson Button	1:13.0499	Euro Racecar
Sebastian Vettel	1:10.6851	1–1	Andy Priaulx	1:10.5006	Škoda Fabia Super 2000

=== Knockout stage ===
Semi-finals
France	0
(Denmark) (Finland) Nordic	2
(United Kingdom) Great Britain	1
Germany	2

Final
(Denmark) (Finland) Nordic	0
Germany	2

==== Semifinals ====
Team 1	Time 1	Score	Team 2	Time 2	Car
France		0–2	(Denmark) (Finland) Nordic		
Romain Grosjean	1:10.6118	0–2	Tom Kristensen	1:09.8530	Audi R8 LMS
Sébastien Ogier	1:14.9223	0–2	Juho Hänninen	1:14.8891	Volkswagen Scirocco
(United Kingdom) Great Britain		1–2	Germany		
Jenson Button	1:12.1128	1–2	Michael Schumacher	1:12.2265	Euro Racecar
Andy Priaulx	1.12.2729	1–2	Sebastian Vettel	1:11.1389	KTM X-Bow
Jenson Button	1:18.7514	1–2	Sebastian Vettel	1:11.5280	KTM X-Bow

==== Final ====
Team 1	Time 1	Score	Team 2	Time 2	Car
(Denmark) (Finland) Nordic		0–2	Germany		
Tom Kristensen	1:12.7154	0–2	Michael Schumacher	1:11.2855	KTM X-Bow
Juho Hänninen	1:19.4994	0–2	Sebastian Vettel	1:12.5290	ROC Car

== Race of Champions ==
=== Group stage ===
==== Group A ====
Pos.	Driver	Races	Wins	Losses	Best Time
1	(United Kingdom) Andy Priaulx	3	3	0	1:09.8853
2	(United Kingdom) David Coulthard	3	2	1	1:09.8525
3	(United States) Travis Pastrana	3	1	2	1:15.1233
4	(Portugal) Filipe Albuquerque	3	0	3	1:10.5414

Driver 1	Time 1	Car	Driver 2	Time 2
(United States) Travis Pastrana	1:41.3157	Audi R8 LMS	(Portugal) Filipe Albuquerque	DNF
(United Kingdom) Andy Priaulx	1:09.8853	Audi R8 LMS	(United Kingdom) David Coulthard	1:11.7524
(United Kingdom) David Coulthard	1:09.8525	Škoda Fabia Super 2000	(Portugal) Filipe Albuquerque	1:10.5414
(United Kingdom) Andy Priaulx	1:09.9662	Škoda Fabia Super 2000	(United States) Travis Pastrana	1:17.4026
(United States) Travis Pastrana	1:15.1233	KTM X-Bow	(United Kingdom) David Coulthard	1:11.3509
(United Kingdom) Andy Priaulx	1:12.1134	KTM X-Bow	(Portugal) Filipe Albuquerque	1:12.4122

==== Group B ====
Pos.	Driver	Races	Wins	Losses	Best Time
1	(Germany) Martin Tomczyk	3	2	1	1:09.2048
2	(France) Sébastien Ogier	3	2	1	1:09.2197
3	(Sweden) Mattias Ekström	3	1	2	1:07.5296
4	(Czech Republic) Jan Kopecký	3	1	2	1:09.0827

Driver 1	Time 1	Car	Driver 2	Time 2
(France) Sébastien Ogier	1:13.2524	Volkswagen Scirocco	(Sweden) Mattias Ekström	1:14.2411
(Czech Republic) Jan Kopecký	1:14.9017	Volkswagen Scirocco	(Germany) Martin Tomczyk	1:14.1390
(Czech Republic) Jan Kopecký	1:11.8838	Audi R8 LMS	(Sweden) Mattias Ekström	1:07.5296
(France) Sébastien Ogier	1:09.5628	Audi R8 LMS	(Germany) Martin Tomczyk	1:09.9397
(France) Sébastien Ogier	1:09.2197	Škoda Fabia Super 2000	(Czech Republic) Jan Kopecký	1:09.0827
(Sweden) Mattias Ekström	1:11.0352	Škoda Fabia Super 2000	(Germany) Martin Tomczyk	1:09.2048

==== Group C ====
Pos.	Driver	Races	Wins	Losses	Best Time
1	(Germany) Michael Schumacher	3	3	0	1:12.9251
2	(United Kingdom) Jenson Button	3	2	1	1:12.2013
3	(Finland) Juho Hänninen	3	1	2	1:15.1227
4	(United States) Brian Deegan	3	0	3	1:19.0525

Driver 1	Time 1	Car	Driver 2	Time 2
(United Kingdom) Jenson Button	1:12.2013	KTM X-Bow	(Finland) Juho Hänninen	1:15.1227
(Germany) Michael Schumacher	1:16.0771	KTM X-Bow	(United States) Brian Deegan	DNF
(United Kingdom) Jenson Button	1:16.1906	ROC Car	(United States) Brian Deegan	1:19.0525
(Germany) Michael Schumacher	1:13.9902	ROC Car	(Finland) Juho Hänninen	1:15.5610
(Finland) Juho Hänninen	1:17.3678	Euro Racecar	(United States) Brian Deegan	1:21.9264
(Germany) Michael Schumacher	1:12.9251	Euro Racecar	(United Kingdom) Jenson Button	1:14.0547

==== Group D ====
Pos.	Driver	Races	Wins	Losses	Best Time
1	(Denmark) Tom Kristensen	3	2	1	1:10.0113
2	(Germany) Sebastian Vettel	3	2	1	1:10.1798
3	(France) Romain Grosjean	3	2	1	1:10.6577
4	(Russia) Vitaly Petrov	3	0	3	1:11.2257

Driver 1	Time 1	Car	Driver 2	Time 2
(Germany) Sebastian Vettel	1:13.4197	Euro Racecar	(France) Romain Grosjean	1:14.6647
(Denmark) Tom Kristensen	1:11.9265	Euro Racecar	(Russia) Vitaly Petrov	1:14.4213
(Germany) Sebastian Vettel	1:10.8671	KTM X-Bow	(Russia) Vitaly Petrov	1:11.7785
(Denmark) Tom Kristensen	1:11.5341	KTM X-Bow	(France) Romain Grosjean	1:10.8356
(France) Romain Grosjean	1:10.6577	Škoda Fabia Super 2000	(Russia) Vitaly Petrov	1:11.2257
(Germany) Sebastian Vettel	1:10.1798	Škoda Fabia Super 2000	(Denmark) Tom Kristensen	1:10.0113

=== Knockout stage ===
Quarterfinals
(United Kingdom) Andy Priaulx	0
(France) Sébastien Ogier	1
(Germany) Martin Tomczyk	1
(United Kingdom) David Coulthard	0
(Germany) Michael Schumacher	1
(Germany) Sebastian Vettel	0
(Denmark) Tom Kristensen	1
(United Kingdom) Jenson Button	0

Semifinals
(France) Sébastien Ogier	1
(Germany) Martin Tomczyk	0
(Germany) Michael Schumacher	0
(Denmark) Tom Kristensen	1

Final
(France) Sébastien Ogier	2
(Denmark) Tom Kristensen	0

==== Quarterfinals ====
Driver 1	Time 1	Car	Driver 2	Time 2
(United Kingdom) Andy Priaulx	1:14.9095	Volkswagen Scirocco	(France) Sébastien Ogier	1:13.2855
(Germany) Martin Tomczyk	1:09.7112	Škoda Fabia Super 2000	(United Kingdom) David Coulthard	1:10.1287
(Germany) Michael Schumacher	1:12.4310	ROC Car	(Germany) Sebastian Vettel	1:13.8645
(Denmark) Tom Kristensen	1:10.6979	KTM X-Bow	(United Kingdom) Jenson Button	1:11.2812

==== Semifinals ====
Driver 1	Time 1	Car	Driver 2	Time 2
(France) Sébastien Ogier	1:08.2759	Audi R8 LMS	(Germany) Martin Tomczyk	1:09.5884
(Germany) Michael Schumacher	1:10.9472	KTM X-Bow	(Denmark) Tom Kristensen	1:10.9297

==== Final ====
Driver 1	Time 1	Car	Driver 2	Time 2
(France) Sébastien Ogier	1:12.9645	ROC Car	(Denmark) Tom Kristensen	1:14.2665
(France) Sébastien Ogier	1:08.1048	Audi R8 LMS	(Denmark) Tom Kristensen	1:09.6225
