= 2010 Race of Champions =

Motor racing competition

Seasons
- ← 2009 2011 →

Layout of 2010 Race of Champions

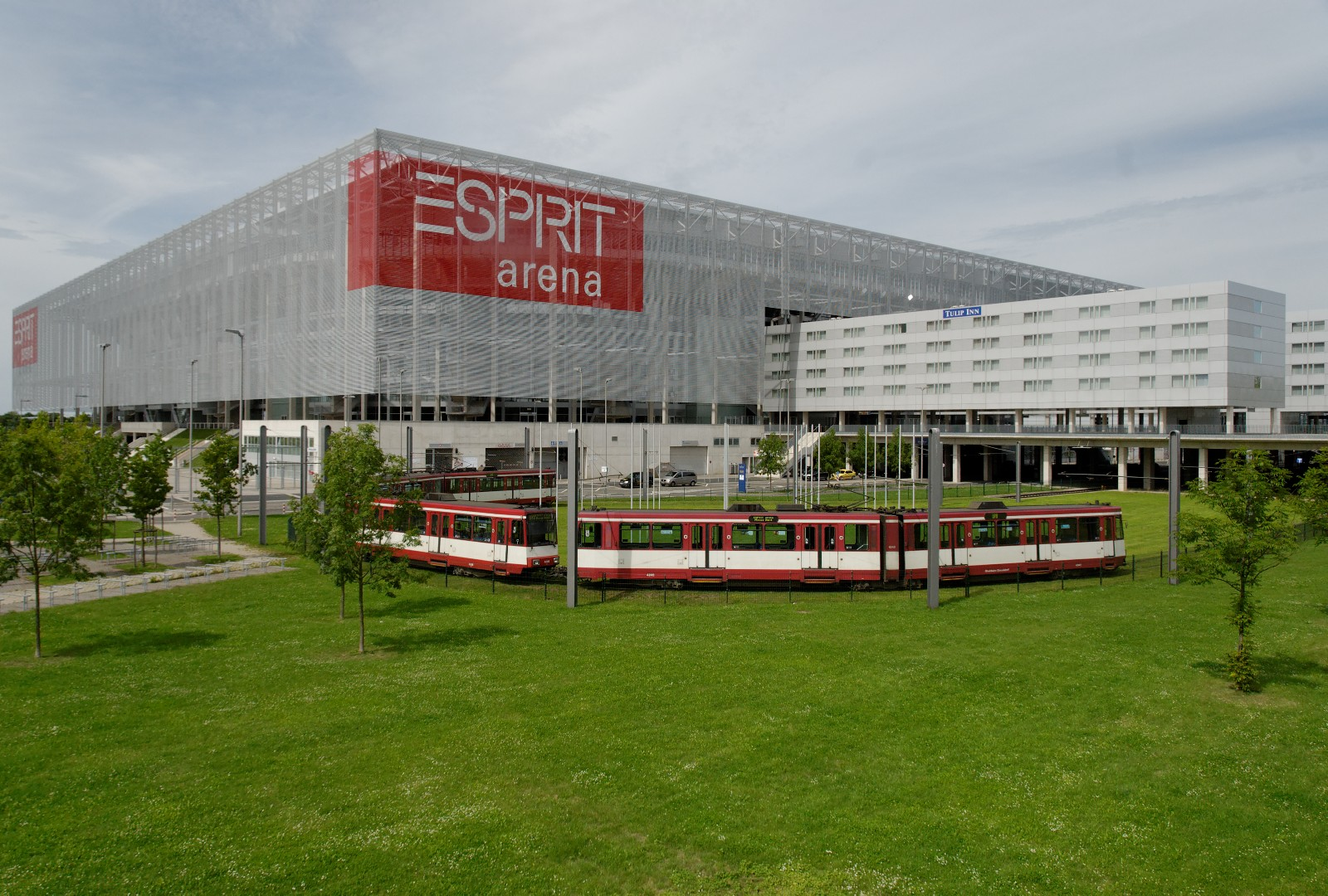
The Esprit Arena, the venue for the 2010 Race of Champions.

The 2010 Race of Champions was the 23rd running of the event, and took place over 27–28 November 2010 at the Esprit Arena in Düsseldorf, Germany. It was the first time the event had been held in Germany since 1989, when it was held at the Nürburgring.

Team Germany won a fourth consecutive Nations Cup with Michael Schumacher and Sebastian Vettel defeating Team Britain's Andy Priaulx and Jason Plato 2–1 in the final. In the driver-by-driver Race of Champions itself, Portugal's Filipe Albuquerque defeated multiple World Rally Champion Sébastien Loeb 2–1 in the final.

== Participants ==
Country	Drivers	2010 series
(Australia) (United States) All-Stars	Mick Doohan	Ex FIM Road Racing
(Australia) (United States) All-Stars	Tanner Foust	X Games / Rally America
Benelux	Bertrand Baguette	IndyCar Series
Benelux	Jeroen Bleekemolen	ALMS & Porsche Supercup
France	Sébastien Loeb	WRC
France	Alain Prost	Andros Trophy / Ex Formula One
Germany	Michael Schumacher	Formula One
Germany	Sebastian Vettel	Formula One
Great Britain	Jason Plato	BTCC
Great Britain	Andy Priaulx	WTCC
(Finland) (Denmark) Nordic	Heikki Kovalainen	Formula One
(Finland) (Denmark) Nordic	Tom Kristensen	Le Mans Series
Portugal	Filipe Albuquerque	Italian GT & Superstars Series
Portugal	Álvaro Parente	Superleague Formula & Spanish GT
United States	Carl Edwards	NASCAR
United States	Travis Pastrana	X Games / Rally America

== Cars ==
- Audi R8 LMS
- KTM X-Bow
- Porsche 911 GT3 Cup
- Euro Racecar
- ROC 2-seater
- ROC Car
- RX Racing RX150
- Solution F Prototype
- Volkswagen Scirocco

== ROC Nations Cup ==
=== Group stage ===
==== Group A ====
Pos.	Team	Races	Wins	Losses	Best Team Time	Driver	Wins	Losses	Best Time
1	(United Kingdom) Great Britain	6	4	2	2:22.3759	(United Kingdom) Jason Plato	1	2	1:11.9223
1	(United Kingdom) Great Britain	6	4	2	2:22.3759	(United Kingdom) Andy Priaulx	3	0	1:10.4536
2	France	6	3	3	2:22.1913	(France) Alain Prost	1	2	1:11.8307
2	France	6	3	3	2:22.1913	(France) Sébastien Loeb	2	1	1:10.3606
3	(Finland) (Denmark) Nordic	6	3	3	2:23.2136	(Finland) Heikki Kovalainen	3	0	1:10.9713
3	(Finland) (Denmark) Nordic	6	3	3	2:23.2136	(Denmark) Tom Kristensen	0	3	1:12.2423
4	Portugal	6	2	4	2:23.7699	(Portugal) Álvaro Parente	1	2	1:10.8405
4	Portugal	6	2	4	2:23.7699	(Portugal) Filipe Albuquerque	1	2	1:12.9294

Team 1	Time 1	Score	Team 2	Time 2	Car
France		1–1	(Finland) (Denmark) Nordic		
Alain Prost	1:11.8307	1–1	Heikki Kovalainen	1:10.9713	Solution F Prototype
Sébastien Loeb	1:10.3606	1–1	Tom Kristensen	1:12.2423	Porsche 911 GT3 Cup
(United Kingdom) Great Britain		1–1	Portugal		
Jason Plato	1:11.9223	1–1	Álvaro Parente	1:10.8405	Solution F Prototype
Andy Priaulx	1:10.4536	1–1	Filipe Albuquerque	1:12.9294	Porsche 911 GT3 Cup
France		0–2	(United Kingdom) Great Britain		
Alain Prost	1:18.1618	0–2	Jason Plato	1:15.6128	Volkswagen Scirocco
Sébastien Loeb	1:15.7884	0–2	Andy Priaulx	1:13.8095	Euro Racecar

Team 1	Time 1	Score	Team 2	Time 2	Car
(Finland) (Denmark) Nordic		1–1	Portugal		
Heikki Kovalainen	1:14.7066	1–1	Álvaro Parente	1:15.6223	Volkswagen Scirocco
Tom Kristensen	1:13.4820	1–1	Filipe Albuquerque	1:13.1479	Euro Racecar
France		2–0	Portugal		
Alain Prost	1:14.0018	2–0	Álvaro Parente	DNF	KTM X-Bow
Sébastien Loeb	1:13.5254	2–0	Filipe Albuquerque	1:14.3921	Audi R8 LMS
(Finland) (Denmark) Nordic		1–1	(United Kingdom) Great Britain		
Heikki Kovalainen	1:11.6949	1–1	Jason Plato	1:12.7642	KTM X-Bow
Tom Kristensen	1:14.0499	1–1	Andy Priaulx	1:12.9157	Audi R8 LMS

==== Group B ====
Pos.	Team	Races	Wins	Losses	Best Team Time	Driver	Wins	Losses	Best Time
1	Benelux	6	4	2	2:26.0601	(Belgium) Bertrand Baguette	3	0	1:12.8820
1	Benelux	6	4	2	2:26.0601	(Netherlands) Jeroen Bleekemolen	1	2	1:13.1781
2	Germany	6	3	3	2:24.8746	(Germany) Michael Schumacher	2	1	1:12.8815
2	Germany	6	3	3	2:24.8746	(Germany) Sebastian Vettel	1	2	1:11.9931
3	(Australia) (United States) All-Stars	6	3	3	2:25.5769	(Australia) Mick Doohan	1	2	1:13.7260
3	(Australia) (United States) All-Stars	6	3	3	2:25.5769	(United States) Tanner Foust	2	1	1:11.8509
4	United States	6	2	4	2:26.2579	(United States) Carl Edwards	0	3	1:14.4291
4	United States	6	2	4	2:26.2579	(United States) Travis Pastrana	2	1	1:11.8288

Team 1	Time 1	Score	Team 2	Time 2	Car
Germany		1–1	United States		
Michael Schumacher	1:13.2931	1–1	Carl Edwards	1:16.1596	ROC Car
Sebastian Vettel	1:14.5010	1–1	Travis Pastrana	1:14.3588	Volkswagen Scirocco
(Australia) (United States) All-Stars		0–2	Benelux		
Mick Doohan	1:15.4307	0–2	Bertrand Baguette	1:14.6927	ROC Car
Tanner Foust	1:15.3806	0–2	Jeroen Bleekemolen	1:15.3400	Volkswagen Scirocco
Germany		1–1	Benelux		
Michael Schumacher	1:14.6622	1–1	Bertrand Baguette	1:12.8820	RX Racing RX150
Sebastian Vettel	1:13.2710	1–1	Jeroen Bleekemolen	1:14.8923	ROC Car

Team 1	Time 1	Score	Team 2	Time 2	Car
(Australia) (United States) All-Stars		2–0	United States		
Mick Doohan	1:13.7260	2–0	Carl Edwards	1:14.4291	RX Racing RX150
Tanner Foust	1:15.4174	2–0	Travis Pastrana	1:17.0747	ROC Car
Germany		1–1	(Australia) (United States) All-Stars		
Michael Schumacher	1:12.8815	1–1	Mick Doohan	1:15.4533	KTM X-Bow
Sebastian Vettel	1:11.9931	1–1	Tanner Foust	1:11.8509	Audi R8 LMS
United States		1–1	Benelux		
Carl Edwards	1:14.9945	1–1	Bertrand Baguette	1:13.5070	KTM X-Bow
Travis Pastrana	1:11.8288	1–1	Jeroen Bleekemolen	1:13.1781	Audi R8 LMS

=== Knockout stage ===
Semi-finals
(United Kingdom) Great Britain	2
France	0
Benelux	0
Germany	2

Final
(United Kingdom) Great Britain	1
Germany	2

==== Semifinals ====
Team 1	Time 1	Score	Team 2	Time 2	Car
(United Kingdom) Great Britain		2–0	France		
Jason Plato	1:15.0992	2–0	Alain Prost	1:17.0332	Volkswagen Scirocco
Andy Priaulx	1:09.3941	2–0	Sébastien Loeb	1:10.0525	Porsche 911 GT3 Cup
Benelux		0–2	Germany		
Bertrand Baguette	1:15.0526	0–2	Michael Schumacher	1:13.4447	ROC Car
Jeroen Bleekemolen	1:14.0886	0–2	Sebastian Vettel	1:11.9271	KTM X-Bow

==== Final ====
Team 1	Time 1	Score	Team 2	Time 2	Car
(United Kingdom) Great Britain		1–2	Germany		
Jason Plato	1:13.4243	1–2	Michael Schumacher	1:11.5572	KTM X-Bow
Andy Priaulx	1:14.0864	1–2	Sebastian Vettel	1:14.5001	Audi R8 LMS
Andy Priaulx	1:12.8034	1–2	Michael Schumacher	1:12.1788	ROC Car

== Race of Champions ==
=== Group stage ===
==== Group A ====
Pos	Team	Races	Wins	Losses	Best Time
1	(France) Sébastien Loeb	3	3	0	1:09.6723
2	(Belgium) Bertrand Baguette	3	2	1	1:11.2396
3	(Netherlands) Jeroen Bleekemolen	3	1	2	1:14.6367
4	(Finland) Heikki Kovalainen	3	0	3	1:10.7743

Driver 1	Time 1	Car	Driver 2	Time 2
(France) Sébastien Loeb	1:10.6248	Audi R8 LMS	(Finland) Heikki Kovalainen	1:10.7743
(Belgium) Bertrand Baguette	1:14.1540	Audi R8 LMS	(Netherlands) Jeroen Bleekemolen	1:14.6367
(France) Sébastien Loeb	1:09.6723	Porsche 911 GT3 Cup	(Belgium) Bertrand Baguette	1:11.2396
(Finland) Heikki Kovalainen	Withdrew	Porsche 911 GT3 Cup	(Netherlands) Jeroen Bleekemolen	Bye
(France) Sébastien Loeb	1:14.1456	KTM X-Bow	(Netherlands) Jeroen Bleekemolen	1:15.6355
(Finland) Heikki Kovalainen	Withdrew	KTM X-Bow	(Belgium) Bertrand Baguette	Bye

==== Group B ====
Pos	Team	Races	Wins	Losses	Best Time
1	(United Kingdom) Andy Priaulx	3	3	0	1:12.0706
2	(Denmark) Tom Kristensen	3	2	1	1:13.2770
3	(Australia) Mick Doohan	3	1	2	1:14.5662
4	(United States) Travis Pastrana	3	0	3	1:13.3010

Driver 1	Time 1	Car	Driver 2	Time 2
(Denmark) Tom Kristensen	1:13.7677	ROC Car	(United Kingdom) Andy Priaulx	1:13.5398
(Australia) Mick Doohan	1:14.5662	ROC Car	(United States) Travis Pastrana	1:22.5878
(Denmark) Tom Kristensen	1:13.2770	Euro Racecar	(United States) Travis Pastrana	1:13.3010
(United Kingdom) Andy Priaulx	1:12.0706	Euro Racecar	(Australia) Mick Doohan	1:14.9119
(Denmark) Tom Kristensen	1:19.7356	Volkswagen Scirocco	(Australia) Mick Doohan	1:28.1468
(United Kingdom) Andy Priaulx	1:15.2130	Volkswagen Scirocco	(United States) Travis Pastrana	1:20.2790

==== Group C ====
Pos	Team	Races	Wins	Losses	Best Time
1	(Portugal) Filipe Albuquerque	3	3	0	1:12.3105
2	(Germany) Sebastian Vettel	3	2	1	1:10.8390
3	(United States) Tanner Foust	3	1	2	1:13.5534
4	(United States) Carl Edwards	3	0	3	1:14.1612

Driver 1	Time 1	Car	Driver 2	Time 2
(Germany) Sebastian Vettel	1:10.8390	KTM X-Bow	(United States) Carl Edwards	1:16.6754
(United States) Tanner Foust	1:23.3822	KTM X-Bow	(Portugal) Filipe Albuquerque	1:12.3105
(Germany) Sebastian Vettel	1:11.5282	ROC Car	(United States) Tanner Foust	1:13.8784
(United States) Carl Edwards	1:14.1612	ROC Car	(Portugal) Filipe Albuquerque	1:13.3267
(Germany) Sebastian Vettel	1:18.3874	Audi R8 LMS	(Portugal) Filipe Albuquerque	1:18.1602
(United States) Tanner Foust	1:13.5534	Audi R8 LMS	(United States) Carl Edwards	1:15.6288

==== Group D ====
Pos	Team	Races	Wins	Losses	Best Time
1	(Germany) Michael Schumacher	3	3	0	1:11.5972
2	(Portugal) Álvaro Parente	3	2	1	1:13.2014
3	(France) Alain Prost	3	1	2	1:12.9327
4	(United Kingdom) Jason Plato	3	0	3	1:13.6447

Driver 1	Time 1	Car	Driver 2	Time 2
(Germany) Michael Schumacher	1:11.6091	ROC Car	(France) Alain Prost	1:12.9327
(United Kingdom) Jason Plato	1:13.6447	ROC Car	(Portugal) Álvaro Parente	1:13.2014
(Germany) Michael Schumacher	1:11.5972	RX Racing RX150	(Portugal) Álvaro Parente	DNF
(France) Alain Prost	1:16.2842	RX Racing RX150	(United Kingdom) Jason Plato	1:17.4685
(Germany) Michael Schumacher	1:16.6905	KTM X-Bow	(United Kingdom) Jason Plato	1:17.6316
(France) Alain Prost	1:32.9223	KTM X-Bow	(Portugal) Álvaro Parente	1:20.5168

=== Knockout stage ===
Quarterfinals
(France) Sébastien Loeb	1
(Denmark) Tom Kristensen	0
(United Kingdom) Andy Priaulx	1
(Belgium) Bertrand Baguette	0
(Portugal) Filipe Albuquerque	1
(Portugal) Álvaro Parente	0
(Germany) Michael Schumacher	0
(Germany) Sebastian Vettel	1

Semifinals
(France) Sébastien Loeb	1
(United Kingdom) Andy Priaulx	0
(Portugal) Filipe Albuquerque	1
(Germany) Sebastian Vettel	0

Final
(France) Sébastien Loeb	1
(Portugal) Filipe Albuquerque	2

==== Quarterfinals ====
Driver 1	Time 1	Car	Driver 2	Time 2
(France) Sébastien Loeb	1:14.7092	ROC Car	(Denmark) Tom Kristensen	1:14.8440
(United Kingdom) Andy Priaulx	1:11.5151	Porsche 911 GT3 Cup	(Belgium) Bertrand Baguette	1:12.7099
(Portugal) Filipe Albuquerque	1:13.2381	ROC Car	(Portugal) Álvaro Parente	1:13.5935
(Germany) Michael Schumacher	1:11.8648	KTM X-Bow	(Germany) Sebastian Vettel	1:11.2882

==== Semifinals ====
Driver 1	Time 1	Car	Driver 2	Time 2
(France) Sébastien Loeb	1:09.4713	Audi R8 LMS	(United Kingdom) Andy Priaulx	1:10.6438
(Portugal) Filipe Albuquerque	1:11.2094	KTM X-Bow	(Germany) Sebastian Vettel	1:11.3340

==== Final ====
Driver 1	Time 1	Car	Driver 2	Time 2
(France) Sébastien Loeb	1:12.6783	ROC Car	(Portugal) Filipe Albuquerque	1:12.5643
(France) Sébastien Loeb	1:11.4592	KTM X-Bow	(Portugal) Filipe Albuquerque	1:11.4827
(France) Sébastien Loeb	1:12.2498	ROC Car	(Portugal) Filipe Albuquerque	1:12.0671
