= Volkswagen Scirocco =

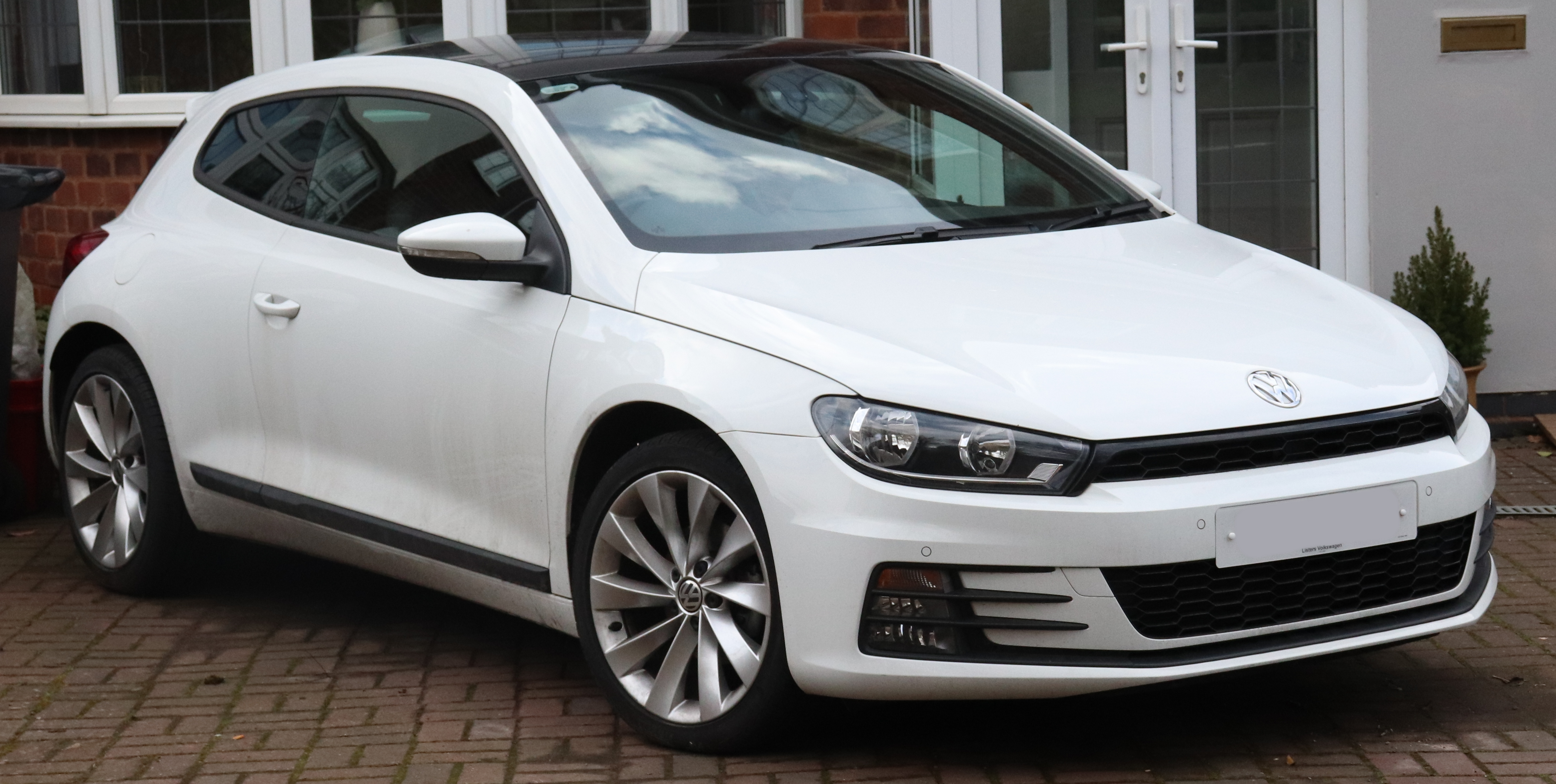
- Third generation 2015 Volkswagen Scirocco

Overview
- Manufacturer: Volkswagen
- Production: 1974–1992; 2008–2018

Body and chassis
- Class: Sport compact
- Body style: 3-door hatchback
- Layout: Front-engine, front-wheel-drive

The Volkswagen Scirocco is a sport compact car manufactured and marketed by Volkswagen in two generations from 1974 to 1992 and a third generation from 2008 until 2018. Production of the third generation ended without a successor. It is a three-door hatchback with a front-engine, front-wheel-drive layout. The Scirocco derives its name from the Mediterranean wind.

== First generation (1974) ==
First generation (Typ 53)
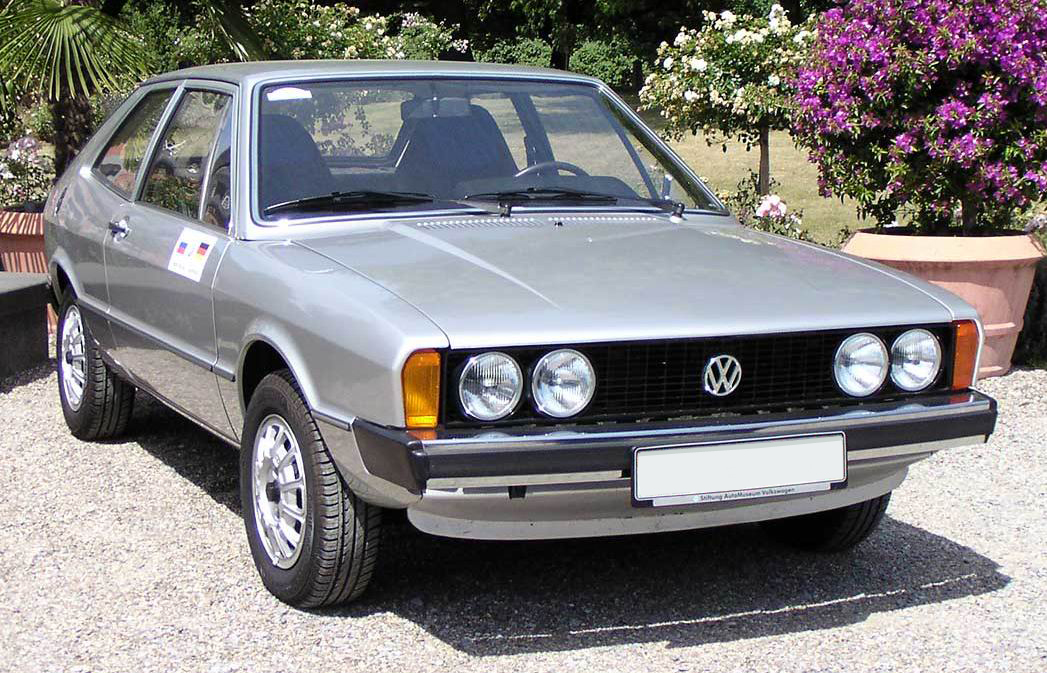

Overview
- Production: 1974–1981; 504,153 units
- Assembly: West Germany: Osnabrück (Karmann)
- Designer: Giorgetto Giugiaro at Italdesign

Body and chassis
- Platform: Volkswagen Group A1 platform
- Related: Volkswagen Golf; Volkswagen Jetta

Powertrain
- Engine: Petrol: 1,093 cc EA111 I4; 1,272 cc EA111 I4; 1,457 cc EA827 I4; 1,471 cc EA827 I4; 1,588 cc EA827 I4; 1,715 cc EA827 I4 (US only)
- Transmission: 4/5-speed manual 3-speed automatic

Dimensions
- Wheelbase: 2,400 mm (94.5 in)
- Length: 3,880 mm (152.8 in)
- Width: 1,625 mm (64.0 in)
- Height: 1,310 mm (51.6 in)
- Curb weight: 750–875 kg (1,653.5–1,929.0 lb) (European and Japanese specification)

Chronology
- Predecessor: Volkswagen Karmann Ghia

Volkswagen began work on the car during the early 1970s as the replacement for the aging Karmann Ghia coupe, and designated it the Typ 53 internally. Although the platform of the Golf was used to underpin the new Scirocco, almost every part of the car was re-engineered in favour of a new styling (penned by Giorgetto Giugiaro) which was sleeker and sportier than that of the Golf.

Scirocco prototype of Italdesign

The Scirocco debuted at the 1973 Geneva Motor Show.

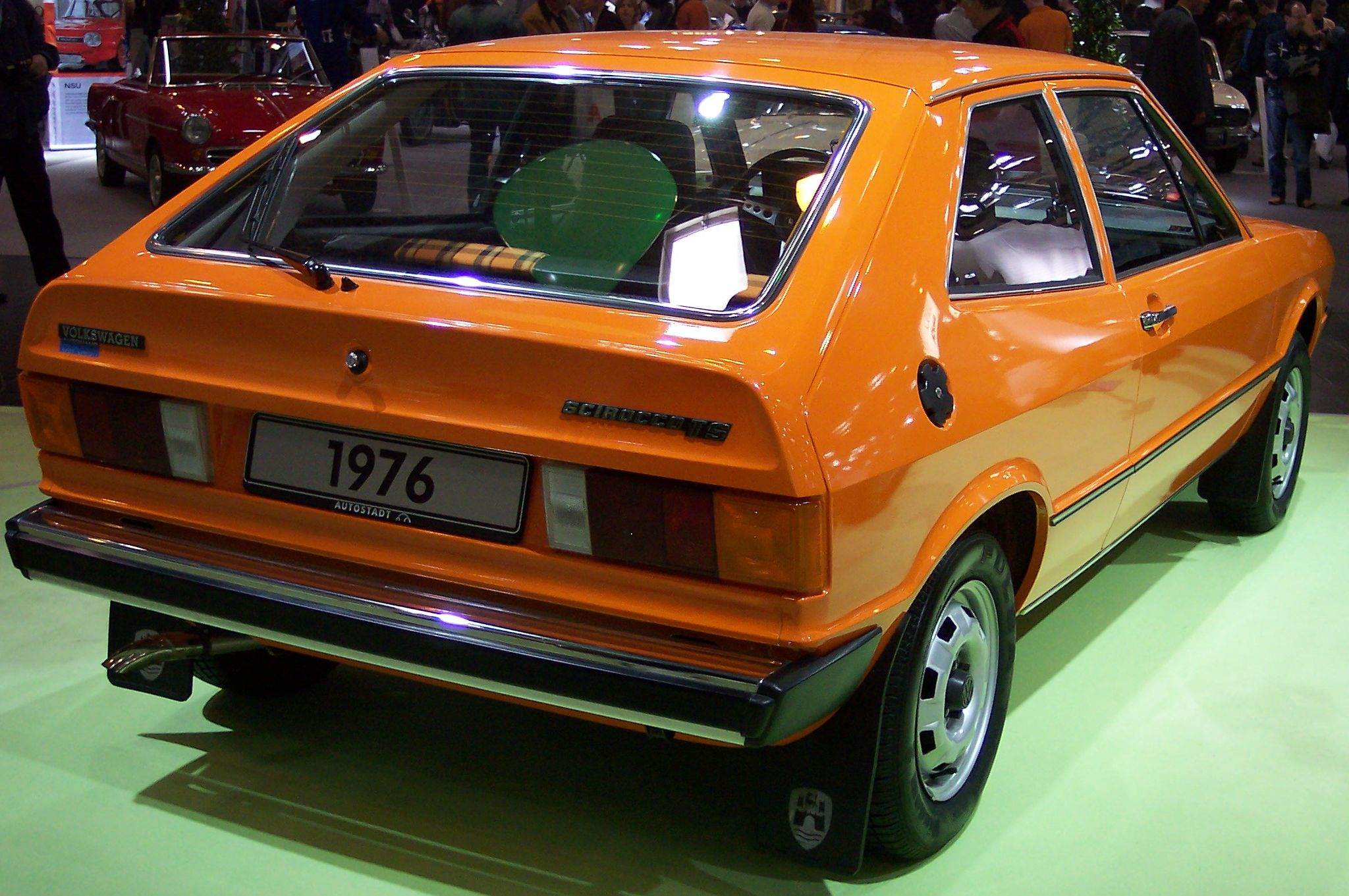
Rear view of a pre-facelift model

Launched six months before the Golf, in order to resolve any teething troubles before production of the high volume hatchback started, the Scirocco went on sale in Europe in 1974 and in North America in 1975. Type 1 models featured a range of four-cylinder engines with displacements from 1.1 to 1.6 litres, with a 1.7 also offered in North America, all featuring a single-overhead camshaft and two valves per cylinder.

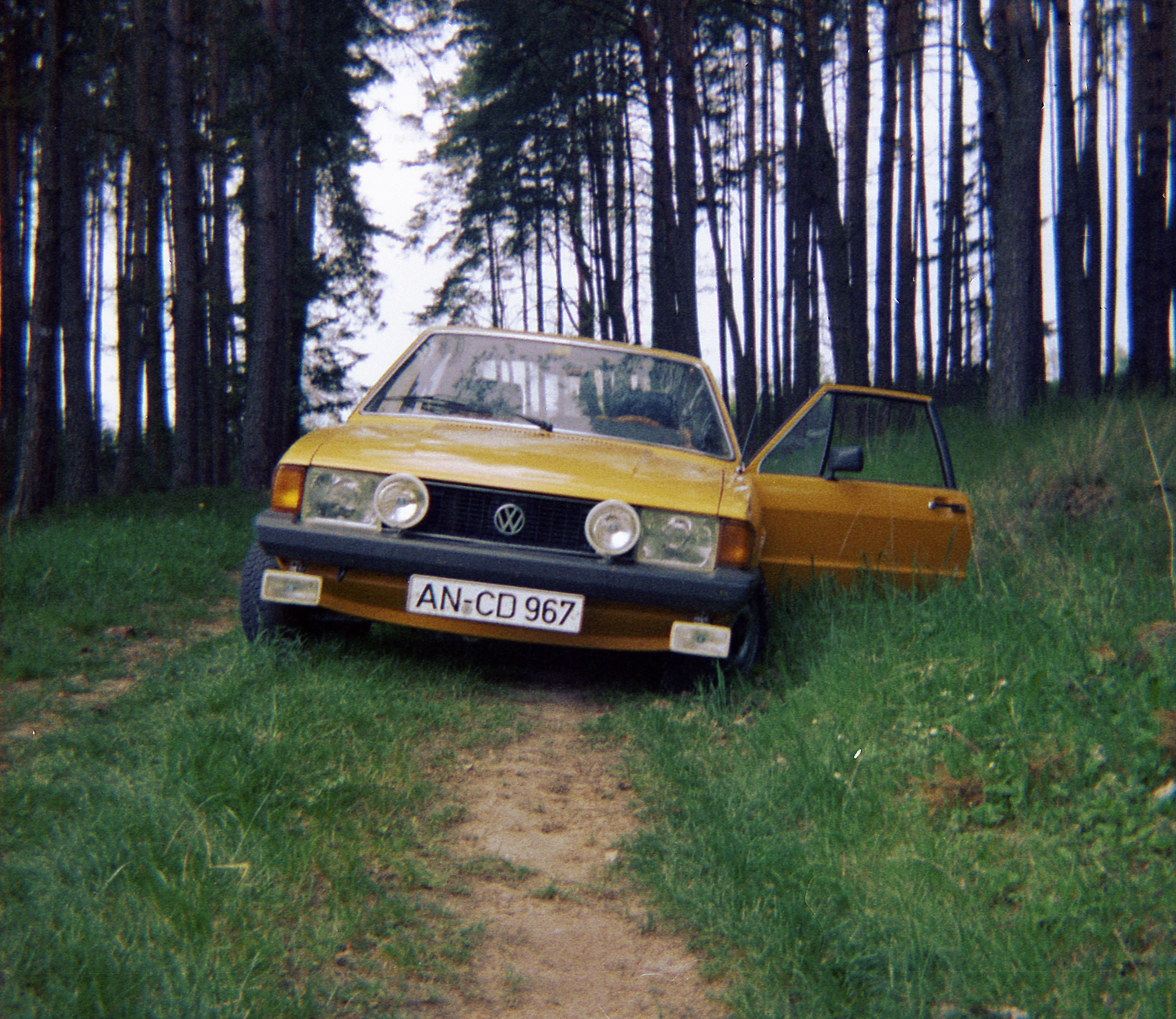
Rare lower model (L and S trims) European market Scirocco with rectangular headlights

The design of the vehicle combined with the lack of D.O.T.-approved rectangular headlights, made it necessary to have four round headlights, two for low beam use, and all four for high beam use for all the cars imported to the US. Many European owners of Scirocco with smaller engines replaced the two rectangular headlights with four round headlights to eliminate the differentiation between smaller and less powerful engines and larger and more powerful ones. However, the European "TS" version, for which maximum power was listed as 85 PS (63 kW; 84 hp), was easily distinguishable from the less powerful "L" and "S" (50 and 70 PS) versions which came with just two rectangular headlights. An automatic transmission option was added in January 1975. Automatic transmission-equipped Sciroccos were generally rare outside North America.

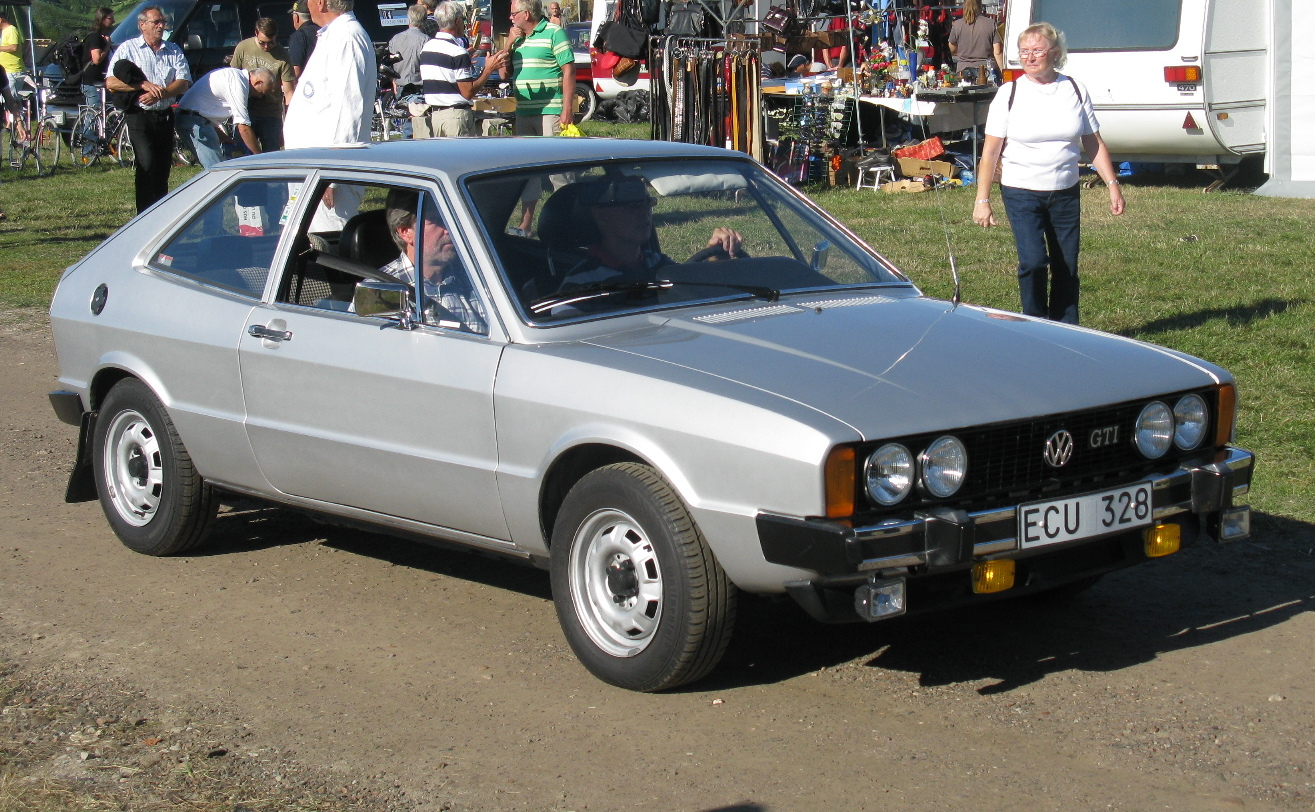
1976 Scirocco GTi

The Scirocco GTi entered production in the summer of 1976, while the later cult Golf GTI was not unveiled until the autumn of the same year. Its high-revving, 81 kW (109 hp) 1.6-litre engine featured mechanical fuel injection, 175/70HR13 tires on 5.5Jx13 wheels, a larger duckbill style front spoiler, a red frame for the grille, and the standard car's solid front brake discs were replaced with 239 mm (9.4 in) ventilated discs. Anti-roll bars were also fitted front and rear.

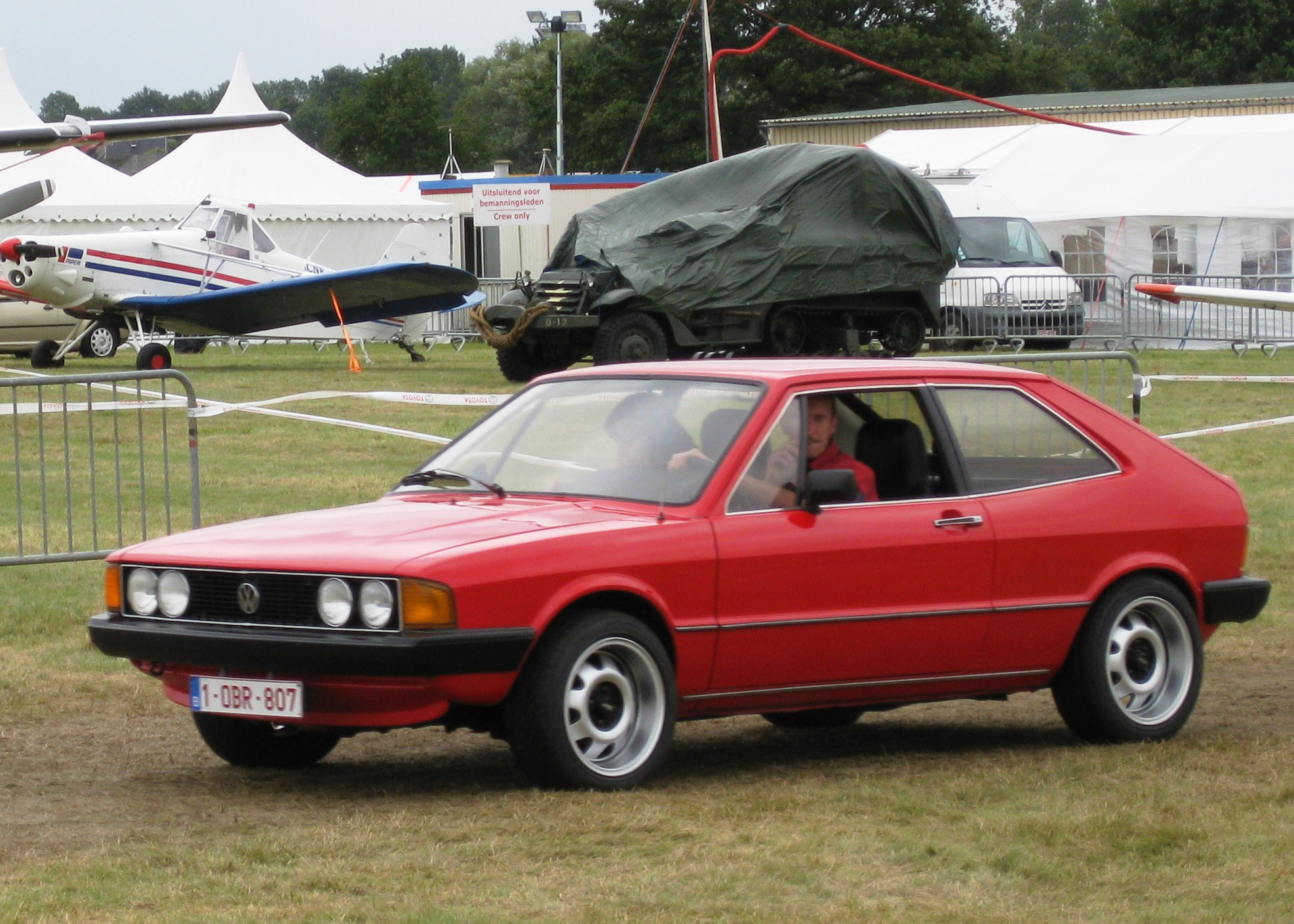
Scirocco I side view: wrap-around front indicators and the plastic-coated one-piece wrap-around bumpers mark this out as a post 1978 car

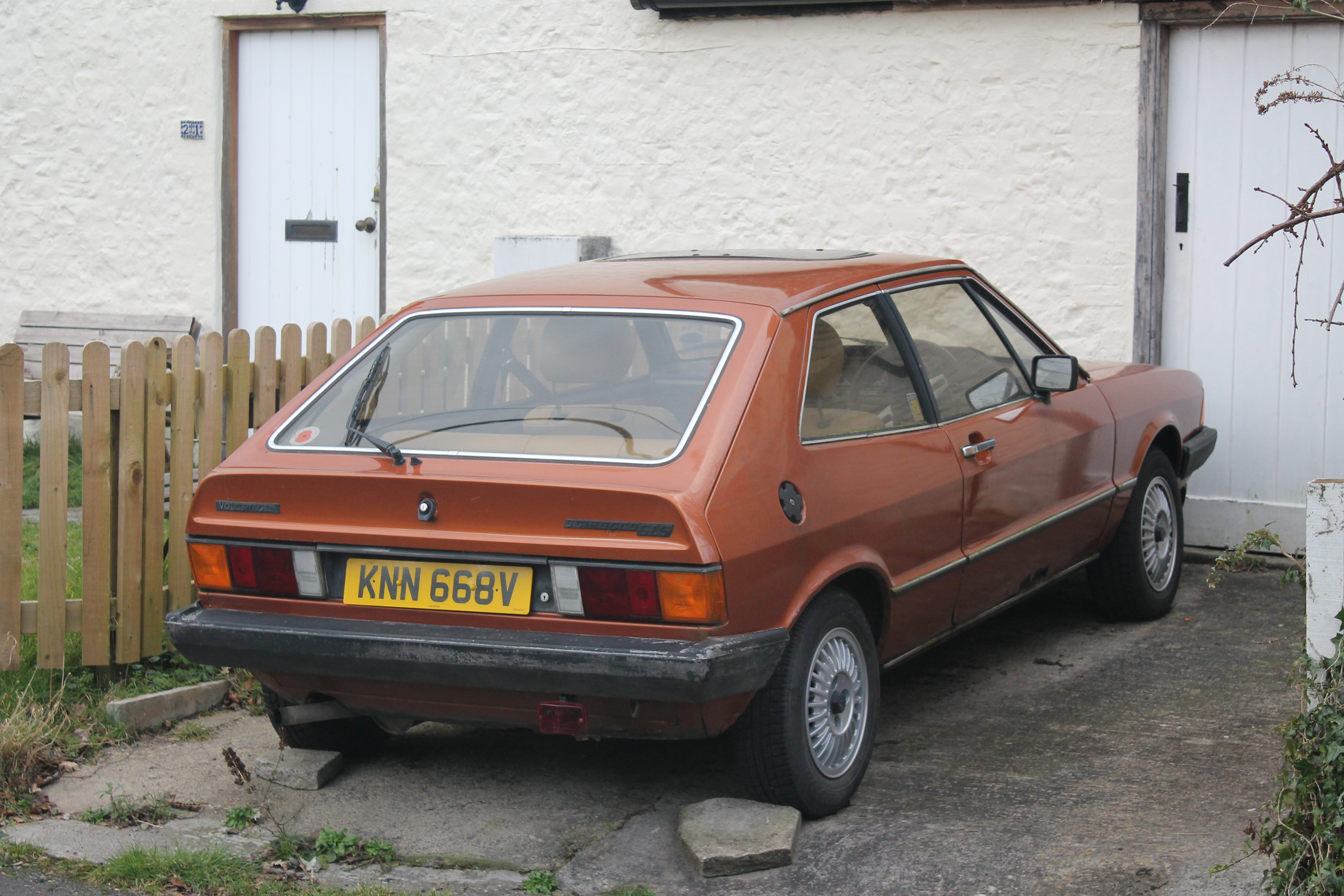
Rear view of facelift model

During the production of the "Type 53", there were subtle changes to the body and trim. On cars produced after the summer break in August 1975 (for the 1976 model year), the conventional two wiper system changed to a single wiper which parks on the passenger side of the windscreen, while the driver also benefited from improved, lighter, steering linkage. However, air conditioning became available as an option on the domestic market in August 1975. The possibility to retrofit the installation, together with a larger battery, was offered to existing owners. In August 1977 (for model year 1978) the separate front side marker and turn signal, changed to a combination wrap-around orange lens. At the same time, behind the doors the B-pillar colour changed from body colour to black, which was thought to give the car a more pleasing profile. Other mid-life changes include the move from chrome bumpers with rubberised end caps to a plastic-coated one-piece wrap around bumper. In 1979, the one-piece "flag" style outside mirrors transitioned to a two-piece shrouded mirror. The car changed little before being replaced by the second generation in March 1981 (Europe).

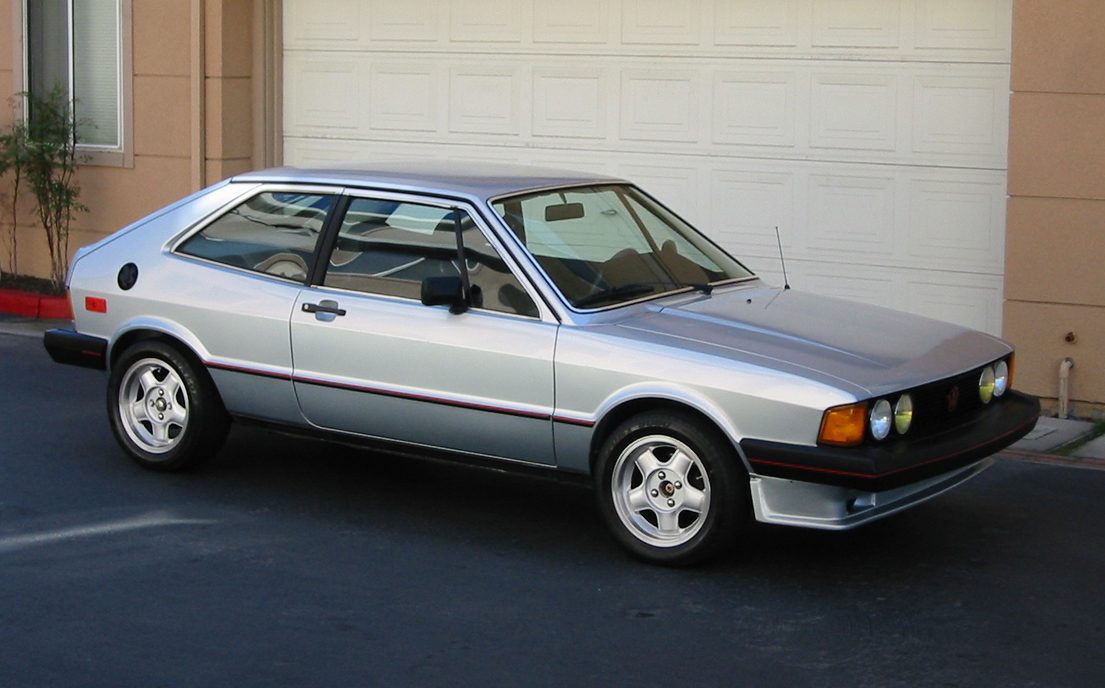

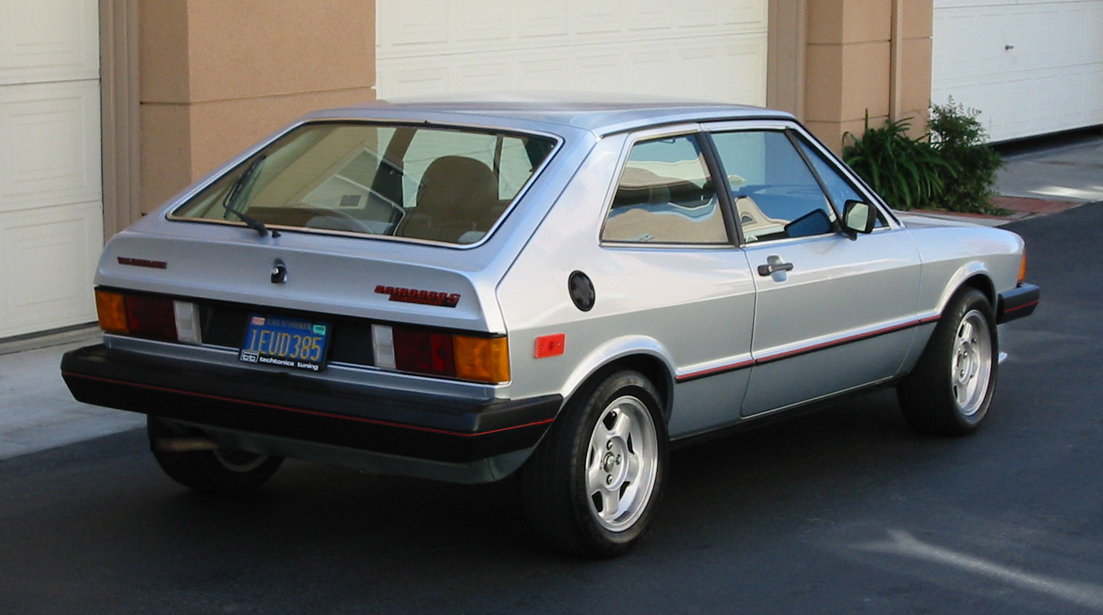
North American market Scirocco S

There were also special variants throughout the Type 1 production. Most distinguishable by paint schemes and trim, there were special versions called "Sidewinder", "Sidewinder II", "Champagne Edition", "Champagne Edition II" and the "S". The Champagne Edition II only came in white with black accents and a Zender front spoiler. On the NA models the 1980 "S" versions came in only three colours, Alpine White, Black and Mars Red with unique colour accents. This "S" model differed from the base model by having blacked out chrome trim, day glow additions to the exterior trim, Recaro designed sports seats, white letter tires, sport strips and a standard five-speed transmission. This was followed by the 1981 "S" versions which only came in Cosmos Silver Metallic, Cirrus Gray Metallic and Mars Red without the colour accents. Steel sunroofs were an available option on both the "S" non-"S" vehicles. Unlike the sunroofs on the second-generation Sciroccos introduced in 1982, these earlier versions only tilted open. They did not slide back but could be removed and stored in a special fabric folder and placed in the trunk hatch. Not forgetting the addition of the "Storm" models, available in two colours with a run of 250 cars in each colour.

=== Japan ===
The Scirocco was sold in Japan at Yanase dealerships that specialize in North American and European vehicles with right hand drive starting in 1976, initially offering the TS trim package with the 1.5-liter engine and a 4-speed manual transmission. In 1977, the GTE and LS were offered with the 1.5-liter engine and the fuel injection technology from Bosch. The GTE was available with either the 4-speed manual transmission or the 3-speed automatic, while the LS offered the automatic only.

=== North America ===
The 1975–1978 model year US vehicles had four-speed manual transmission; for the 1979–1980 model years, US vehicles were offered a five-speed manual transmissions as an option. In 1981, the five-speed became standard. The engine option was mostly limited to one, although it changed frequently over the years. The 1975 models had 1.5 L (1471 cc), followed by a larger 1.6 with 76 hp (57 kW) in 1976 and 1977. For 1978 Volkswagen reverted to a short-stroke 1.5 L (now of 1457 cc), stating that this made it easier to meet emissions requirements. Power dropped accordingly, down to 71 hp (53 kW) but with some fuel economy improvements. Buyers demanded otherwise and for 1979 the 1.6 L (1588 cc) was reinstated, now with power up somewhat to 78 hp (58 kW). 1981 US models had a standard 1.7 L (1,715 cc), all featuring a single-overhead camshaft and two valves per cylinder.

== Second generation (1981) ==
Second generation
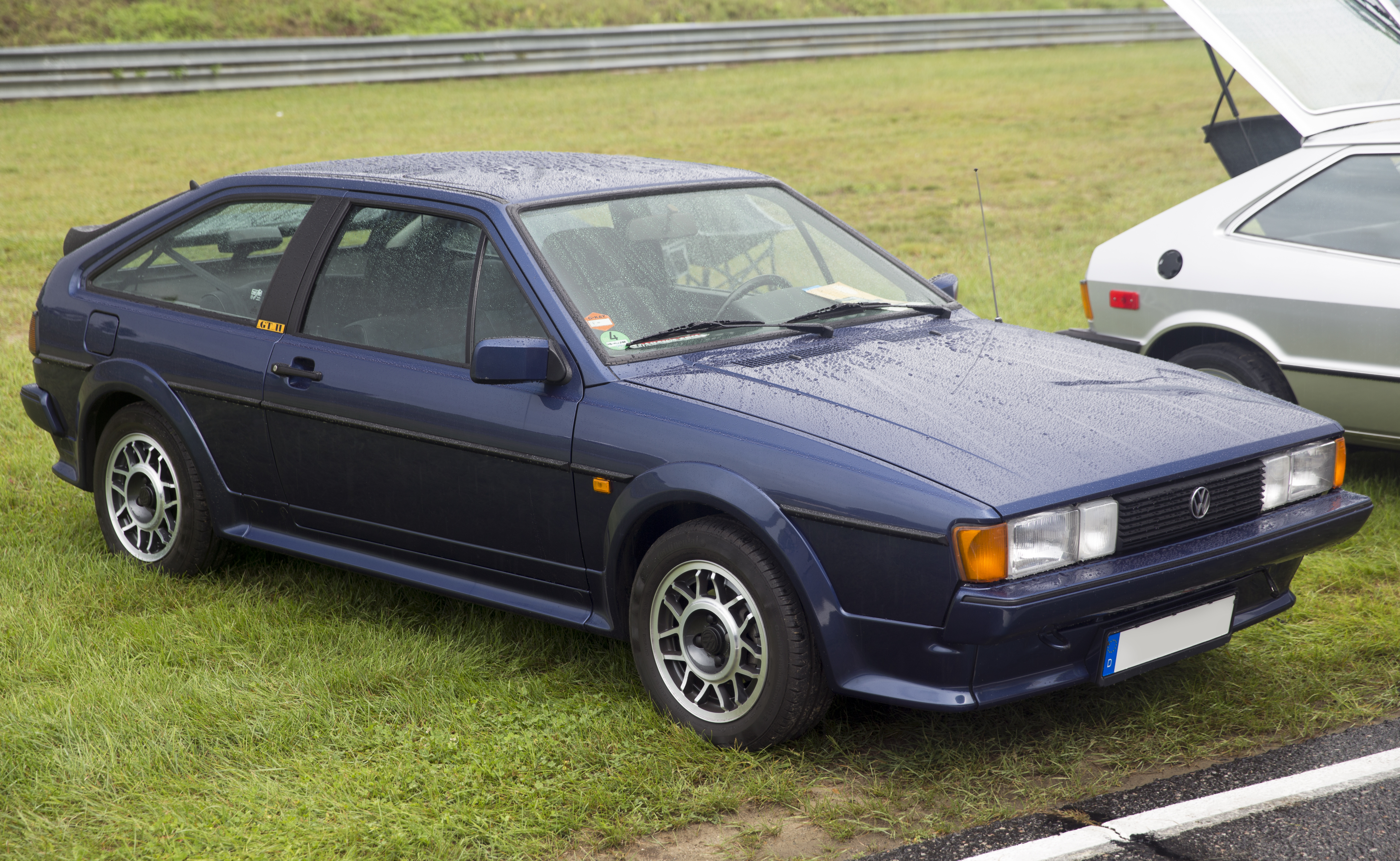

Overview
- Production: 1981–1992; 291,497 units
- Assembly: Germany: Osnabrück (Karmann)
- Designer: Herbert Schäfer

Body and chassis
- Platform: Volkswagen Group A1 platform
- Related: Volkswagen Golf; Volkswagen Jetta

Powertrain
- Engine: petrol: 1.3 L EA111 I4; 1.5 L EA827 I4; 1.6 L EA827 I4; 1.7 L EA827 I4; 1.8 L EA827 I4; 1.8 L EA827 16v I4
- Transmission: 4/5-speed manual; 3-speed automatic

Dimensions
- Wheelbase: 2,400 mm (94.5 in)
- Length: 4,210 mm (165.7 in)
- Width: 1,645 mm (64.8 in)
- Height: 1,305 mm (51.4 in)

Chronology
- Successor: Volkswagen Corrado

A heavily redesigned "Type 2" variant (internally designated Typ 53B) went on sale in 1981, although it remained on the A1 platform. The second generation Scirocco, still assembled on behalf of Volkswagen by Karmann of Osnabrück (in the same factory as the first generation Scirocco), was first shown at the 1981 Geneva Motor Show in March that year. Designed by Volkswagen's own internal design team, the new car featured increased front and rear headroom, increased luggage space and a reduction in the coefficient of drag. One feature of the Type 2 was the location of the rear spoiler midway up the glass on the rear hatch. A mid-cycle update occurred in 1984, which included minor changes over the 1982 model: removal of the outlined "SCIROCCO" script from the rear hatch (below the spoiler), a redesigned air conditioning compressor, and a different brake master cylinder with in-line proportioning valves and a brake light switch mounted to the pedal instead of on the master cylinder.

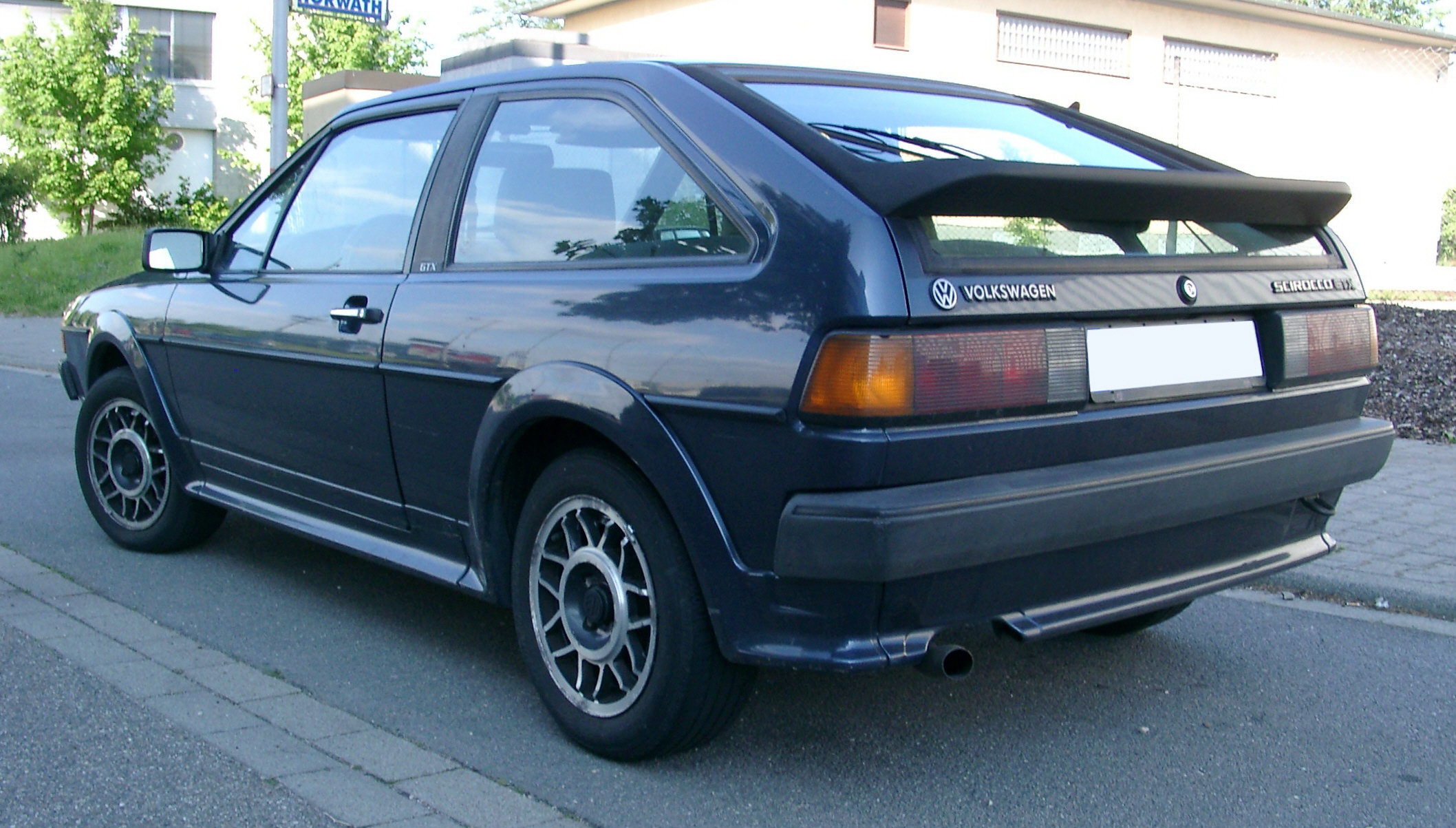
Rear view, late Scirocco GTX (Germany)

Halfway through the 1984 model year, a new space-saver spare wheel was added, that provided room for a larger fuel tank (with a second "transfer" fuel pump). Leather interior, power windows and mirrors, air conditioning, and a manual sunroof were options for all years. The 1984 model year saw the return of two windshield wipers (vs the large single wiper), absent since the 1976 models.

Eleven different engines were offered in the Type 2 Scirocco over the production run, although not all engines were available in all markets. These engines included both carburetor and fuel injection engines. Initially all models had eight-valve engines. In 1981, tuner Oettinger developed a 16-valve head, an arrangement Volkswagen also later adopted with their own multi-valve head design that debuted in a Scirocco at the 1983 Frankfurt Motor Show. It went on sale in Germany and a few other markets in July 1985, with a catalyzed model arriving in 1986. Displacements ranged from 1.3 liters up to 1.8 liters. Power ranged from 60 to 112 PS (44 to 82 kW) for the 8-valve engines and either 95 or 102 PS (70 or 75 kW) for the 16-valve engines, depending on whether or not a catalytic converter was installed.

Numerous trim levels existed, depending on the model year and market, and included the L, CL, GL, LS, GLS, GLI, GT, GTI, GTL, GTS, GTX, GT II, Scala, GT 16V and GTX 16V. There were als numerous limited edition models including the California Edition (1983, US), Storm (1984, UK), White Cat (1985, Europe), Tropic (1986, Europe), Wolfsburg Edition (1983–1985, US and Canada), and Slegato (1988, Canada). These special variants typically featured unique interior/exterior color combinations, special alloy wheels, and had special combinations of options such as leather, multifunction trip computer and/or power windows as standard.

Scirocco sales continued until 1992 in Germany, the UK, and some other European markets. The Scirocco was briefly joined but effectively replaced by the Corrado in the VW line-up, although this had been on sale since 1988 and was aimed further upmarket.

The Scirocco continued to be offered to Japanese buyers, but only the GTi with the 1.8 L engine in either manual or automatic transmissions, but starting with 1986 only the automatic transmission was offered. It did continue to comply with Japanese Government dimension regulations.

=== North America ===
Specifications in North America are somewhat different from those of cars sold in the rest of the world, due to the differing safety and emissions regulations in place there. In North America, 1982 and 1983 models received a 1.7-liter engine producing 74 hp (55 kW) and 90 lb⋅ft (122 N⋅m) of torque; the engine code was EN. The 1984 models produce 90 hp (67 kW) and 100 lb⋅ft (136 N⋅m) of torque, the engine code was JH. In mid-1986, a 16-valve model was released in the United States and Canada, which included full body skirts, a larger rear spoiler, and tear-drop shaped wheel slots to distinguish it from Type 2 8-valve models. Sales continued until 1988 in the United States, 1989 in Canada, being effectively replaced in both markets by the more expensive Corrado.

== Third generation (2008) ==
Third generation
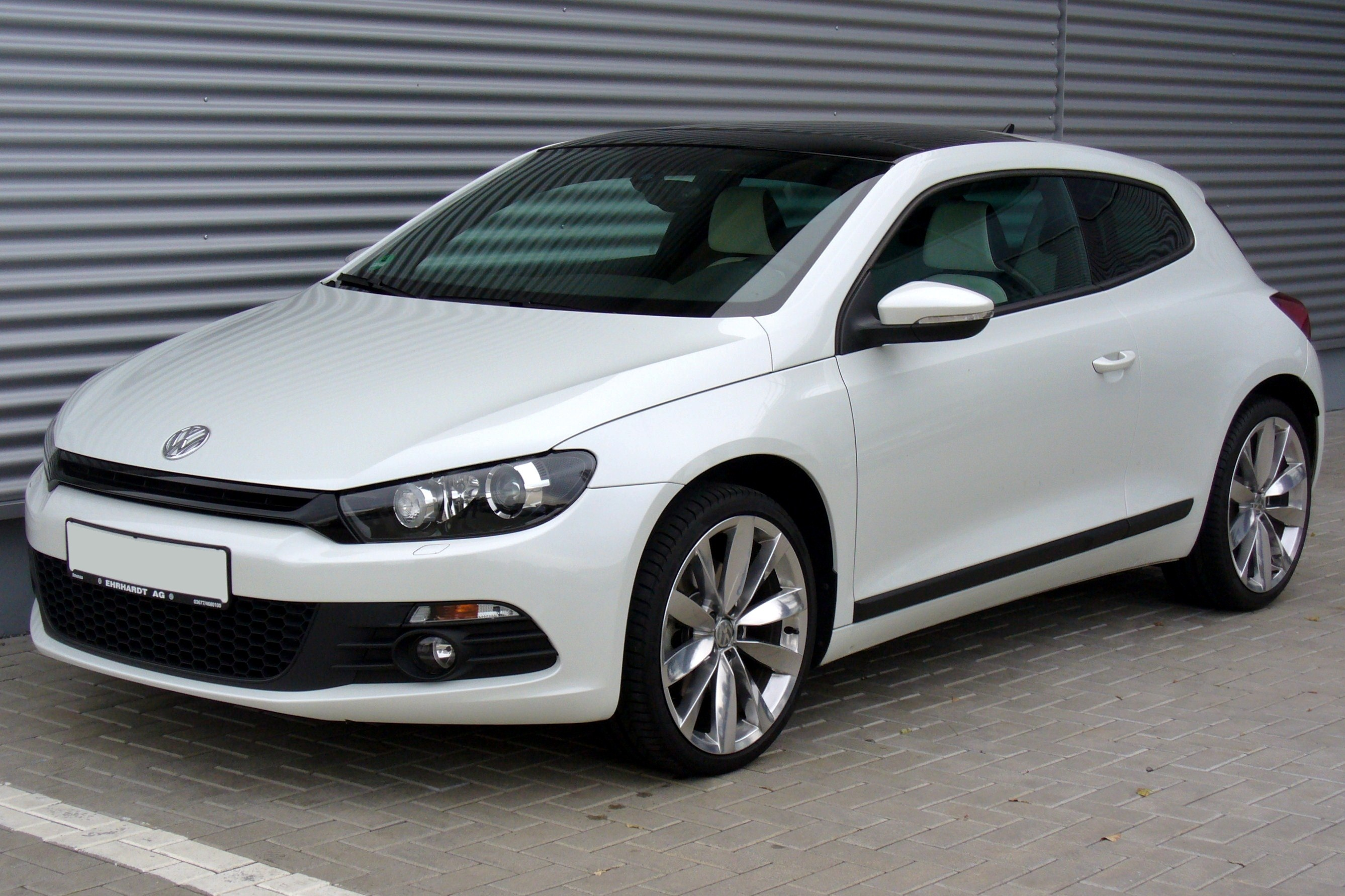

Overview
- Production: 2008–2017
- Assembly: Germany: Wolfsburg; Portugal: Palmela (AutoEuropa)
- Designer: Walter de Silva; Marc Lichte

Body and chassis
- Platform: Volkswagen Group A5 platform
- Related: Volkswagen Golf Mk6; Volkswagen Eos; SEAT León Mk2

Powertrain
- Engine: 1.4 L TSI I4 (petrol); 2.0 L TSI I4 (petrol); 2.0 L TDI I4 (diesel)
- Transmission: 6-speed manual 6-speed automatic (DSG); 7-speed automatic (DSG)

Dimensions
- Wheelbase: 2,578 mm (101.5 in)
- Length: 4,256 mm (167.6 in)
- Width: 1,810 mm (71.3 in)
- Height: 1,404 mm (55.3 in)
- Curb weight: 1,298 kg (2,862 lb)-1,450 kg (3,197 lb)

Chronology
- Predecessor: Volkswagen Corrado

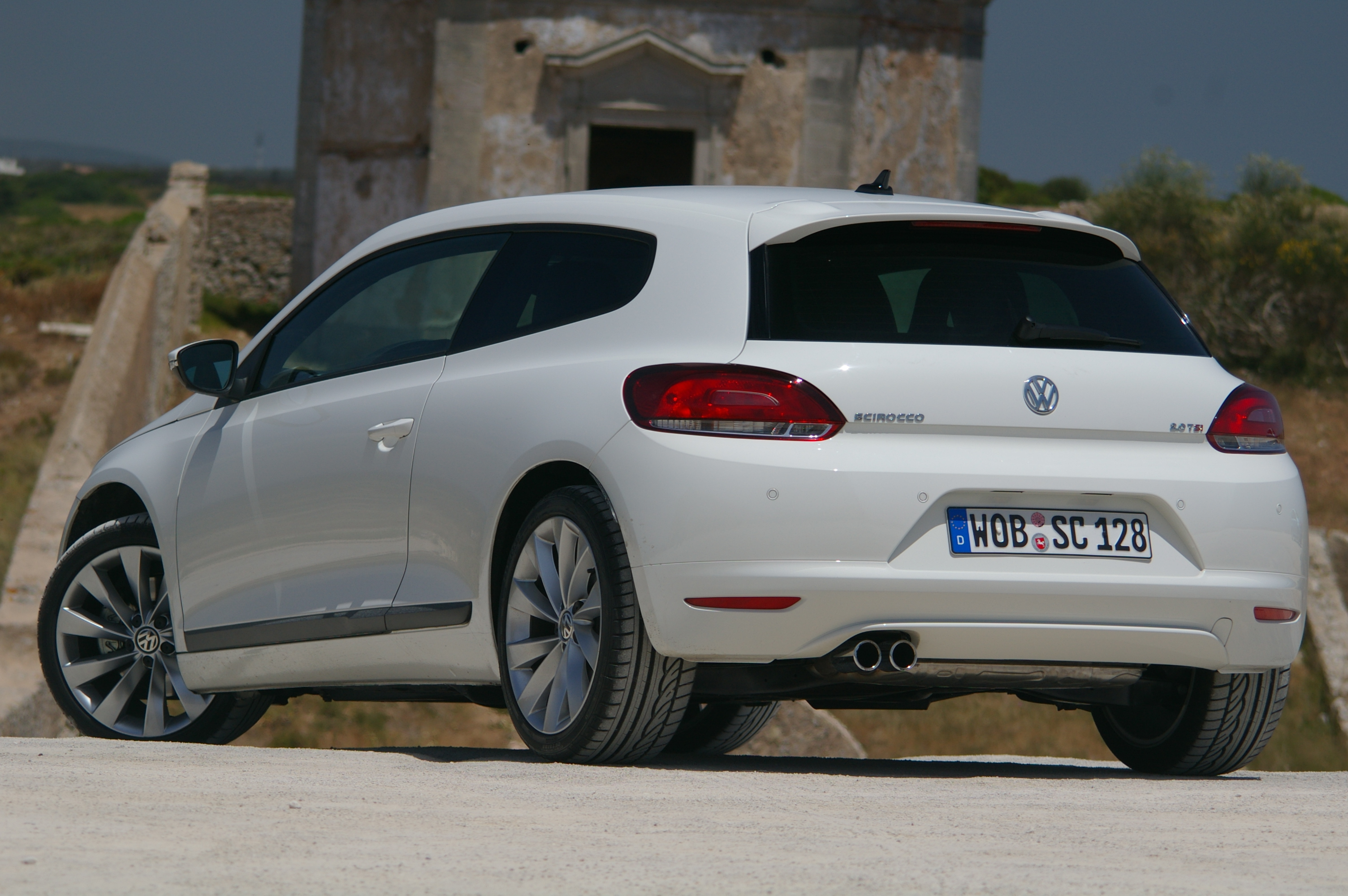
Pre-facelift Scirocco (Europe)

Volkswagen officially announced in June 2006 production of a new Scirocco model at the AutoEuropa assembly plant in Palmela, Portugal.

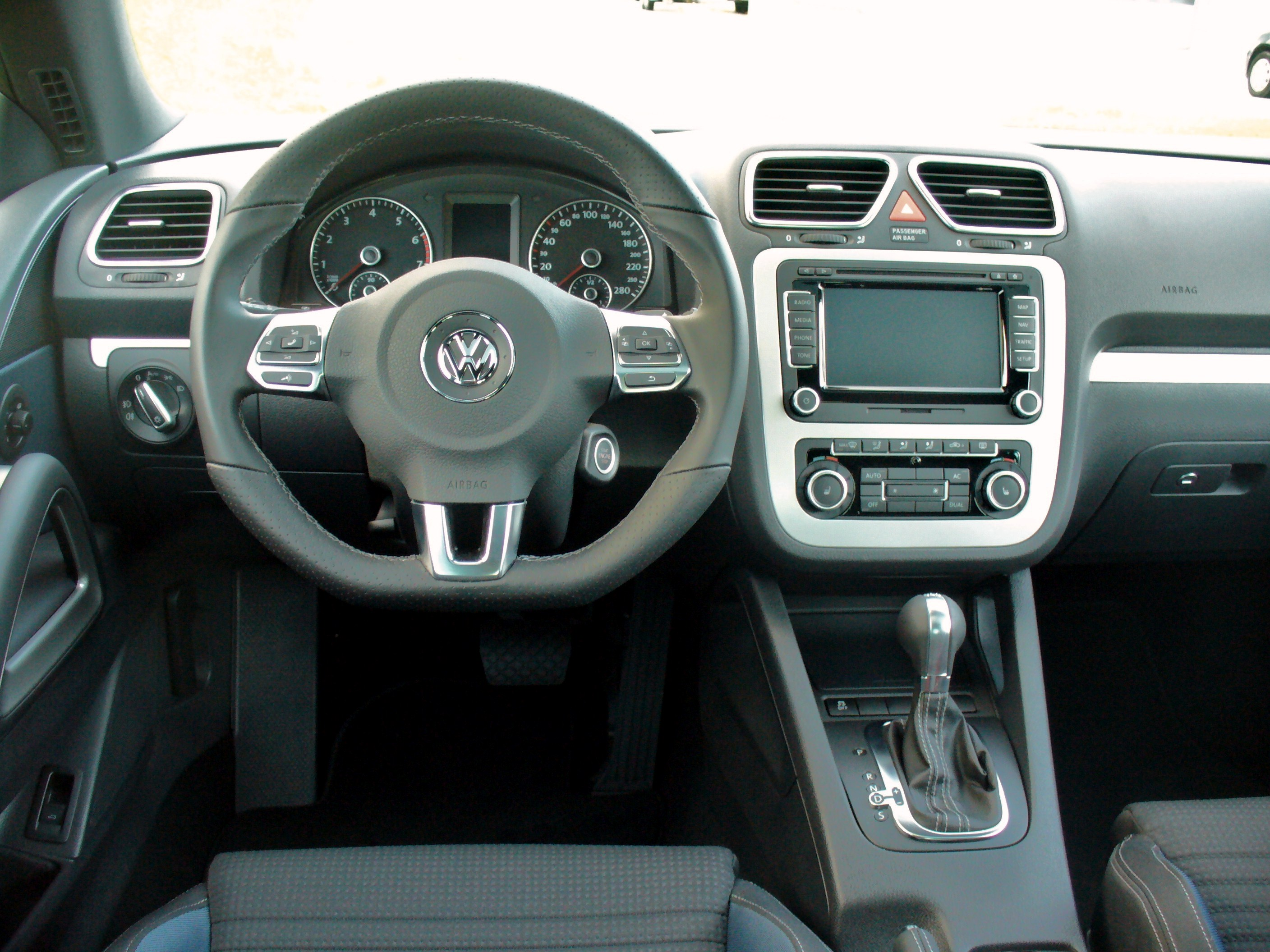
Pre-facelift Scirocco interior

The new model, identified by the internal type numbers 137 or 1K8, is based on the PQ35 platform of the Golf V and was unveiled at the 2008 Geneva Motor Show. It went on sale in summer 2008 in Europe, with sales in other countries beginning early 2009. The Type 3 Scirocco won "Car of the Year 2008" from Top Gear Magazine.

The 2008 model of the Scirocco received a five star safety rating from Euro NCAP even after the driver test dummy's head hit the steering wheel when the airbag bottomed out. The model tested was a left-hand-drive three-door hatchback and scored in four areas:

- Adult Occupant 87%, 31 points
- Child Occupant 73%, 36 points
- Pedestrian 53%, 19 points
- Safety Assist 71%, 5 points

=== Scirocco R-line (2011–2018) ===
In 2011, Volkswagen added the R-line trim for all engine versions of the car. It included new front and back bumpers, side skirts on the exterior, and seats with grey Alcantara, R-line badges on the backs of the seats, driving wheel and on the doorsteps inside the car.

=== Scirocco R (2009–2018) ===
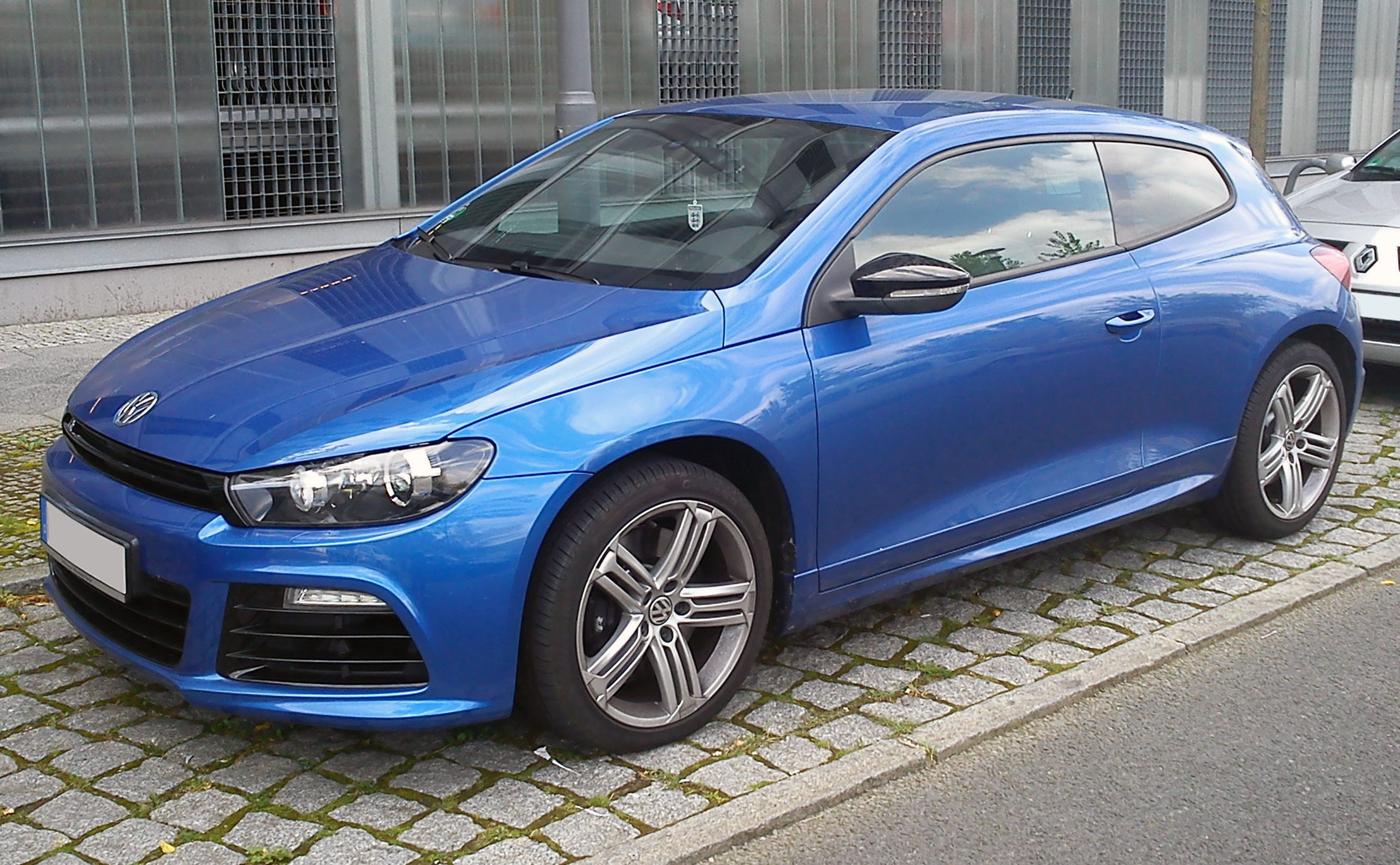
Volkswagen Scirocco R

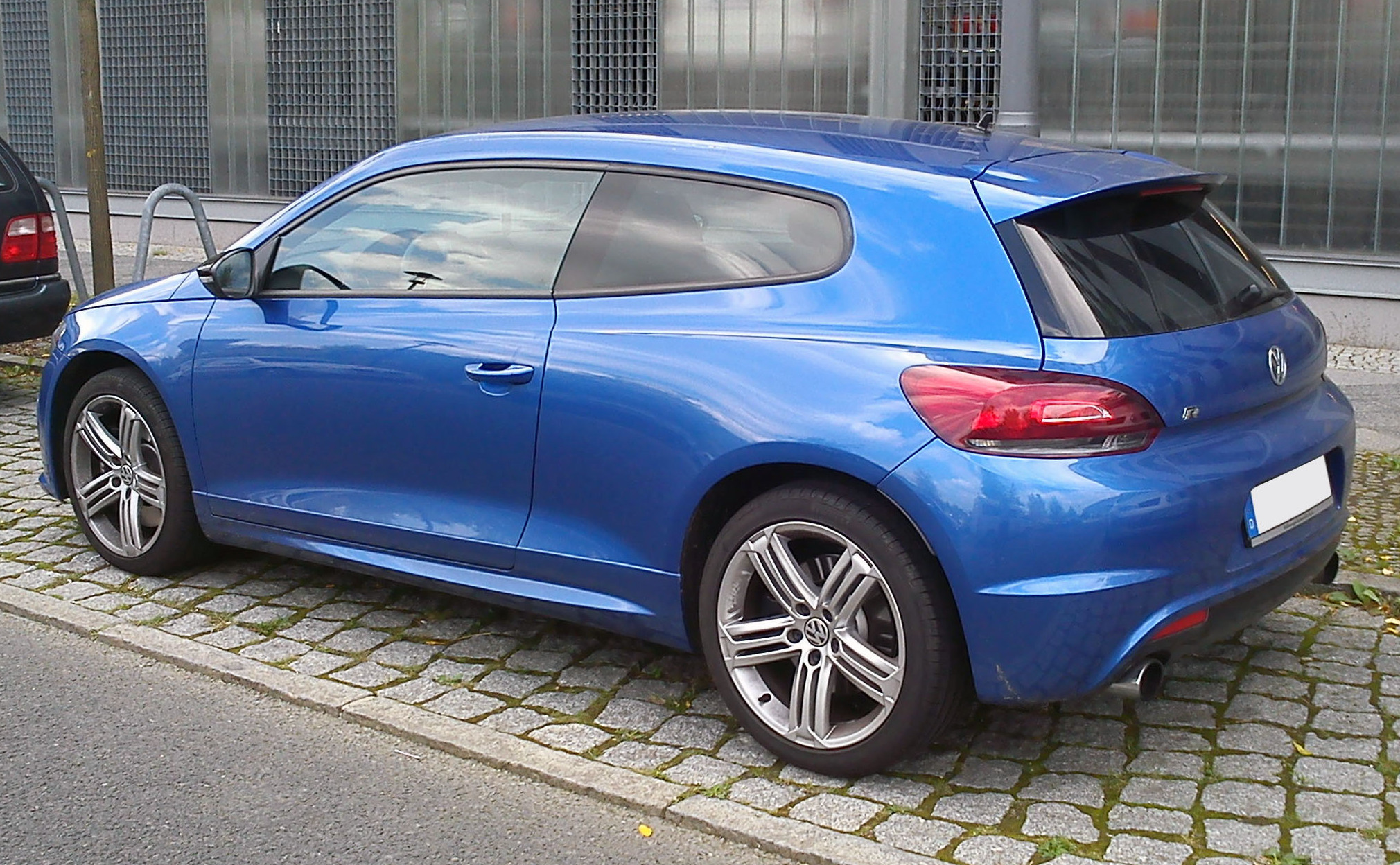
Rear view

The Scirocco R is a production model based on the GT24. Its 1,984 cc (2.0 L) TSI straight-four engine is rated at 195 kW; 261 hp (265 PS) at 6,000 rpm and 350 N⋅m (258 lb⋅ft) of torque at 2,500 rpm. It features large air intake openings in the front bumper, an integrated front spoiler, bi-xenon headlights, larger rear roof edge spoiler, black diffuser, dual exhaust with chrome tailpipes, and Talladega 19-inch alloy wheels. In September 2014, the R model had a facelift on the styling of the car and a power increase taking it to 206 kW; 280 PS (276 hp).

UK models went on sale in 2009.

=== Facelift ===
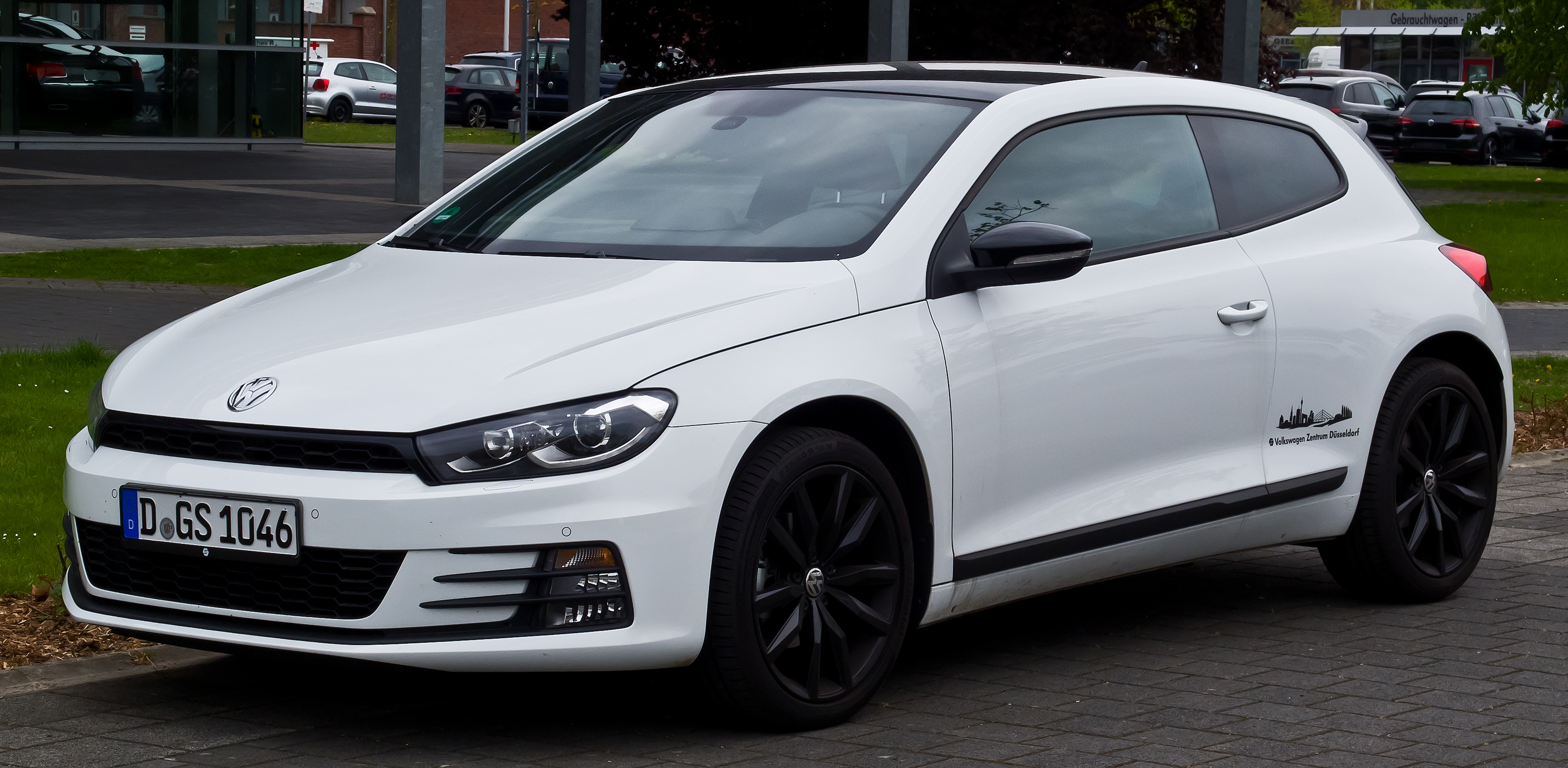
Facelift Volkswagen Scirocco (Germany)

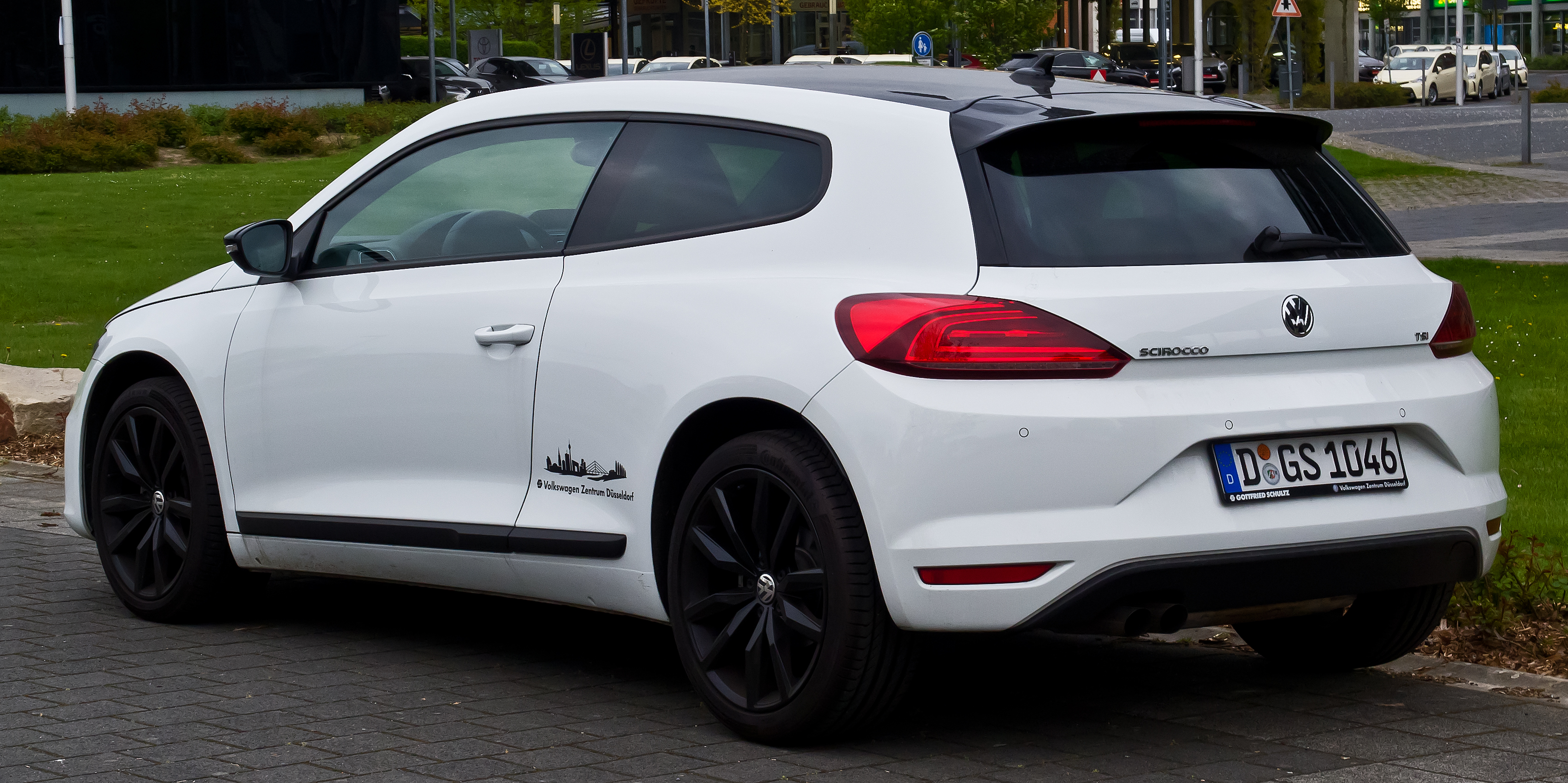
Facelift Volkswagen Scirocco (Germany)

Six years after its launch in 2008, Volkswagen revealed the 2014 Scirocco facelift at the Geneva Motor Show. On the outside the changes were not obvious as Volkswagen installed only a slightly re-profiled bumper, new bi-xenon headlights with LED daytime running lights and they also tweaked the grille. At the back there were restyled LED taillights, along with a reworked bumper and boot lid. The changes carried over onto the range-topping Scirocco R as well.

=== Scirocco GTS (2015–2017) ===
Volkswagen unveiled the Scirocco GTS, featuring the same engine found in the Mk7 Golf GTI.

=== Engines ===
Model	Years	engine type/code	Power at rpm	Torque at rpm
Petrol engines
1.4 TSI	2008–2017	1,390 cc (1.39 L; 85 cu in) I4 turbo (EA111 CAXA)	122 PS (90 kW; 120 hp) at 5,000	200 N⋅m (148 lb⋅ft) at 1,500–4,000
1.4 TSI BlueMotion Technology	2009–2017	1,390 cc (1.39 L; 85 cu in) I4 turbo	122 PS (90 kW; 120 hp) at 5,000	200 N⋅m (148 lb⋅ft) at 1,500–4,000
1.4 TSI	2008–2017	1,390 cc (1.39 L; 85 cu in) I4 Turbo&Supercharger (EA111 CAVD/CTHD)	163 PS (120 kW; 161 hp) at 5,800	240 N⋅m (177 lb⋅ft) at 1,500–4,500
2.0 TSI	2008–2015	1,984 cc (1.984 L; 121.1 cu in) I4 turbo (EA888 CCTA/CCZA/CBFA/CAWB)	211 PS (155 kW; 208 hp) at 5,300–6,200	280 N⋅m (207 lb⋅ft) at 1,700–5,000
2.0 TSI GTS SIMOS 18.x ECU	2015-2017	1,984 cc (1.984 L, 121.1 cu in) I4 turbo (EA888 Gen3 CULC)	220 PS (162 kW; 217 hp) at 4,500 - 6,200	350 N-m (258 lb-ft) at 1,500 - 4400
Scirocco R / 2.0 TSI	2009–2014	1,984 cc (1.984 L; 121.1 cu in) I4 turbo (EA113 CDLA)	265 PS (195 kW; 261 hp) at 6,000	350 N⋅m (258 lb⋅ft) at 2,500
Scirocco R / 2.0 TSI	2015–2017	1,984 cc (1.984 L; 121.1 cu in) I4 turbo (EA113 CDLK)	280 PS (206 kW; 276 hp) at 6,000	350 N⋅m (258 lb⋅ft) at 2,500
Diesel engines
2.0 TDI CR	2008–2014	1,968 cc (1.968 L; 120.1 cu in) I4 turbo (EA189 CBAB)	140 PS (103 kW; 138 hp) at 4,000	320 N⋅m (236 lb⋅ft) at 1,750–2,500
2.0 TDI CR	2009–2014	1,968 cc (1.968 L; 120.1 cu in) I4 turbo (EA189)	170 PS (125 kW; 168 hp) at 4,200	350 N⋅m (258 lb⋅ft) at 1,750–2,500
2.0 TDI CR	2015–2017	1,968 cc (1.968 L; 120.1 cu in) I4 turbo (EA288 CUUB)	150 PS (110 kW; 148 hp) at 3,500	340 N⋅m (251 lb⋅ft) at 1,750–3,000
2.0 TDI CR	2015–2017	1,968 cc (1.968 L; 120.1 cu in) I4 turbo (EA288 CUWA/CUXA)	184 PS (135 kW; 181 hp) at 3,500	380 N⋅m (280 lb⋅ft) at 1,750–3,000

All models include standard six-speed manual transmission. The 1.4 TSI (162 PS) can optionally be fitted with a seven-speed DSG transmission, while the 2.0 TSI 200, 2.0 TSI 210, R 2.0 TSI 265 and 2.0 TDI are available with a six-speed DSG transmission.
The EA888 2.0 TSI uses an IHI K03 water-cooled turbocharger incorporated in exhaust manifold, while a BorgWarner turbocharger is used in EA113 2.0 TSI versions. The 2.0 TDI (140 PS) used a Garrett GT1749VA turbo, while the higher output 170 PS engine used the GT1749VB.

The 140 PS 2.0 TDI engine is also provided with the BlueMotion Technology package. This package features stop start technology and regenerative braking to reduce emissions to 118 g/km CO_{2}.

=== Motorsports ===
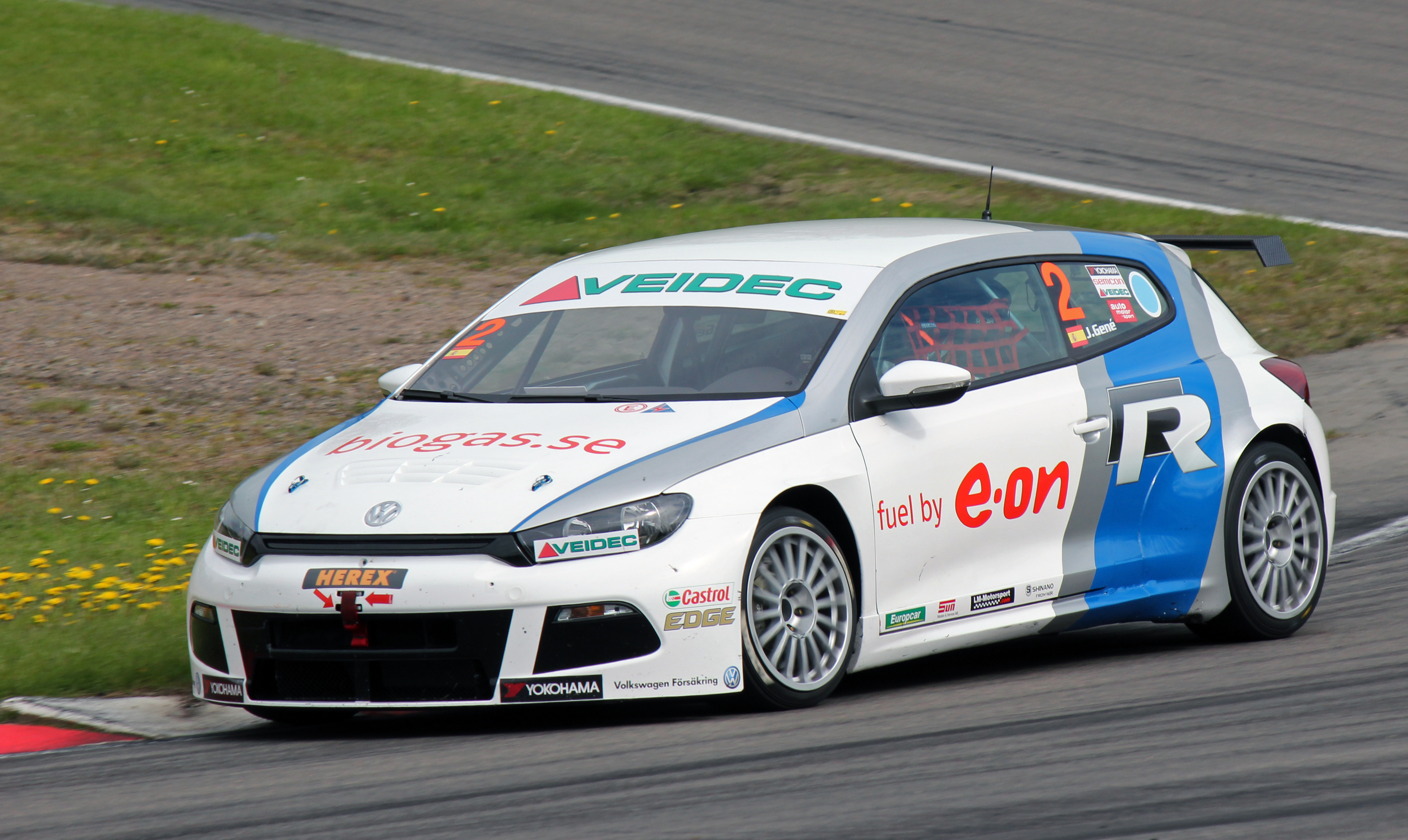
VW Scirocco STCC

In the 24 Hours Nürburgring in May 2008, three new Volkswagen Sciroccos competed, finishing 11th and 15th out of a field of over 200 cars, with veteran Hans-Joachim Stuck driving both cars (and Carlos Sainz the slower one). The direct competitors, two Opel Astra H GTC driven by drivers selected from 18,000 hopefuls in a year-long TV covered process, were beaten decisively. In the 2012 edition of the Scandinavian Touring Car Championship Johan Kristoffersson won the championship for Volkswagen Team Biogas in a Scirocco.

=== Absence of a North American version ===
In April 2007, Volkswagen America vice president Adrian Hallmark claimed that Volkswagen preferred not to bring the Scirocco to North America since it could negatively affect Golf GTI sales. It was later stated that the final decision would be made in 2008 by Martin Winterkorn (Volkswagen's CEO), not Volkswagen of America.

In early March 2008, MotorAuthority reported that, due to the increasing gap between the United States dollar and the euro, the Scirocco would not be made available for American consumers. "This car would fit the US market but at the current exchange rate we wouldn't make any money," Volkswagen sales and marketing chief Detlef Wittig told Bloomberg reporters.

=== Concepts ===
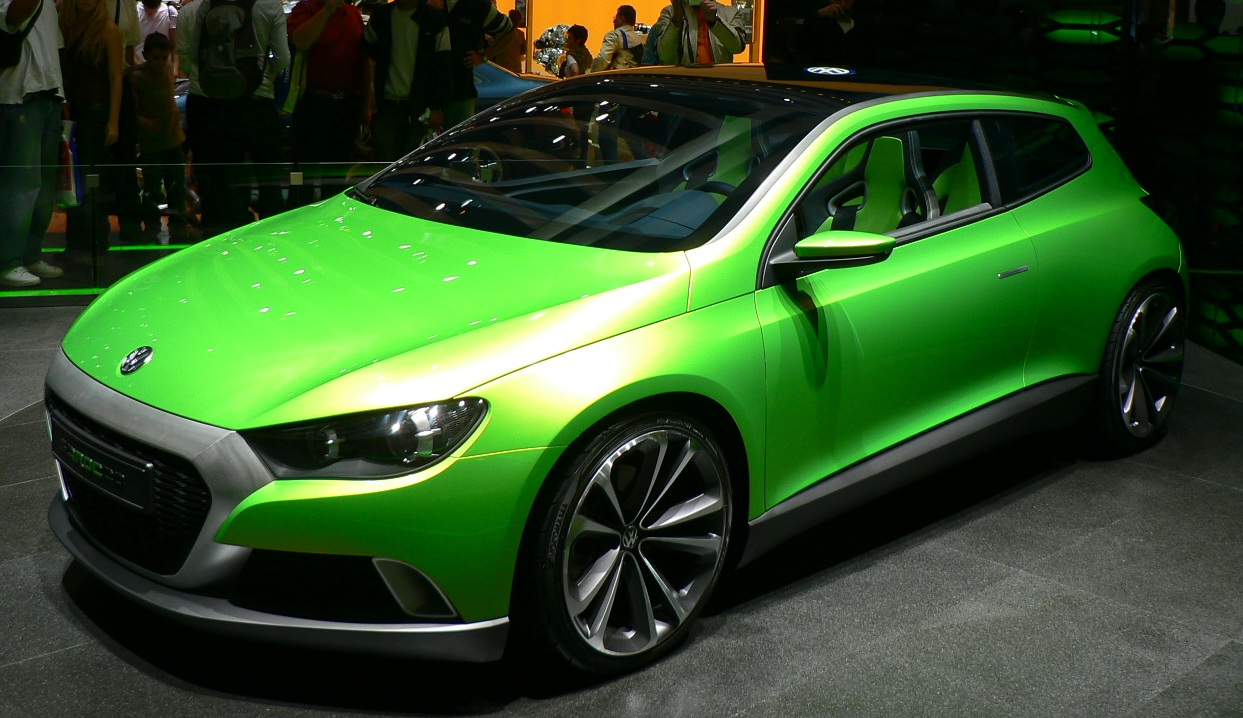
IROC concept at the 2006 Paris Motor Show

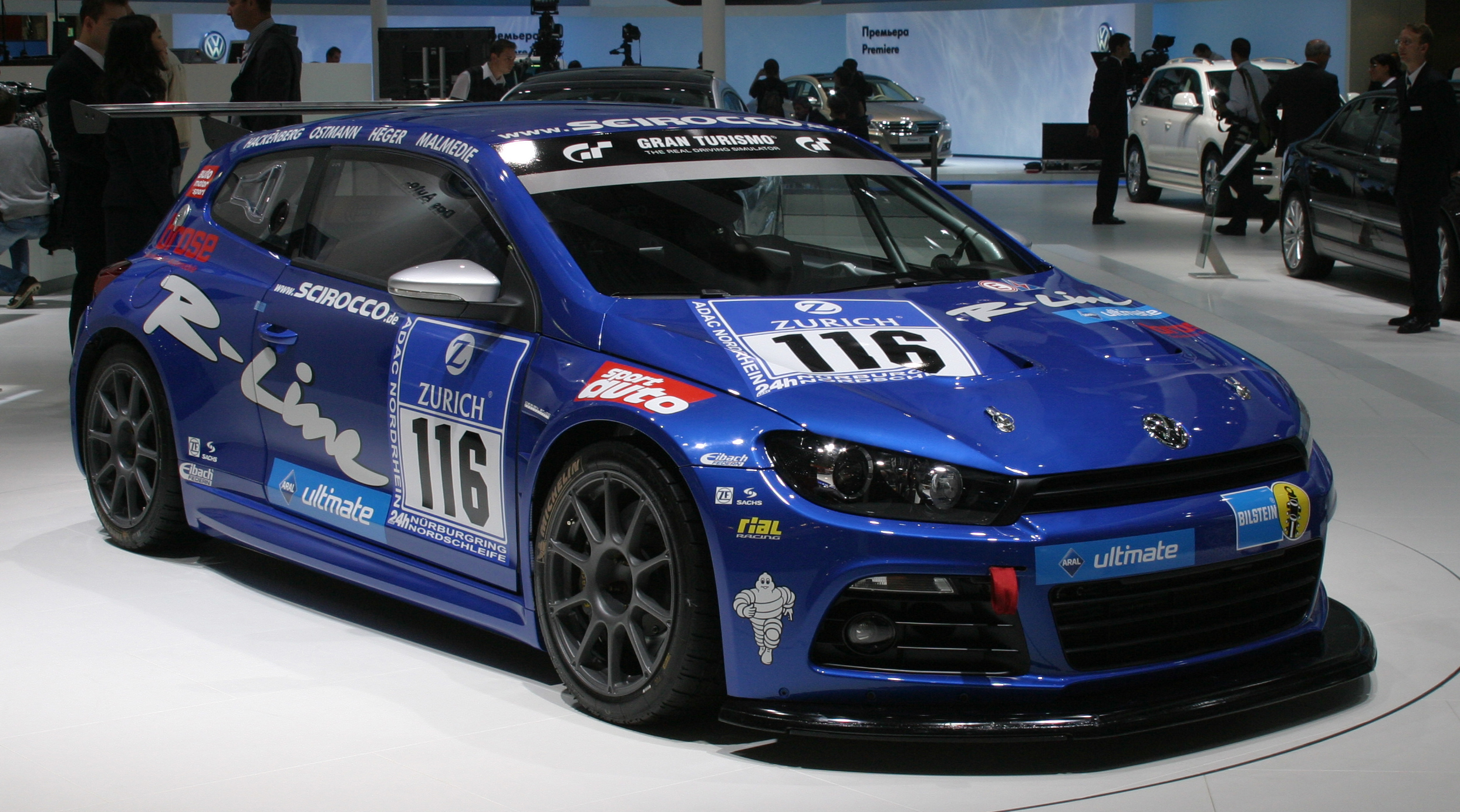
Scirocco GT24 racecar

==== IROC concept (2006) ====
A concept car previewing the then upcoming Scirocco III was unveiled at the 2006 Paris Motor Show. Named IROC, from the middle four letters of "Scirocco", it used a 200 hp (149 kW) TSI engine.

==== Scirocco GT24 (2008–) ====
The Scirocco GT24 is a race car for the 24-hour race at the Nürburgring. It has a 2.0 L TSI engine rated at 325 PS (239 kW; 321 hp) and 340 N⋅m (251 lb⋅ft) at 2,100 rpm as well as a DSG transmission.

The GT24 was unveiled at the GTI Meet 2008 in Wörthersee.

==== Scirocco Studie R (2008) ====
The Studie R is a concept car based on the Scirocco GT24, after Volkswagen had cancelled the production of the Scirocco R32. It has a 2.0 L TSI engine rated at 270 PS (199 kW; 266 hp), six-speed dual clutch transmission, four-piston brake calipers and a sound-optimized exhaust system with oval tailpipes.

The Studie R was unveiled at the Bologna Motor Show.

== Future ==
In 2017, Volkswagen's Chief Development Officer Dr. Frank Welsch stated that Volkswagen was contemplating options for a new small coupé, and was not clear on how they would approach a new Scirocco, and the possibility of a MEB-based concept. Welsch said that if the Scirocco name was to be used again, it would only be for a sporty 2-door coupé, and would not have a drastically different design from previous Sciroccos. In 2020, when asked if a new Scirocco was planned, board member Thomas Ulbrich answered "I don't think so", and that they were in no rush to release a new coupé.
