= Talbot Samba =

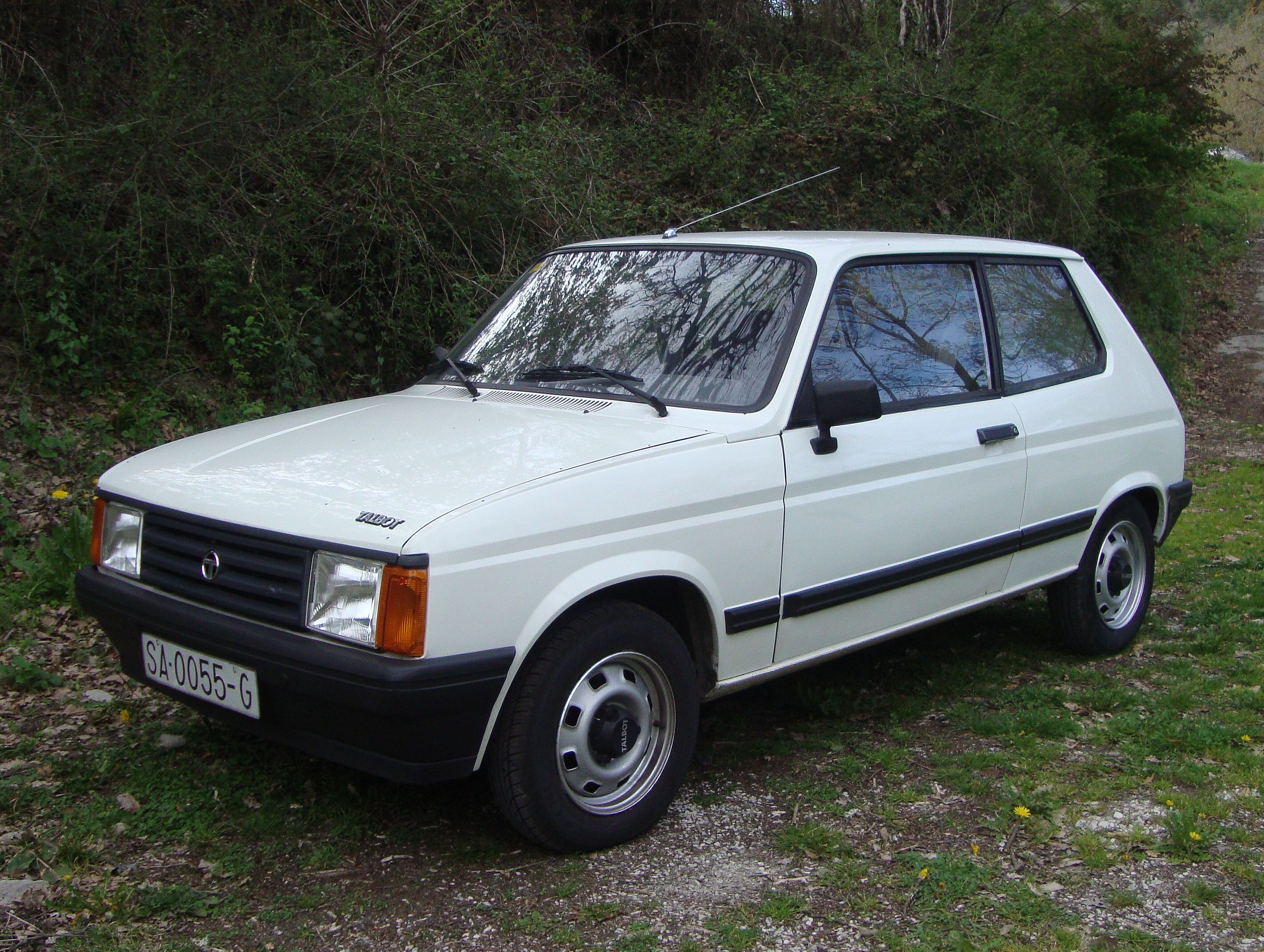

Overview
- Manufacturer: Talbot (PSA Group)
- Production: 1981–1986
- Assembly: France: Poissy (Poissy Plant); Spain: Madrid

Body and chassis
- Class: City car (A)
- Body style: 3-door hatchback 2-door cabrio
- Layout: FF layout
- Related: Citroën LN/LNA; Citroën Visa; Peugeot 104

Powertrain
- Engine: 1.0 L XV I4; 1.1 L XW I4; 1.2 L XZ I4; 1.4 L XY I4
- Transmission: 4-speed manual 5-speed manual

Dimensions
- Wheelbase: 2,340 mm (92 in)
- Length: 3,506 mm (138.0 in)
- Width: 1,528 mm (60.2 in)
- Height: 1,362 mm (53.6 in)
- Curb weight: 740 kg (1,630 lb)-850 kg (1,873.9 lb)

Chronology
- Predecessor: Talbot Sunbeam
- Successor: Peugeot 205

The Talbot Samba is a city car manufactured by the PSA Group in the former Simca factory in Poissy, France, and marketed under the short-lived modern-day Talbot brand from 1981 to 1986. Based on the Peugeot 104, it and the Talbot Express were the only Talbots not inherited from Chrysler Europe, engineered by PSA alone. It was also the last new Talbot car to be launched. Its demise in 1986 was effectively the end of the Talbot brand for passenger cars. Launched initially as a three-door hatchback, it was also for some time the only small car available in a factory-ordered cabrio body style, and the most economical car in Europe.

== Development ==
=== Background ===
The PSA Group, formed in 1976 when Peugeot bought out its competitor, Citroën, took over the former Chrysler Europe in 1979; one of its first decisions was to rebrand all of the models manufactured in the French and British factories to Talbot. Among the models inherited from Chrysler was the Scottish-built rear-wheel drive Chrysler Sunbeam, the only small car in the lineup.

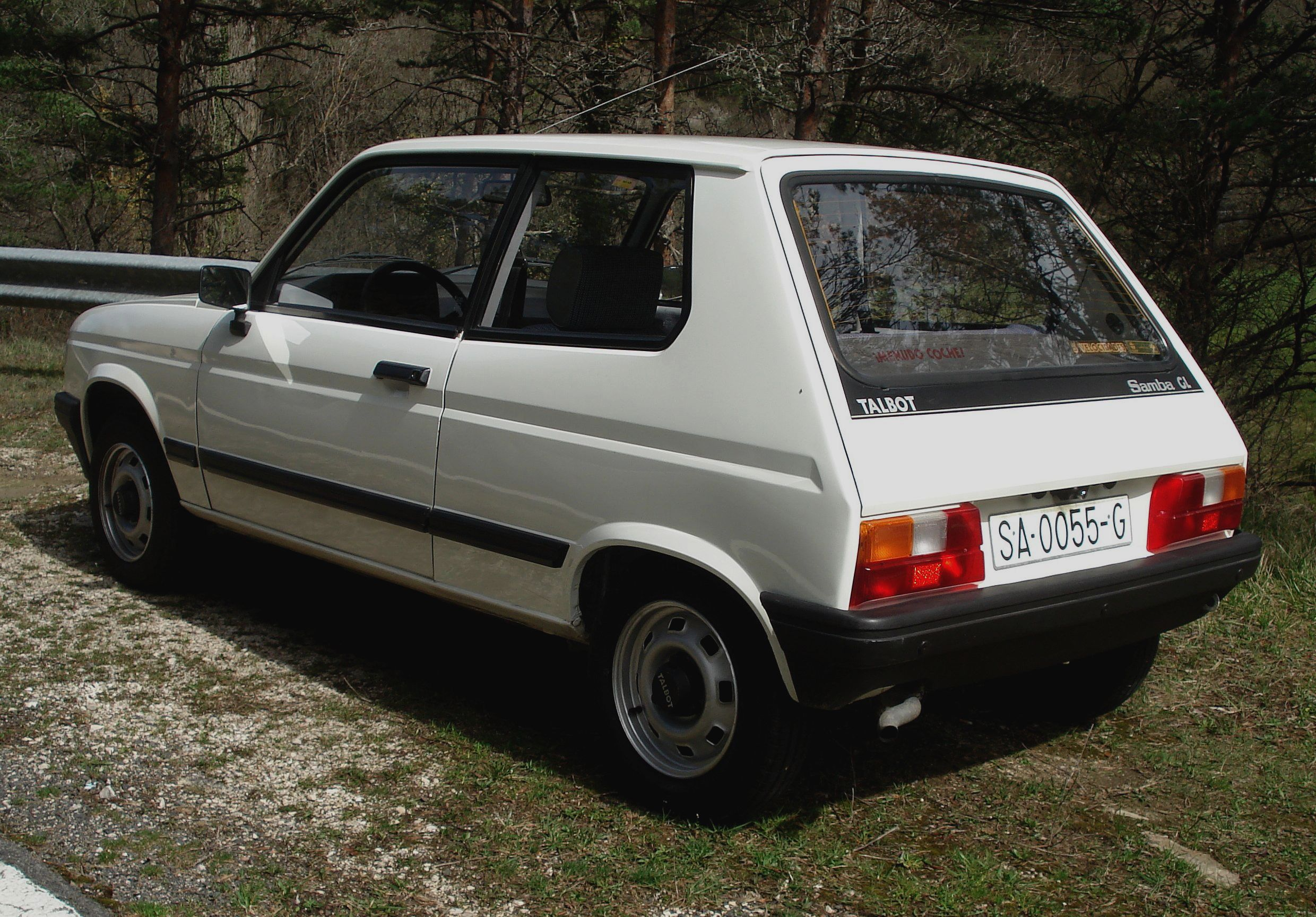
Rear view

The Sunbeam was originally conceived by Chrysler as a stopgap model, developed to keep the Linwood works running—it was based on the running gear of the earlier Avenger made there—while helping the company to maintain a foothold in the growing small car market. Aware that a more modern design was needed to compete with upcoming front-wheel drive rivals, Chrysler undertook some development work on a shortened version of the Chrysler Horizon (which had the development code C2), dubbed C2-short, but it was cut short by the company's financial problems and plans to divest Chrysler Europe.

PSA decided that the Linwood plant would be unprofitable to maintain and should be closed, which meant an end to both the Avenger and Sunbeam model lines, further emphasizing the need for a new small car in the Talbot lineup. On the eve of the 1980s, PSA's city cars lineup consisted of models based on the veteran front-wheel drive 1972 Peugeot 104, which came in a shorter three-door and longer five-door version. Citroën rebadged the short-wheelbase 104 as the Citroën LN, and the long-wheelbase chassis formed the base of the five-door Citroën Visa.

=== Decision ===
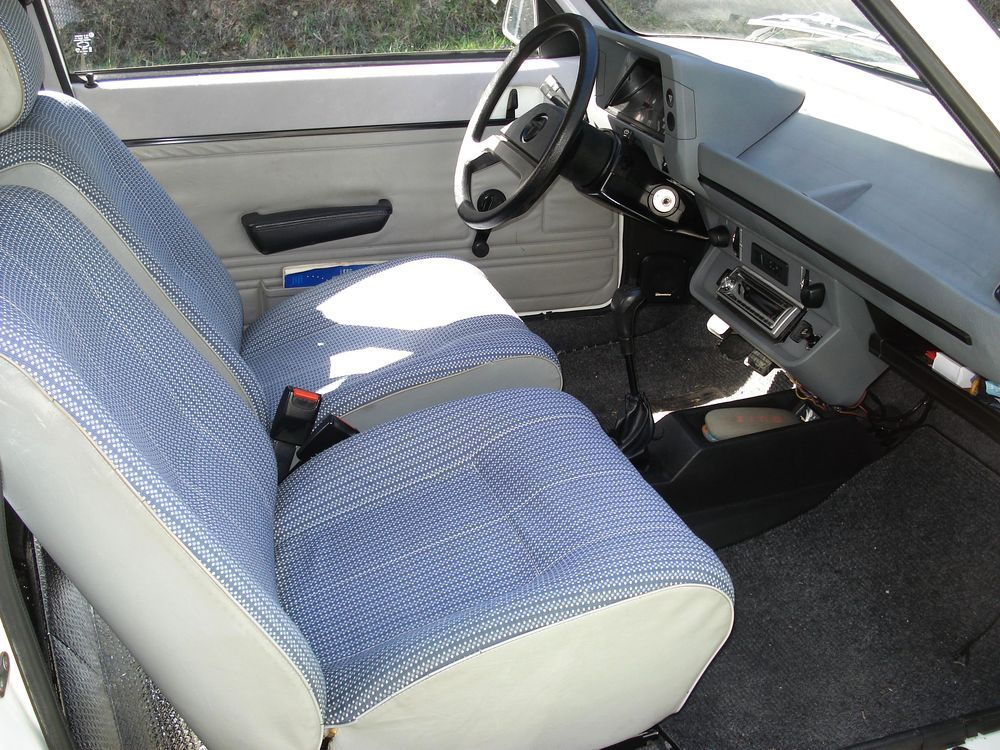
Interior

In 1979, PSA decided that their new small Talbot would also be based on the 104 rather than the Horizon. Keeping the common underpinnings allowed the new model, known internally as project C15 (later renamed to T15 to reflect the brand change from Chrysler to Talbot) to be launched in 1981, in time to replace the Sunbeam when Linwood would close. In order not to create too much internal competition, a wheelbase situated in between the three- and five-door versions of the 104 was chosen. This made the projected model slot in size slightly below popular superminis such as the Ford Fiesta, but above the city cars, including the about-to-be-launched Austin Metro.

=== Styling ===
As with previous Talbot and Chrysler Europe models, styling of the T15 was the responsibility of the British design centre in Whitley, Coventry. The stylists were limited by the need to retain the entire body structure of the 104, and allegedly were given Peugeot's own proposal of a 104 facelift as a starting point. The resulting design was quite different from and more modern-looking than its progenitor; only the bonnet and tailgate were shared, and the car was given a distinctive front end in Chrysler/Talbot "international" style.

== Launch ==
Production of the new car started in October 1981, and it was officially launched as the Talbot Samba in December. Unlike the Horizon, 1510/Alpine or Solara, which were made simultaneously in France and England, the new Samba was assembled only in Poissy. The engine lineup included three versions of the four cylinder PSA X engine, which the Samba shared with its Peugeot and Citroën siblings, coupled with three trim levels. The base LE and LS came with the 954 cc XV, the GL with the 1124 cc XW and the top-of-the-line GLS with the largest 1360 cc XY engine. The GLS was also available with a five-speed transmission. Power outputs are 45, 50, and 72 PS (33, 37, and 53 kW) respectively. The engine was tilted 72 degrees backwards to allow the spare tire to be stored under the bonnet without having to raise it, and drove the gearbox through a set of step-down pinions. The GL was rated as "Europe's most economical car" according to the official EEC fuel consumption figures, bettering the previously triumphant Renault 5, but later lost the title to the Austin Metro.

=== Cabrio ===
Talbot Samba Cabrio

In an effort to make the vehicle stand out in the market against similar rivals, which included its own derivatives, Peugeot added a more glamorous two-door cabriolet to the standard three-door hatchback. Although announced at the hatchback's launch, the first models were not available until 1982. Designed and built by the Italian coachbuilder Pininfarina, who had been building open-top Peugeots since the 1960s, it came only with the 1360 cc engine; two engine versions were offered, 53 or 59 kilowatts (72 or 80 PS)—the former was dropped after 1984, at which time a slightly revised cabriolet was released featuring the later style 104 dashboard, twin carburettors and a lined hood; the 80 bhp engine was shared with the Rallye. At the time of its launch it was the only cabrio small car available from the manufacturer, although other models subsequently entered the market segment created by the Samba, including PSA's own Citroën Visa Décapotable. Pininfarina built 13,062 Samba cabriolets.

=== Rallye ===
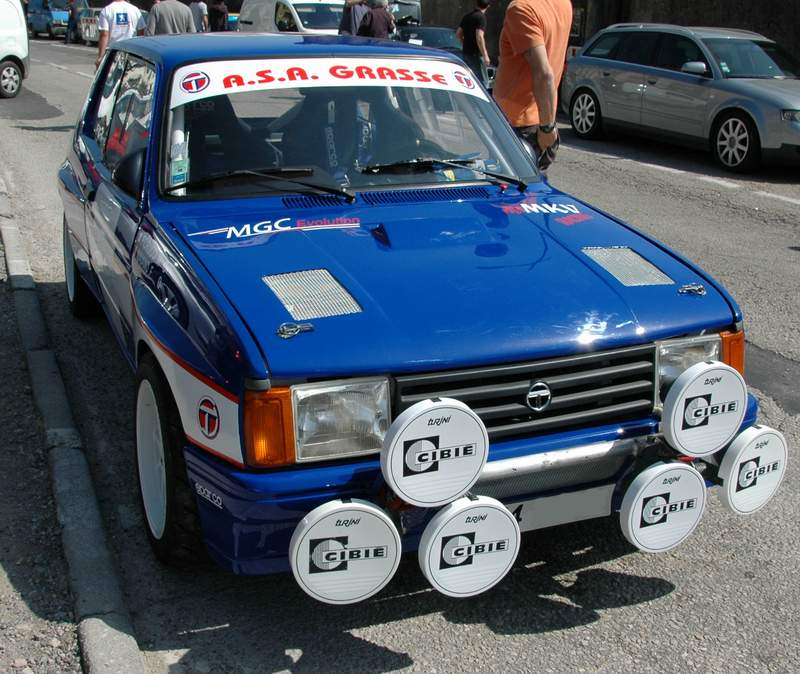
Samba-SR2-Group B

Following the rallying successes of the Simca 1000 and the Talbot Sunbeam, PSA launched the Samba Rallye in 1983. Fitted with the 1219 cc XZ version of the X engine, delivering 66 kilowatt (90 PS), it came in either white or red, with a hood scoop and side stripes. In 1984, a version with the 1360 cc unit producing 59 kilowatt (80 PS) was launched, without the stripes. A special rallye-only Group B model, officially called the Peugeot Talbot Sport Samba Rallye preceded the later Peugeot 205 T16, with a 1285 cc, 96 kilowatt engine (130 PS).

==== Talbot Samba Rally Group B ====
After the success with amateur drivers of the Simca Rallye and the 104 GR2 and GR5, the Peugeot Talbot Sport group under the leadership of Jean Todt decided to homologate the Talbot Samba Rallye in group B. It proved effective on asphalt.

In January 1983, the Samba type SRE was homologated, and two-hundred examples were produced by the PTS group - mainly aimed at private drivers. While still competitive, the Samba Rallye was considerably less expensive than other brands. Its weight is 675 kg (1,488 lb), thanks to the use of fiberglass body parts (the doors, the rear hatch, the engine cover). Suspension is coil overs, while the brakes are AP Lockheed four-piston calipers at the front and aluminum two-piston calipers for the rear. Also fitted was an aluminum roll bar, faster steering rack, Makrolon windows, hydraulic handbrake, one-piece PTS rims, front and rear anti-roll bar, four-in-two-in-one exhaust, oil cooler, and a reinforced rear axle. The overhead camshaft engine was increased to 1,285 cc and produced 130 hp (96 kW), all coupled to a short gearbox with self-locking differential.

Talbot Samba Rallye Group B SRE2 evolution

In January 1984 the Samba Rallye evolution type SR2 is homologated. The changes are numerous: increased tracks with wide fenders in polyester, triangulated front axle, new engine cradle, lengthened and reinforced transmission gimbals, fiber front bumper with brake cooling scoops, new anti-roll bar, standard triple-Y exhaust (4–2–1), adoption of a new generation front and rear AP brake, specific steering rods and the possibility of choosing five different roll cage models (aluminum or steel).

The engine increases to 1,296 cc and 136 hp (100 kW) with the adoption of a more aggressive camshaft and larger intake ducts.

Quickly a catalog including all the Samba group B parts is offered by the Peugeot team. This is how some private pilots could have their own Group B Samba built by small workshops like Mathiot, Brozzi, or Bouhier. This has the effect of increasing the number of Samba group B beyond the initial two hundred copies released.

The car notably won the 1985 Al Fito Hill Climb, with Spaniard Paulino Diaz.

1,440 and 1,550 cc evolutions

Two engine manufacturers are at the origin of the development of these ultimate evolutions. They are Mathiot and Brozzi, they obtain these displacements by changing the engine bore to 78.50 mm for the 1440 and 80 mm for 1550 cc. These engines were already present on the Peugeot 104 Group 5 as well as on the Citroën Visa Mille Pistes.

To fit in with rally regulations, the little Samba had to be ballasted in order to reach the 750 kg (1,653 lb) minimum weight required for cars in the 1600 cc class. On the other hand, in hillclimbing, it was at the right weight of 675 kg and in this discipline, it became an even more successful machine.

== Later developments ==
In 1982, the Talbot Group was merged into Peugeot within PSA, and responsibility for the model was devolved to France. The Whitley design studio was dissolved, and some of the designers crossed over to British Leyland, where they joined their former boss Roy Axe. PSA had by then already started work on a replacement for the Samba, based on the Citroën AX, a few prototypes of which—essentially rebadged AXs—were created in 1983/84. The Samba sold reasonably well throughout 1982 and 1983, after which sales began to suffer, partly because of the model's aging and partly because of competition from the very popular Peugeot 205, which created strong internal competition within PSA for the little Talbot.

To sustain interest in the Samba towards the end of its life, PSA launched a few concept and special versions of the model. The Copacabana was a Samba-based concept car, featuring body elements painted in garish colors. It was followed by the 1984 Samba Sympa production model, targeted at "young buyers", which came in silver metallic paint, with a choice of yellow, red or blue highlights and either a radio or a sunroof. In 1985, the sunroof became standard and only yellow highlights were available. The Samba Bahia (marketed as the Samba Trio in the UK) was a 1985 model, also targeted at younger customers. It came with the 1.1 litre engine, denim-covered seats, and a sunroof, and was painted in metallic blue. The Samba Style model was launched with both radio and sunroof as standard, but not the colourful highlights, essentially to facilitate the sales of the last Samba series.

While interest was waning as the 1980s progressed, the Samba was the only remaining Talbot to sell in meaningful numbers as the brand was gradually phased out. Peugeot had been working on developing a replacement for the Samba as late as 1984, which would have been based on the forthcoming Citroën AX, but this project was abandoned as Peugeot took the decision to phase out the Talbot brand, and the Peugeot 205 was proving so popular that Peugeot felt little need for a third car of this size within the group.

The Citroën AX was launched without a twin in 1986, and the only other Talbot in development, the Arizona family hatchback, was launched instead as the Peugeot 309 at the end of 1985. Production of the Samba ended in May 1986, by which time 270,555 had been made, signalling the beginning of the end of the Talbot brand for passenger cars, the death knell finally sounding the following year when the last Horizon rolled off the production line in Finland – although the brand survived on the Talbot Express, one of the Sevel Sud vans, until 1994.

The Talbot Samba is almost extinct on UK roads with only 12 remaining as of 2018.

== Jeremy Clarkson video ==
In Jeremy Clarkson's 2009 DVD Duel, a 1984 Talbot Samba Cabriolet was destroyed by hurling it from a catapult into a wall, with a speed camera nearby showing that its speed was 164 mph (264 km/h) before it hit the wall and exploded.
