= Renault 14 =

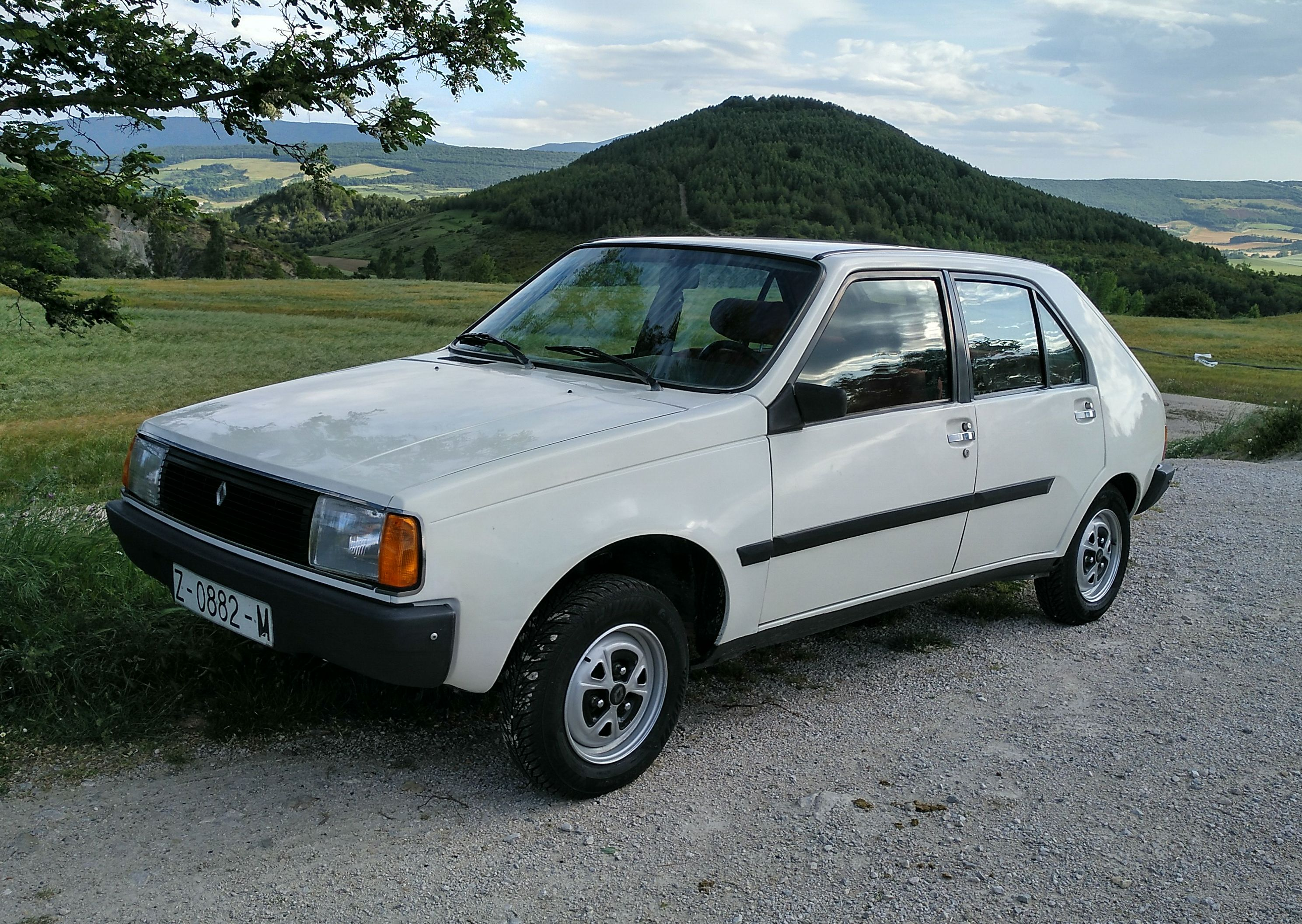

Overview
- Manufacturer: Renault
- Production: June 1976–1983
- Assembly: France: Douai (Douai plant); Belgium: Haren (RIB); Spain: Palencia (FASA-Renault); Yugoslavia: Novo Mesto (IMV)

Body and chassis
- Class: Small family car (C)
- Body style: 4-door hatchback
- Layout: FF layout

Powertrain
- Engine: 1219 cc XZ I4; 1360 cc XY I4
- Transmission: 4-speed manual

Dimensions
- Wheelbase: 2,530 mm (100 in); 2,560 mm (101 in)
- Length: 4,025 mm (158.5 in)
- Width: 1,624 mm (63.9 in)
- Height: 1,405 mm (55.3 in)
- Curb weight: 855 kg (1,885 lb) – 890 kg (1,962 lb)

Chronology
- Predecessor: Renault 6
- Successor: Renault 9 & 11

The Renault 14 is a small family car produced by the French manufacturer Renault between 1976 and 1983. It was first shown in January 1976 with production beginning in June of that year.

It was the first car to be produced in large volumes at the company's then new plant at Douai, although small pilot runs of the Renault 5 had preceded the 14's production in the factory.

== History ==
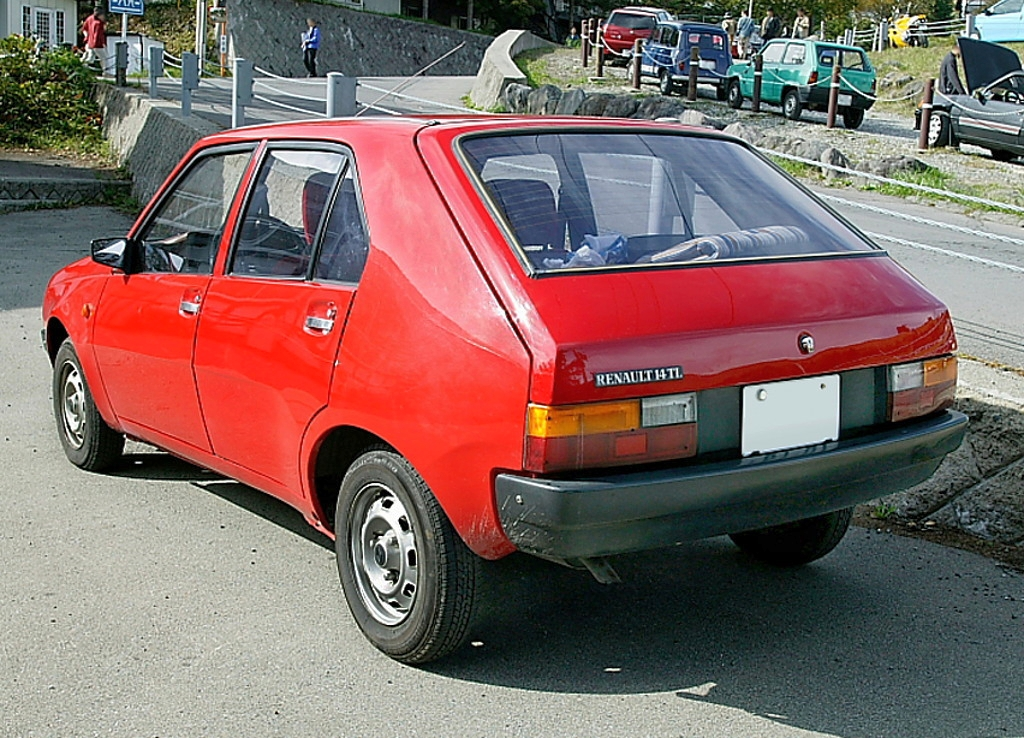
Renault 14 rear

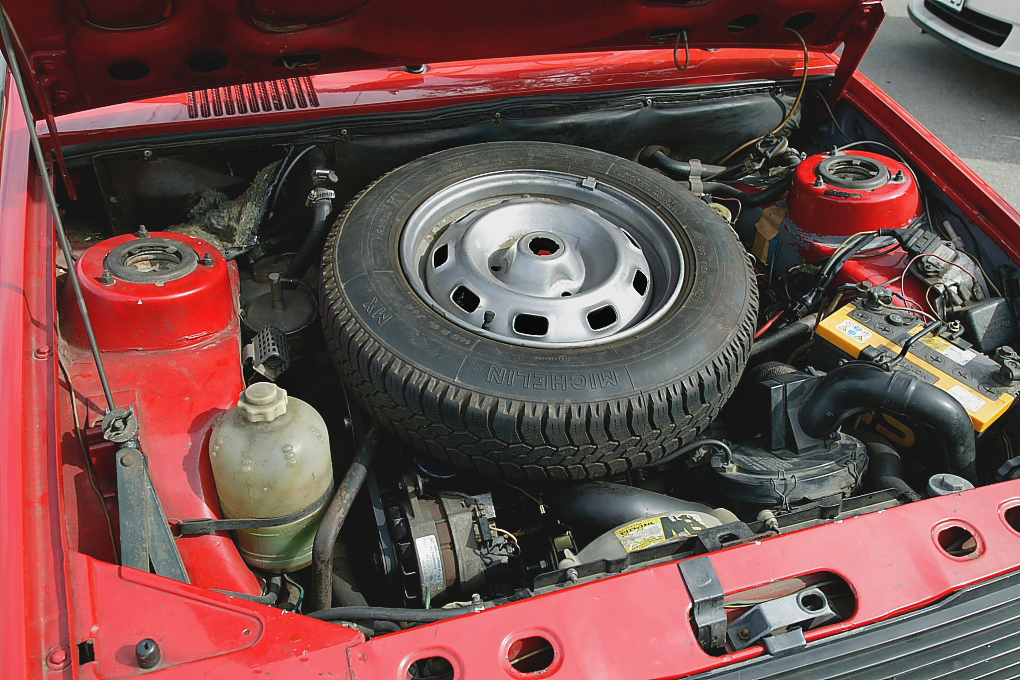
Renault 14 engine bay

Featuring front wheel drive, the 14 was developed to compete in the small family hatchback sector, which had been popularized by the launch of the Volkswagen Golf in 1974. Initially, the 14 was available in L and TL trim levels with a 1.2 L single overhead camshaft engine and later 1.4 L versions with 60 PS (44 kW; 59 hp) (R14 GTL) or 70 PS (51 kW; 69 hp) (R14 TS) joined the line-up. Both units were the X-type engine (commonly known as the "Douvrin" or "Suitcase Engine") jointly developed with Peugeot, although the 14 turned to be the only Renault vehicle that used the unit. The design was generally well thought out and practical with interior space a major selling point, including a rear seat that could either be folded or removed completely. In addition, the spare wheel was carried at the front, under the bonnet and above the transverse 4-cylinder engine that was inclined backwards by 72°. Although all Renault cars were by now front wheel drive, the 14 was the first of the manufacturer's models to incorporate a space saving Mini-like transversely mounted engine. The exterior styling of the Renault 14 was praised by the motoring press as being fresh and ahead of its time.

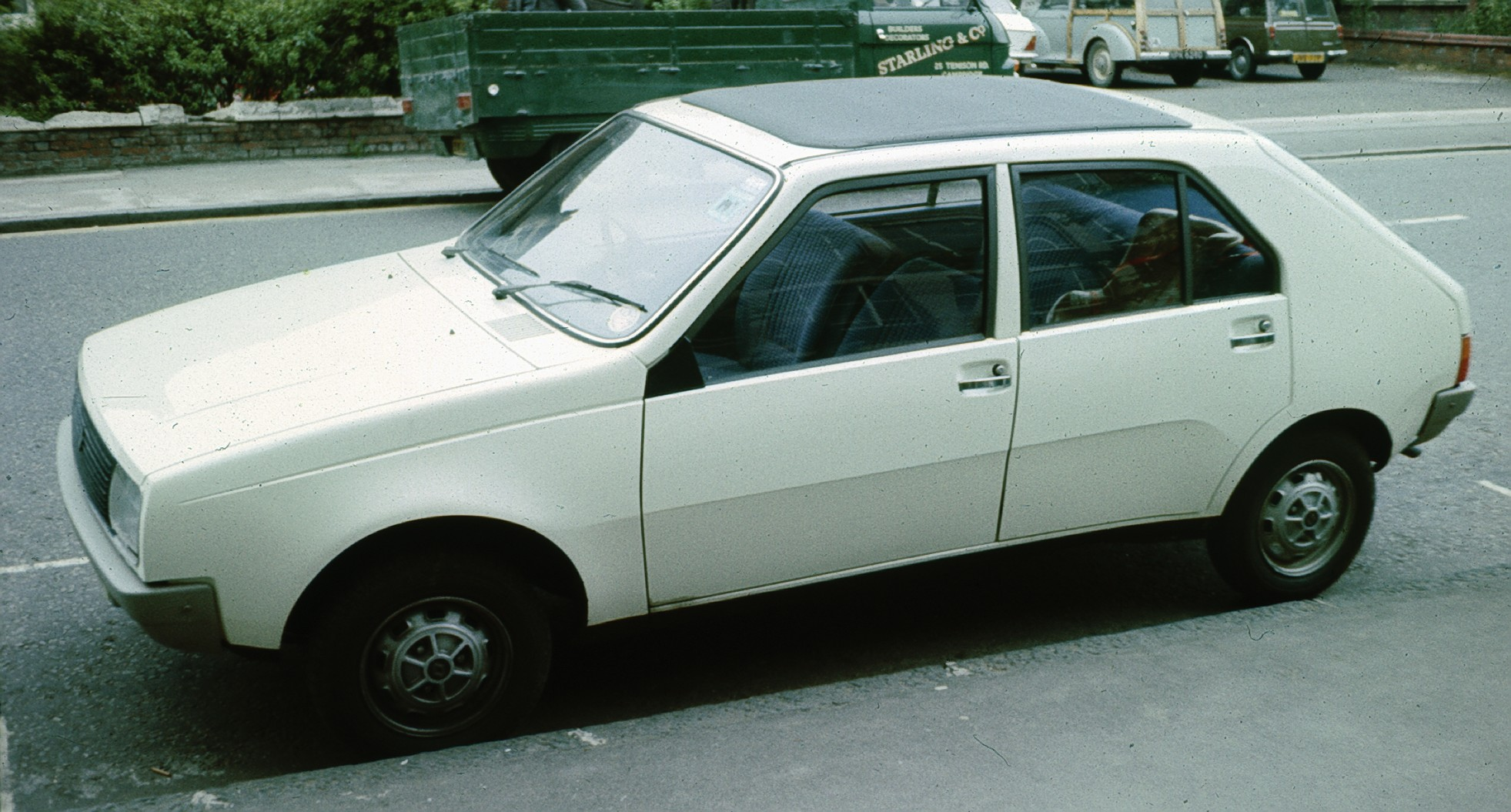
Renault 14 side view

The 14 shared with several previous Renault models a rear suspension system using two full-width torsion bars positioned one behind the other, along with the resulting wheelbase difference of more than 1 inch (32 mm) between the left and right sides of the car.

For 1979 Renault sought to compensate for a slow start in the marketplace, widening the range upmarket with a "GTL" version of the car, taking its wheels and some other ornaments and interior styling cues from the newly launched Renault 18, and a "TS" with twin chamber carburetor and claimed power increase from 57 hp (43 kW) to 70 hp (52 kW). The TS model also included halogen headlamps and electric windows in the front, the latter being a first for this class of car in the French market.

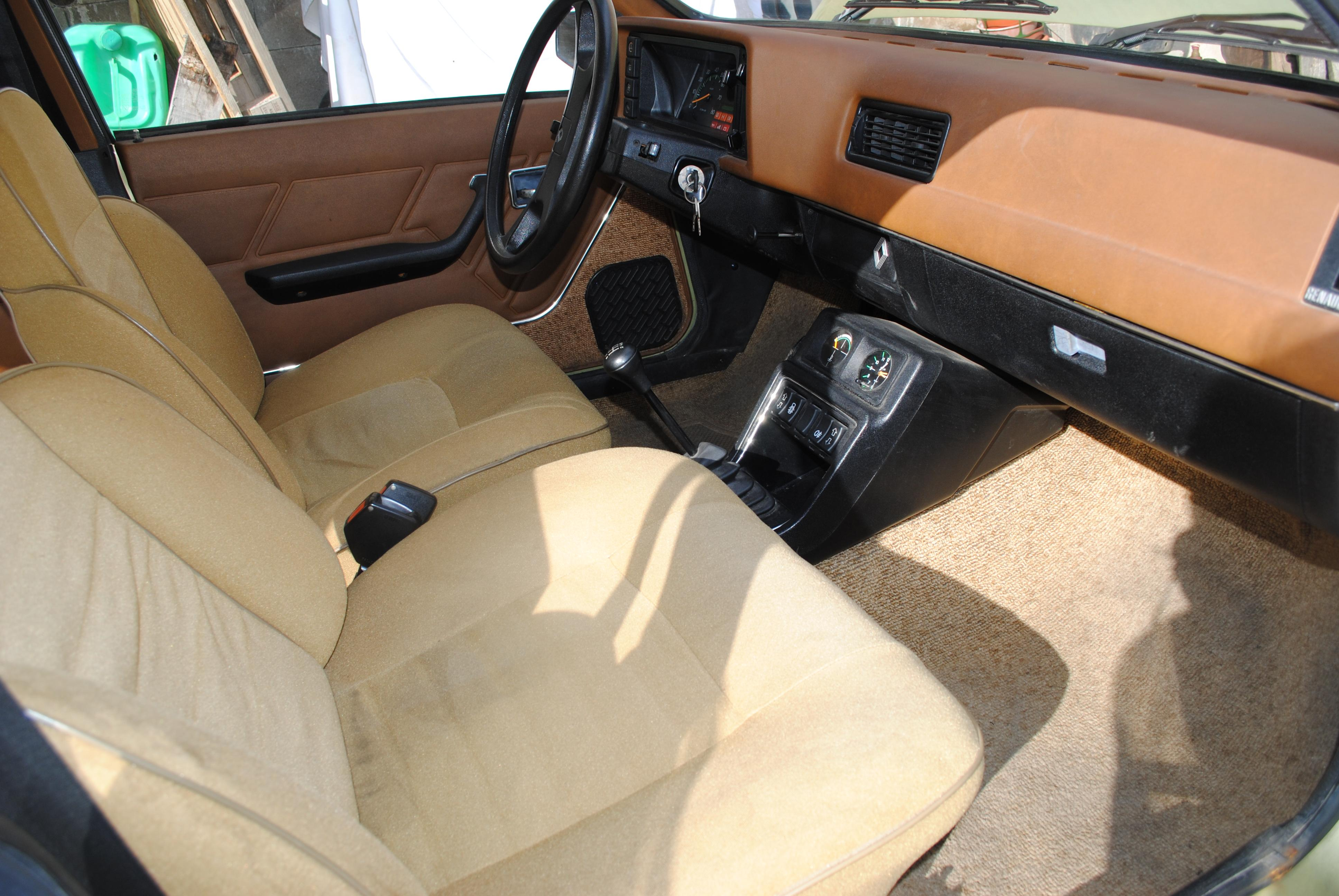
Renault 14 TS interior

The Renault 14 may have been one of the first front-wheel drive hatchbacks of its size to be produced in Europe, but within four years of its launch it was facing fierce competition from a growing number of similar products from rival manufacturers, particularly the Ford Escort MK3, Opel Kadett (Vauxhall Astra in the UK), Fiat Ritmo/Strada and Talbot Horizon. It was joined in the Renault range by the award-winning Renault 9 in 1981, the car which spawned the Renault 14's direct successor (the Renault 11) two years later.

=== "The Pear" ===
Sales of the 14 were hampered by an advertising campaign that compared it to the shape of a pear in order to hammer home the benefits of the advanced packaging with plenty of room for passengers and luggage. A preview at the Pompidou Centre in Paris as a bare bodyshell also did little to win customers. The car would later gain a reputation for premature body corrosion, which resulted in the 14 being dubbed the "rotten pear" by the motoring press. In France, "La poire"' (literally "the pear", but also slang for "gullible") still refers to the 14. However, the best-selling Renault 5 also had a reputation for premature body corrosion, but the stronger advertising of the R5 helped boost its sales and resulted in it being a sales hit.

The car also had a reputation for being difficult to start in damp conditions. The absence of a temperature gauge, or placement of it on the transmission tunnel behind the gear-lever, rather than on the instrument panel where it was directly in the driver's field of view, led to incidents of engine damage if the engine overheated and the driver failed to notice.

== Relaunch ==
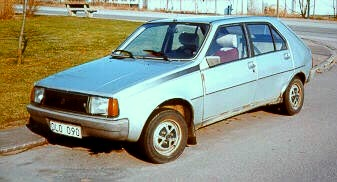
Launched in October 1979, 1980 models featured repositioned direction indicators

For 1980, Renault attempted to improve sales by relaunching the car with improved equipment levels and a minor facelift that included, most obviously from the outside, repositioned front indicators and reworked front fenders. This proved insufficient, and production ended in 1983 with precisely 993,193 units sold over a period of just under seven years. Initial production was 325 cars per day, which had been scheduled to increase to 700 in 1977 and to nearly 1,000 in 1978. This never materialised, as sales peaked very early in the R14's life. Sales in the domestic French market did improve somewhat with the redesign. The R14 is now a rare sight on the roads of Europe, even in its native France where they tended to last longer due to easy parts availability through the extensive dealer network. Many Renault 14s were used by the French police in the 1980s.

Its joint successors, the 9 and 11 appeared in 1981 and early 1983, respectively. The front end of the pre-facelift Renault 9 looked similar to the front end of the post-facelift Renault 14. However, both the Renault 9 and 11 had more conservative exterior body styling.

As of 2018, just nine Renault 14s remained taxed and on the roads in the UK.

== Engine ==
Version	Engines	Engine types			Displacement	Bore(mm) / Stroke (mm)	Power	Food	Fuel
		Designation Française de Mécanique	Designation Renault	Designation PSA					
L - TL - GTL	" X-type engine "	129	X5G (*)	XZ5	1218 cc	75 x 69	57 ch(¹) / 58,5 ch(²)	Body carburetor	Gasoline
TS phase 1	" X-type engine "	145	X6G (*)	XZ5X	1218 cc	75 x 69	69 ch	Dual body carburettor	Gasoline
GTL (³)	" X-type engine "	150D	X5J	XY7	1360 cc	75 x 77	60 ch	Body carburetor	Gasoline
TS phase 2	" X-type engine "	150	X6J (*)	XY6B	1360 cc	75 x 77	70 ch	Dual body carburettor	Gasoline
(¹) Phase 1, (²) Phase 2, (³) GTL Phase 2 from 1982.

(*) These names have never been used, it is an extrapolation of these engines on the new Renault engine designation system.

In the beginning, Renault and Peugeot used the same motor types (Française de Mécanique designations), in the 1980s, each used its own designations.

The "X engine" type X5J (1360 cm3) of the Renault 14 GTL (from 1982) is the only one to benefit from the new Renault designations. The designation of the engines is organized in 3 characters: a letter, a number, a letter (Example: C1J, X5J, F2N ...).

- The first letter designates the engine block: X ("X engine") or C ("Cleon-Fonte engine") ...;
- The number corresponds to the type of engine: 5 for hemispherical cylinder head gasoline, single body carburetor; 6 for hemispherical head gasoline, dual body carburetor; ...
- The last letter corresponds to the cubic capacity:

- G from 1150 to 1249 cc
- J from 1350 to 1449 cc

== Timeline ==
- 1976 – The Renault 14 was launched in L and TL trim levels, both of which came with a 1.2 litre Peugeot engine.
- 1979 – The higher-specification R14 TS was added to the lineup, providing more power thanks to a twin-chamber carburetor.
- 1979 – Model name changes: the R14 L became the R14, while the R14 TL became the R14 GTL.
- 1980 – The R14 TS gained a larger 1.4 litre engine.
- 1980 – The R14 LS was added, featuring the 1.4 litre engine from the TS but a more basic equipment specification like the R14.
- 1982 – The R14 GTL got a lower-powered economy-tune version of the 1.4 litre engine from the LS and TS.
- 1983 – Production of the R14 ended; the car was replaced by the Renault 9/11.
