= Peugeot 104 =

Car model

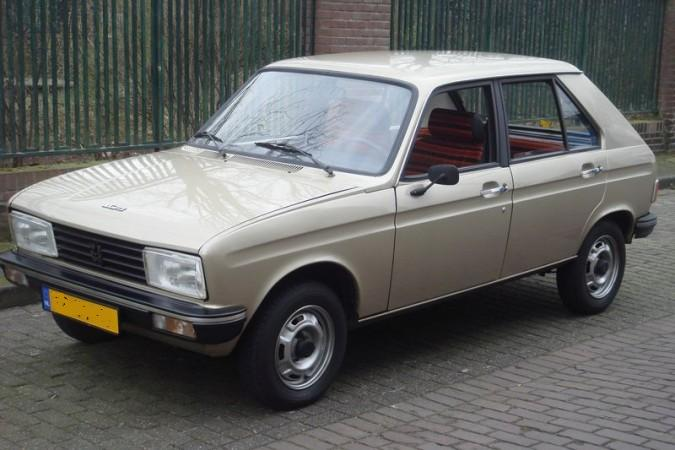
- 1979 Peugeot 104S 5-door

Overview
- Manufacturer: Peugeot
- Production: 1972–1988
- Assembly: France: Mulhouse (Peugeot SA Mulhouse Plant), Poissy (Peugeot SA Poissy Plant); Tunisia: La Marsa (STAFIM)
- Designer: Paolo Martin at Pininfarina

Body and chassis
- Class: Supermini (B)
- Body style: 4-door saloon (1972–1976); 3-door hatchback (1974–1988); 5-door hatchback (1976–1988)
- Layout: FF layout
- Related: Citroën LN / LNA; Citroën Visa; Talbot Samba

Powertrain
- Engine: 954 cc XV I4; 1,124 cc XW I4; 1,219 cc XZ I4; 1,360 cc XY I4

Dimensions
- Wheelbase: 2,419 mm (95.25 in) (4/5 door); 2,230 mm (87.81 in) (3 door)
- Length: 3,600 mm (141 in) (4/5 door); 3,283 mm (129.25 in) (3 door)
- Width: 1,520 mm (59.8 in)
- Height: 1,391 mm (54.75 in) (4/5 door); 1,340 mm (52.75 in) (3 door)

Chronology
- Successor: Peugeot 106; Peugeot 205

The Peugeot 104 is a supermini car produced by the French company Peugeot between 1972 and 1988. It was designed by Paolo Martin and was initially only sold as a four-door saloon car, with a three-door hatchback variant introduced in 1974 and a five-door hatchback version replacing the saloon in 1976. The 104 was the first model produced at the company's Mulhouse plant. It was also the first new Peugeot introduced since 1955 not to be offered in a diesel version.

== Production history ==
=== Saloon (1972) ===
The 104 was introduced at the September 1972 Paris Motor Show. On its launch, the Peugeot 104 was offered as a compact four-door fastback. Although it had a short, sloping rear end that suggested a hatchback, there was originally a separate boot/trunk, as on a conventional saloon. Power was provided from a 954 cc Douvrin engine called the PSA X engine, an all-aluminium alloy, chain driven overhead cam, with gearbox in the sump, sharing engine oil, which was jointly developed with Renault. This transmission-in-sump arrangement was similar to that pioneered by the British Motor Corporation in the Mini. It gave good levels of economy and refinement, and was mounted leaning backwards, at a 72-degree angle. The car also had an impressive chassis which made ride and handling excellent.

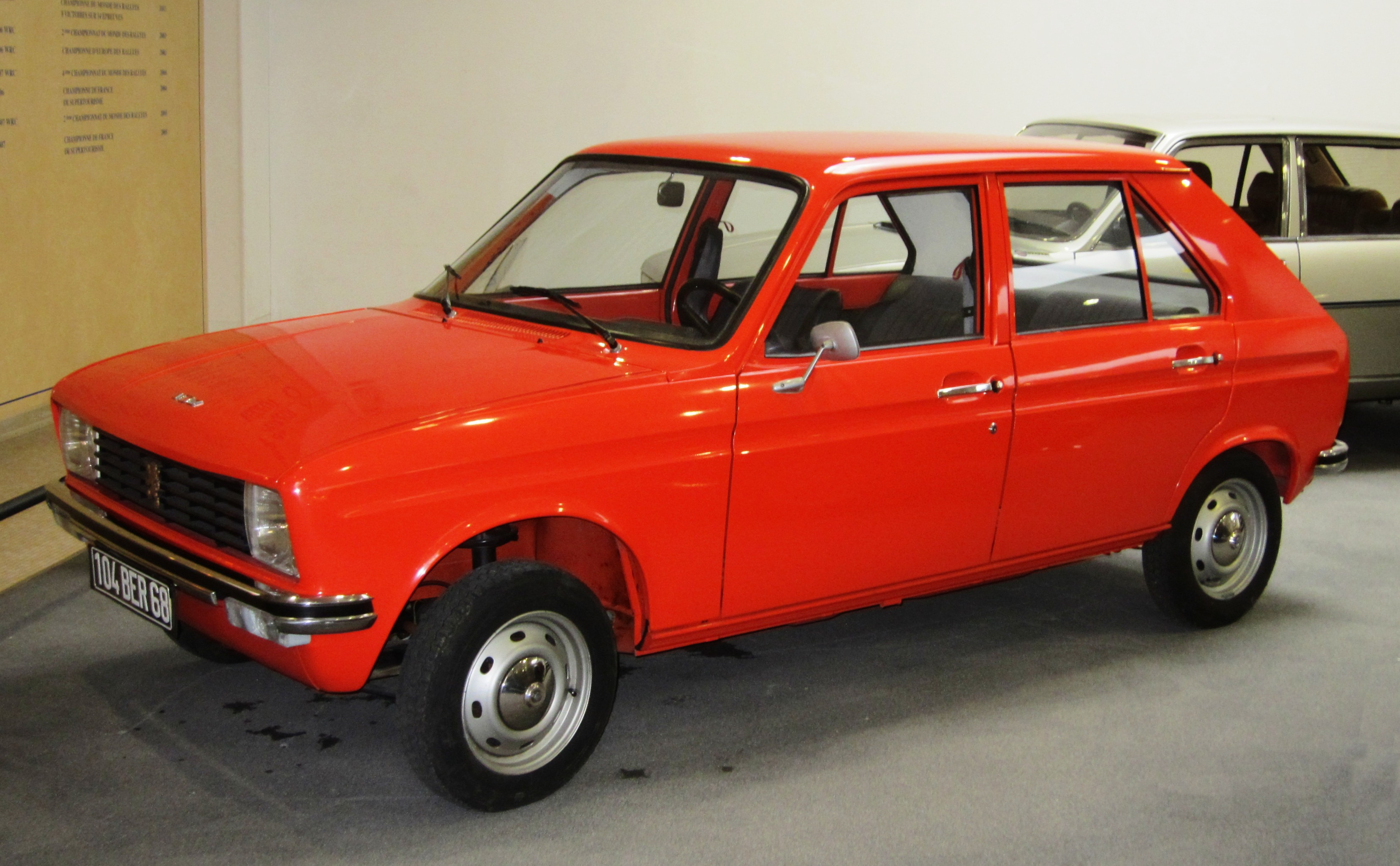
The 104 was originally available only with a four-door booted body. The hatchback version appeared four years later

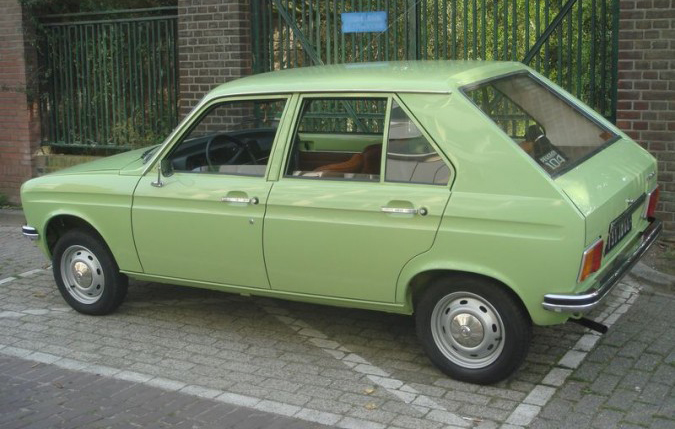
1972–1976 Rear

=== Coupé (1973) ===
A three-door coupé was launched on a shortened chassis at the 1973 Paris Motor Show, featuring the same 954 cc engine as the saloon. Headlights were larger and rectangular in shape, rather than square. Originally sold as the "104 Coupé", the shorter wheelbase models later received names beginning with a "Z" (e.g. ZL, ZA, ZS2). Equipment levels which begin with a "G" or an "S" were used for the longer four/five-door variants.

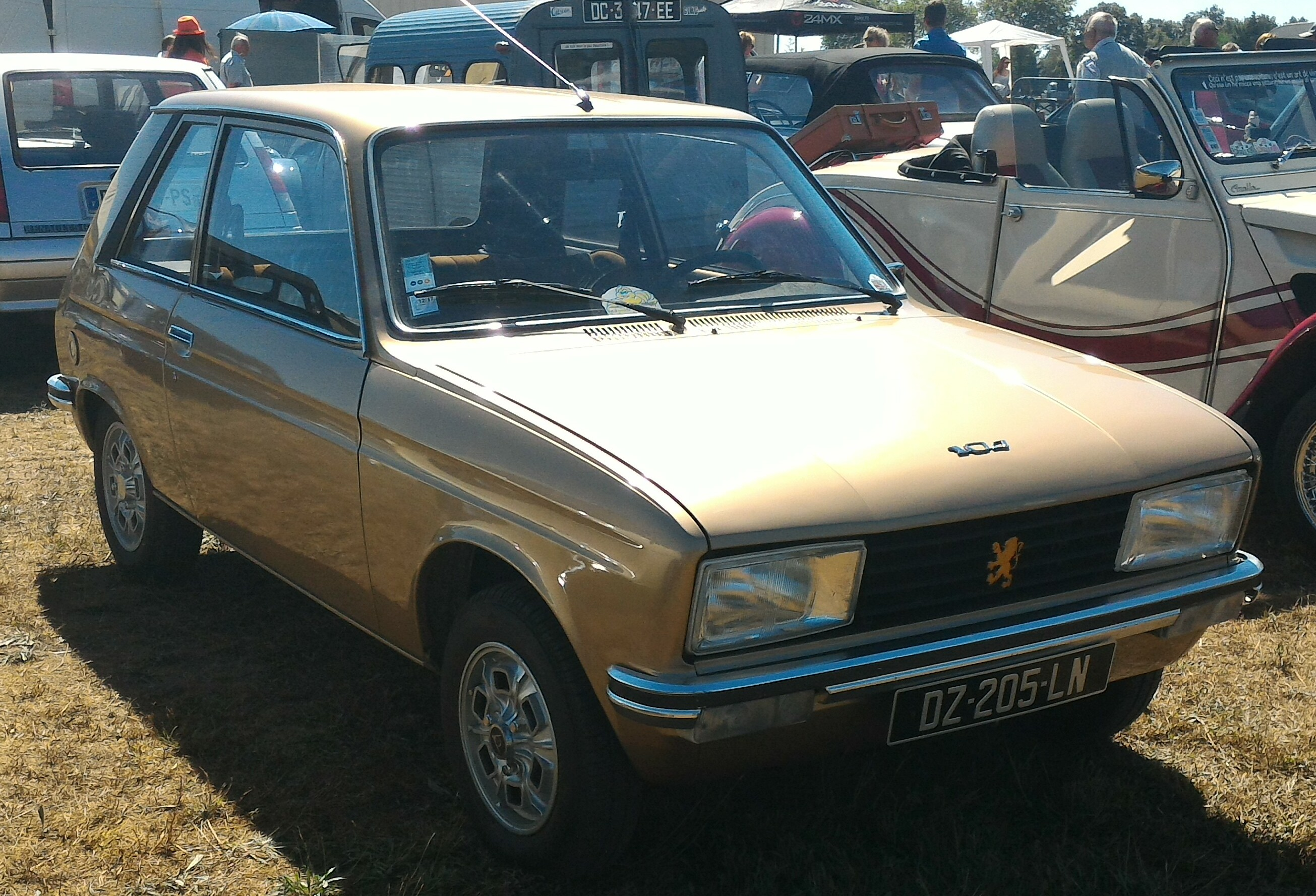
1973–1978 Coupé

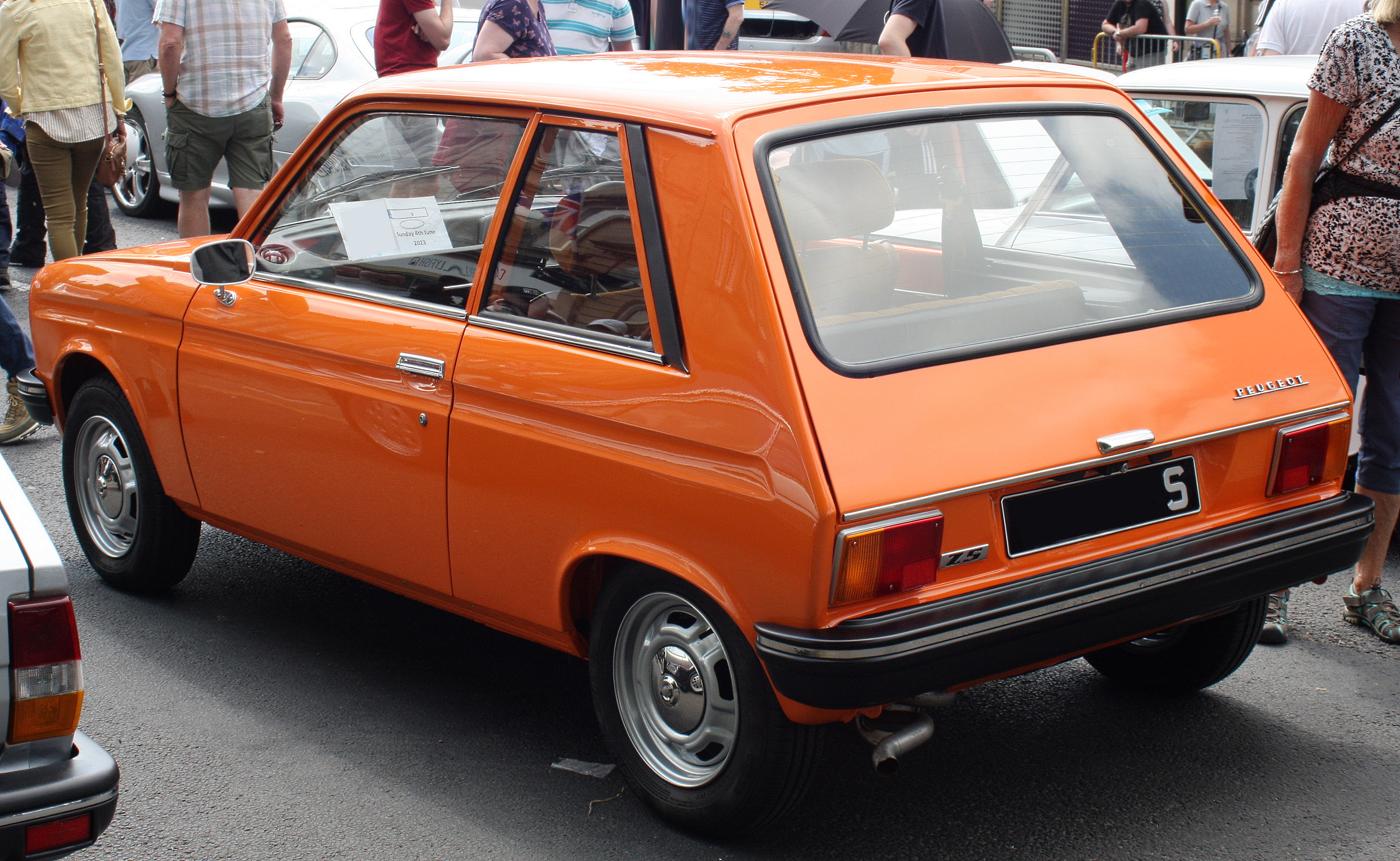
1977 Coupé rear

=== 1976 facelift ===
A facelift in July 1976 saw the four-door saloon replaced with a five-door hatchback. Peugeot had been afraid that a five-door 104 would steal sales from the old-fashioned 204 Break, but with production of the 204 coming to an end in July 1976 this was no longer a concern. Rear light clusters were modified slightly with indicators that wrapped around to the sides of the car, and a 1.1-litre engine was introduced. The coupé was made available in two versions, the ZL and also the more powerful ZS with 66 PS. A modified camshaft on the 954 cc engines also retarded the valve timing in order to favour fuel economy at the price of a slight power reduction. The revised models only appeared in right-hand drive form at the end of the year. 1977 proved to be the most successful year for the 104, with 190,000 being built.

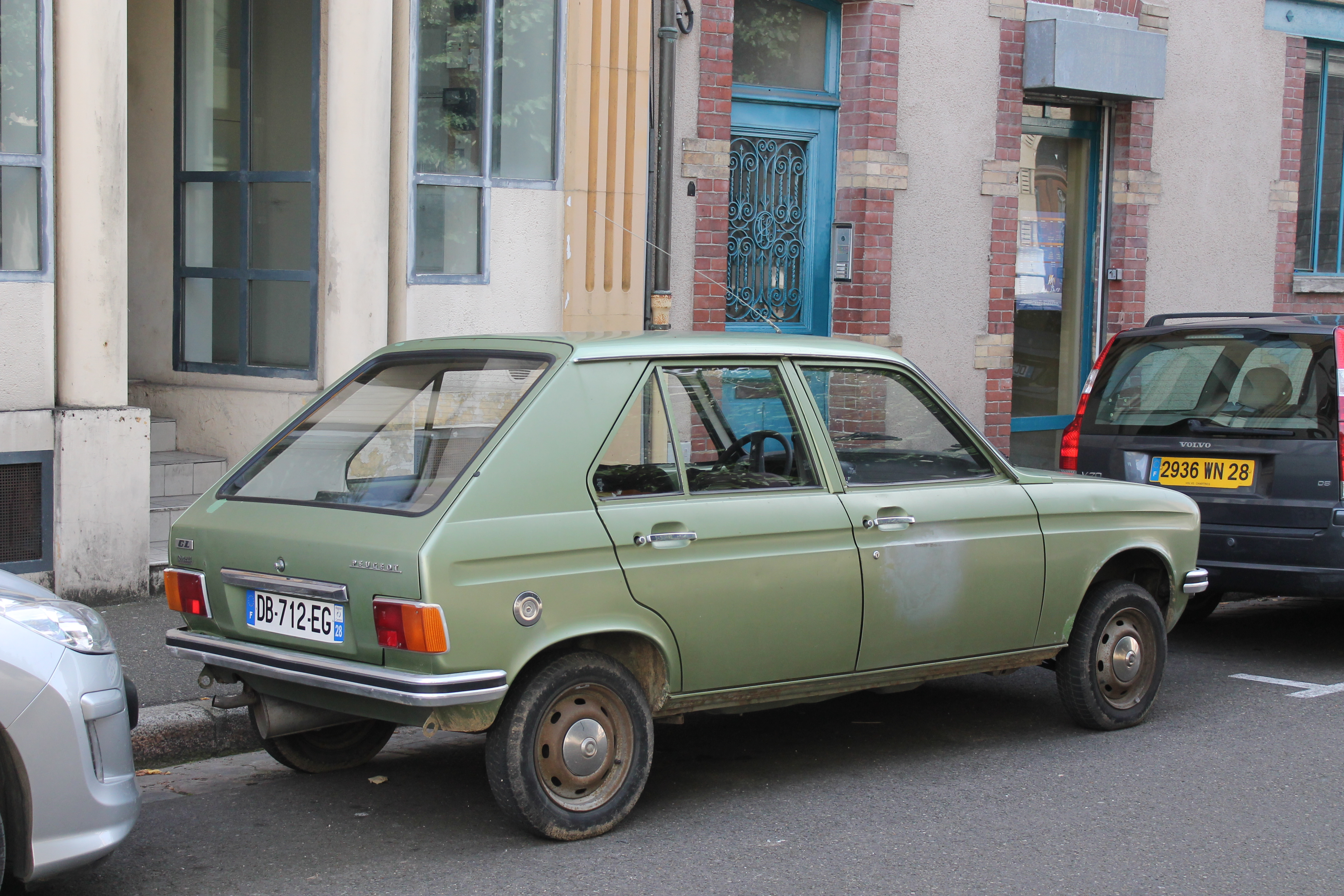
1976 facelift (Note the wrap around rear indicators)

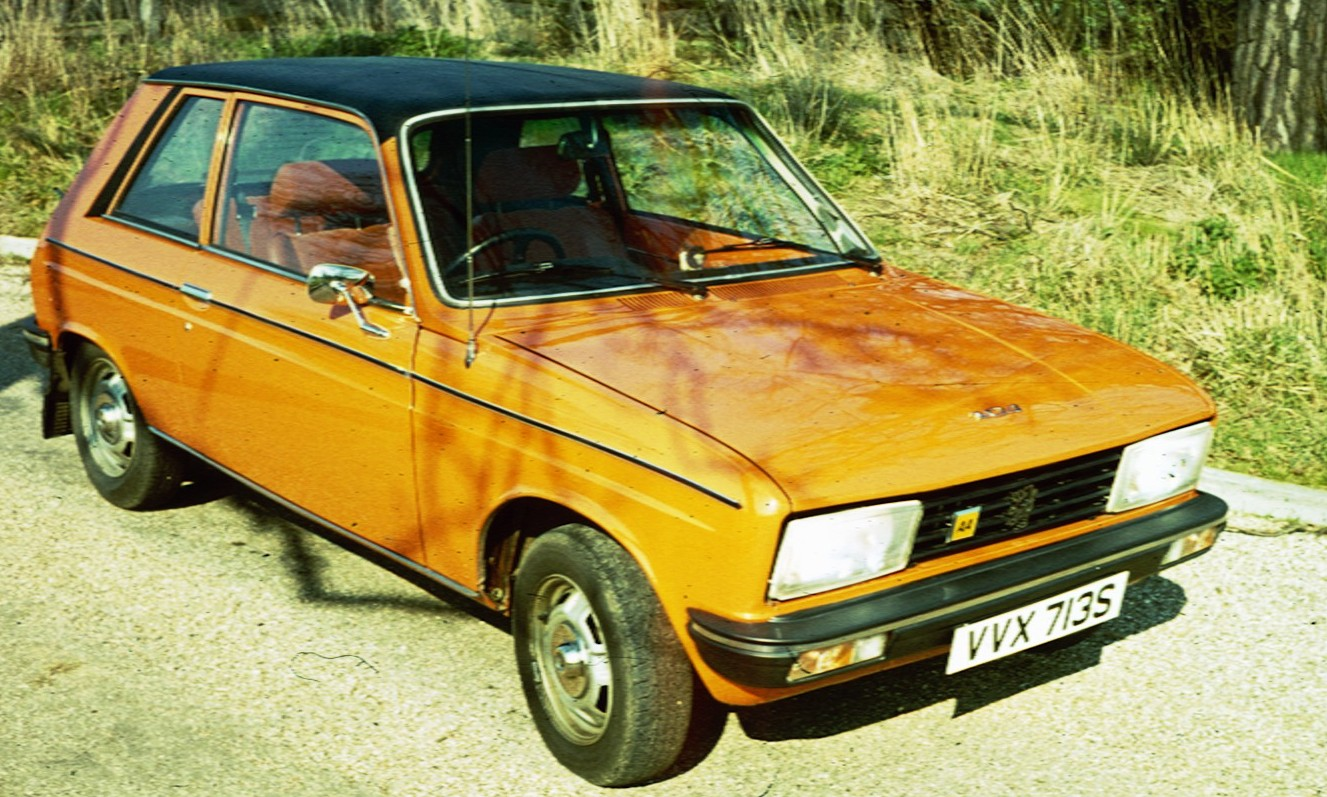
The 104ZS introduced in 1976 was promoted as the sporting Peugeot 104

=== 1978 facelift ===
The coupé gained a third (cheaper) commercial variant with only two seats, the ZA, and all coupé variants were given larger rear light clusters with integral reversing lights. Higher specification five-door models gained the larger headlights and grille introduced for the coupé. The more powerful engine from the ZS was briefly available in the five-door hatchback "Sundgau" special edition, of which 1,200 examples were built in March and April 1978. For 1979 the ZL Coupé was upgraded to a 57 PS (42 kW) version of the 1,124 cc engine.

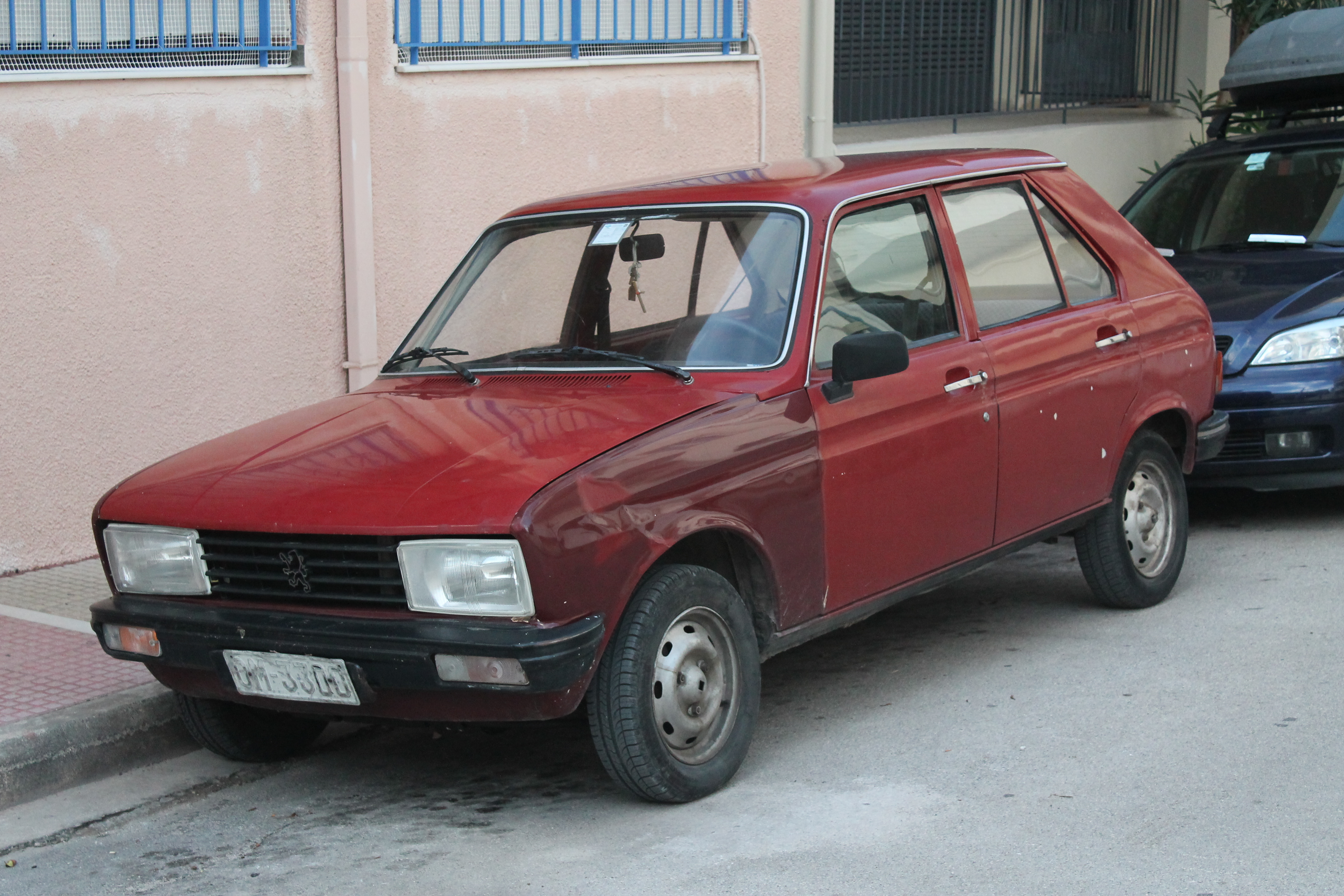
1978 facelift (Note the larger headlights and shorter grille borrowed from the coupé)

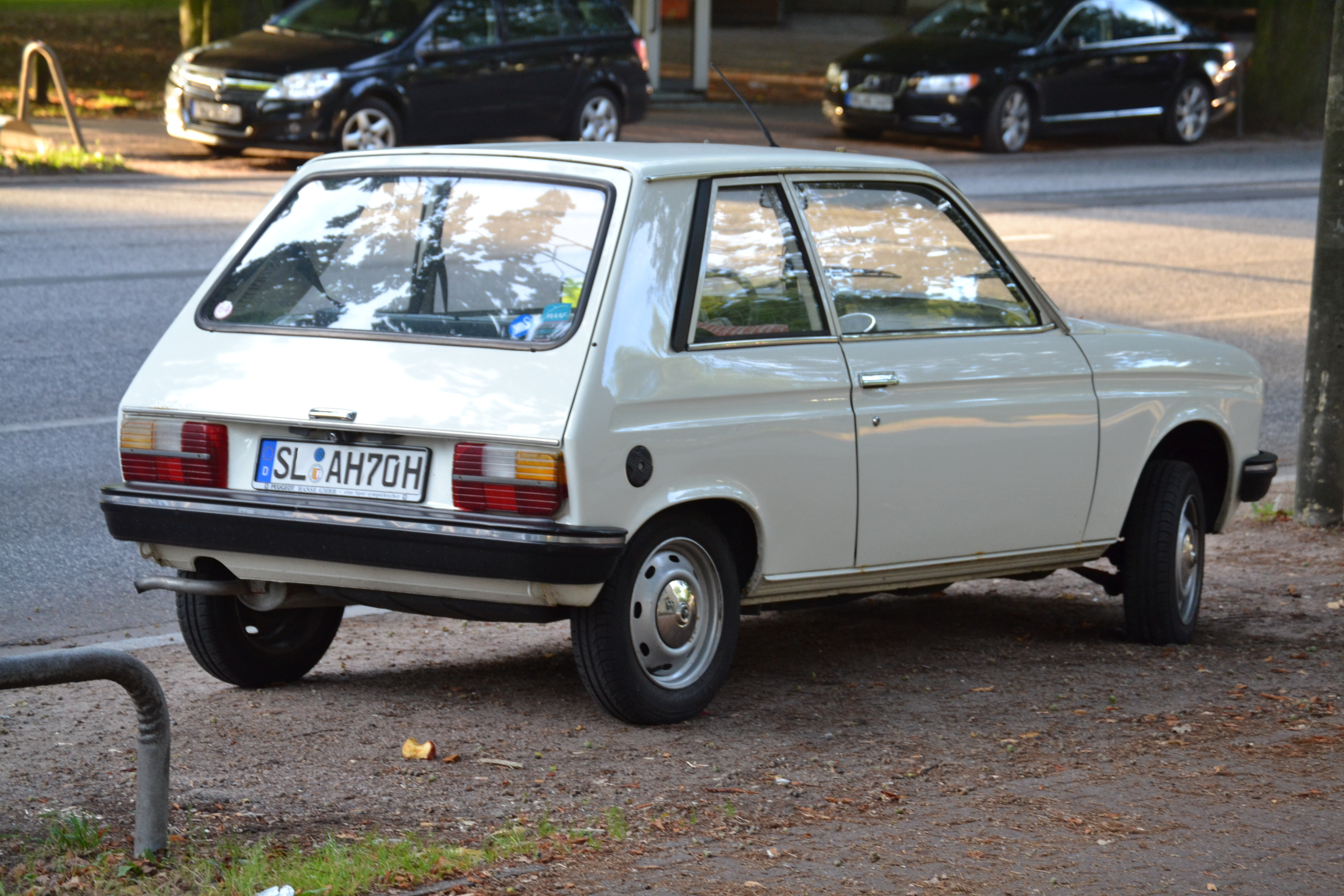
1978 facelift Coupé (Note the larger rear light clusters)

=== 1980 facelift ===
The 1980 facelift was minor, with model designations changing in line with other vehicles in the Peugeot line-up. However, a 1.2-litre engine was now also offered (in the SR), with the same power as the lesser 1.1.

=== 1982 facelift ===
This facelift incorporated smaller headlights, a new grille and for the 5-door hatchback rear light clusters that included reversing lights. The amount of chrome trim was reduced and generally replaced by black plastic. At the end of summer, the ZS coupé variant was given an 80 PS (59 kW; 79 hp) 1,360 cc engine to improve its performance. The existing 72 PS version remained on sale at a lower price until the 1984 model year was introduced. The power gain was achieved by using two carburetors rather than one double-barrel unit.

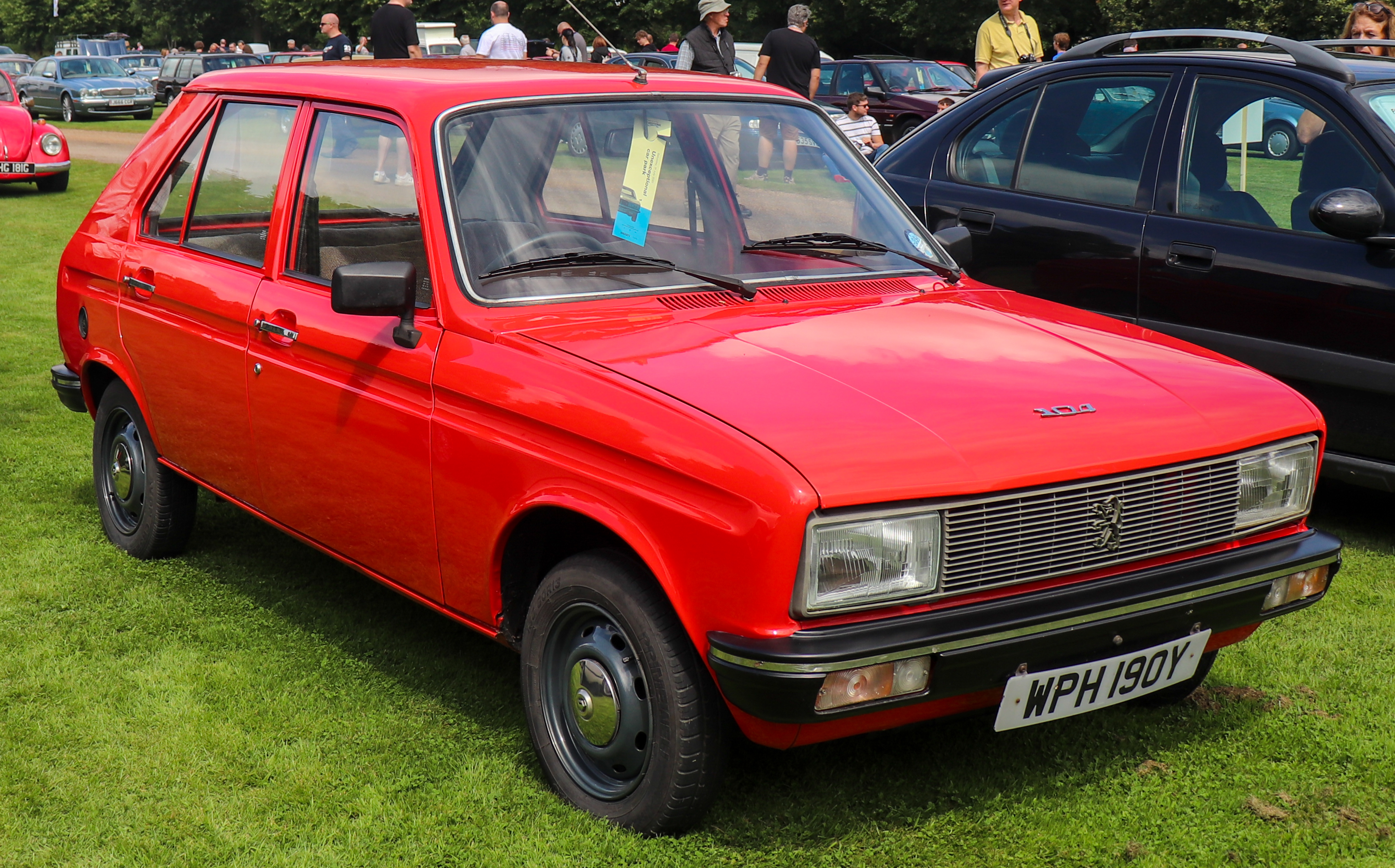
1982 facelift (Note new grille and rear light clusters)

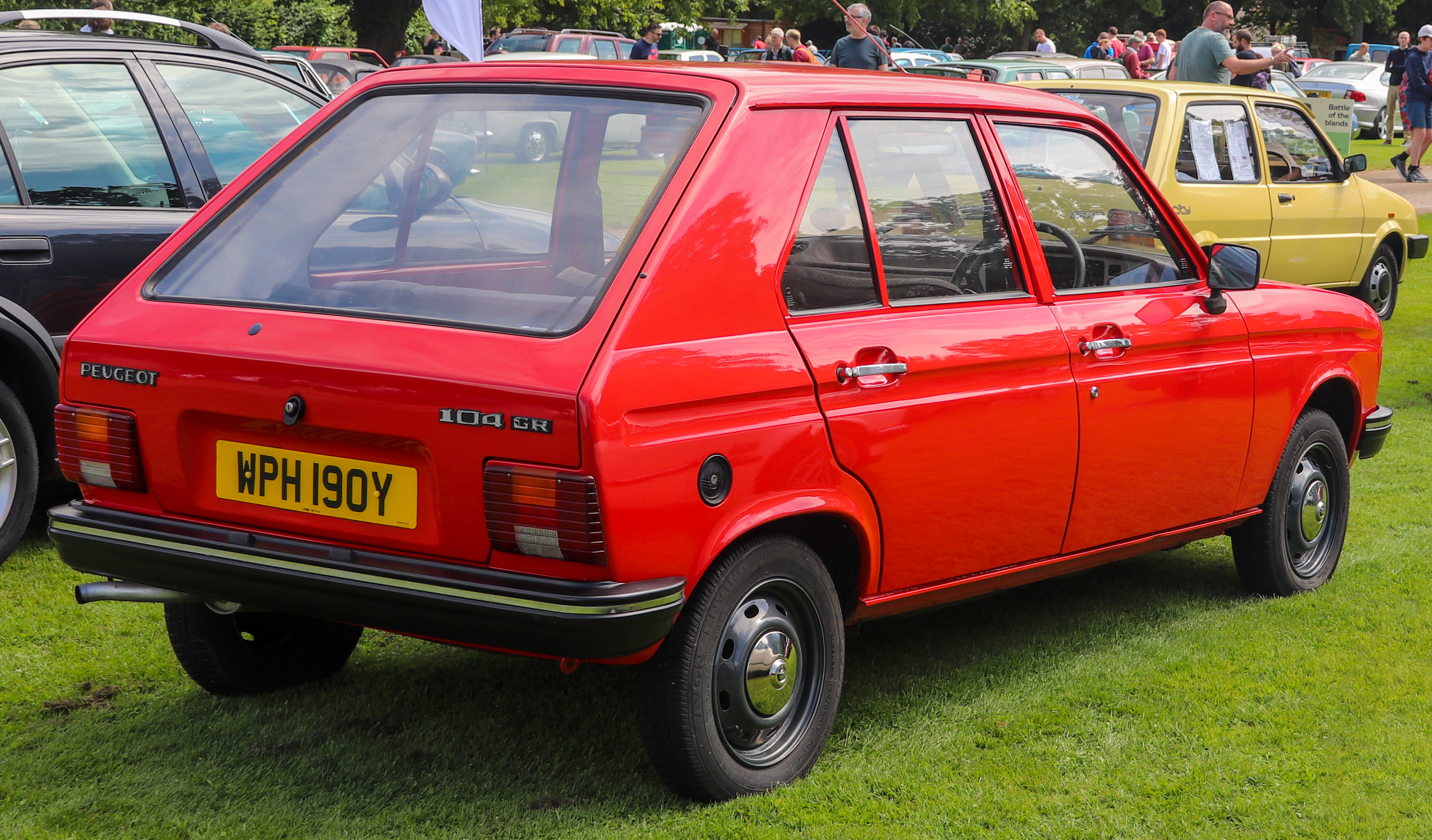
1982 facelift

=== 1983 on ===
In 1983, the number of models offered was reduced to make way for the new 205 and exports to most foreign markets gradually came to an end. It remained on sale in France until the end of production in 1988. The sporting ZS remained on sale until late 1985; for the 1986 model year only the 50 PS (37 kW) 1,124 cc engine remained. There was a minor facelift in 1987, introducing a new grille with three body-coloured horizontal bars and anthracite bumpers - now without a chrome band. The Z, Style Z, and five-door GLS continued to be available with this engine in the home market until 1988.

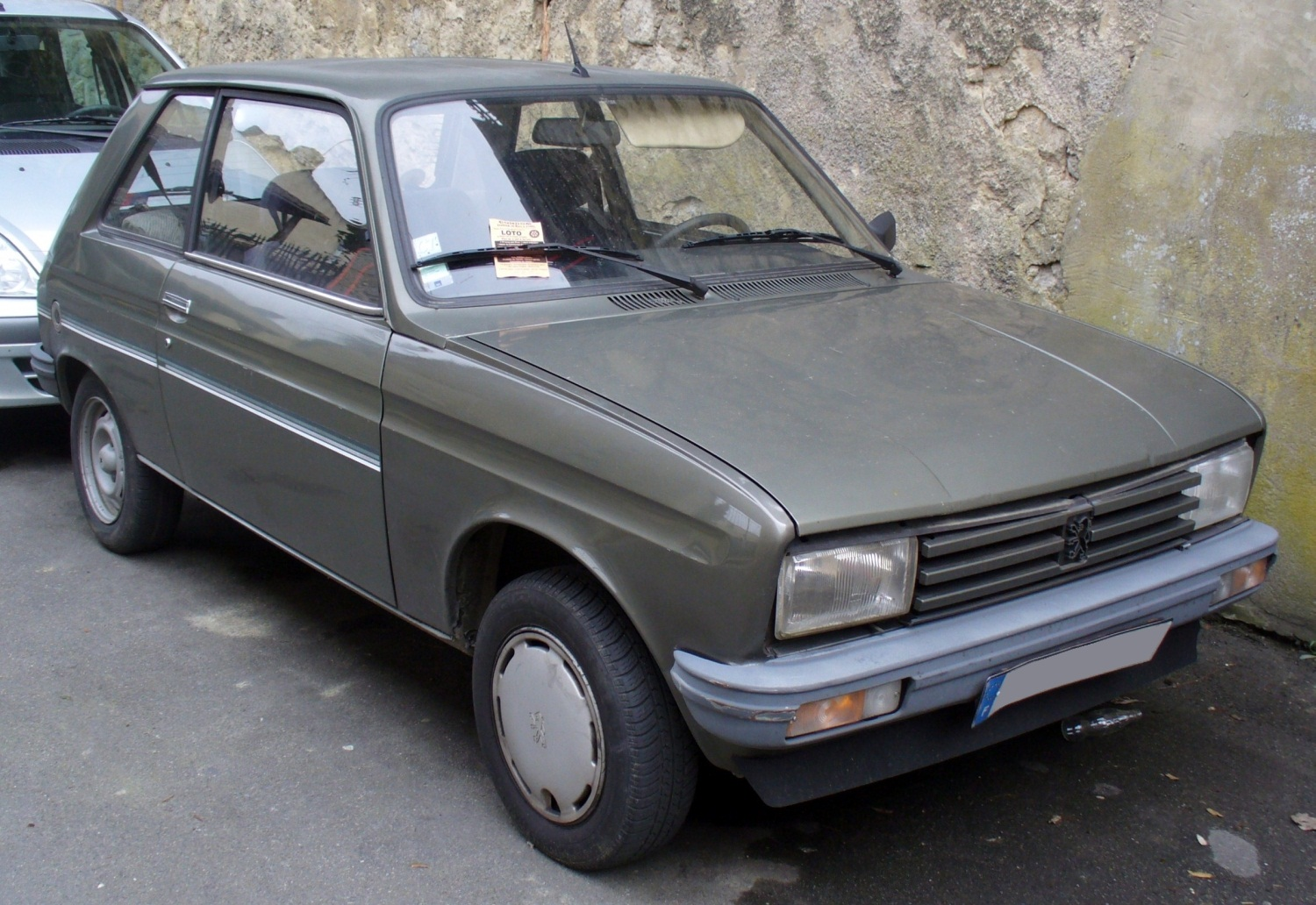
1987–1988 Coupé (Note the different grille)

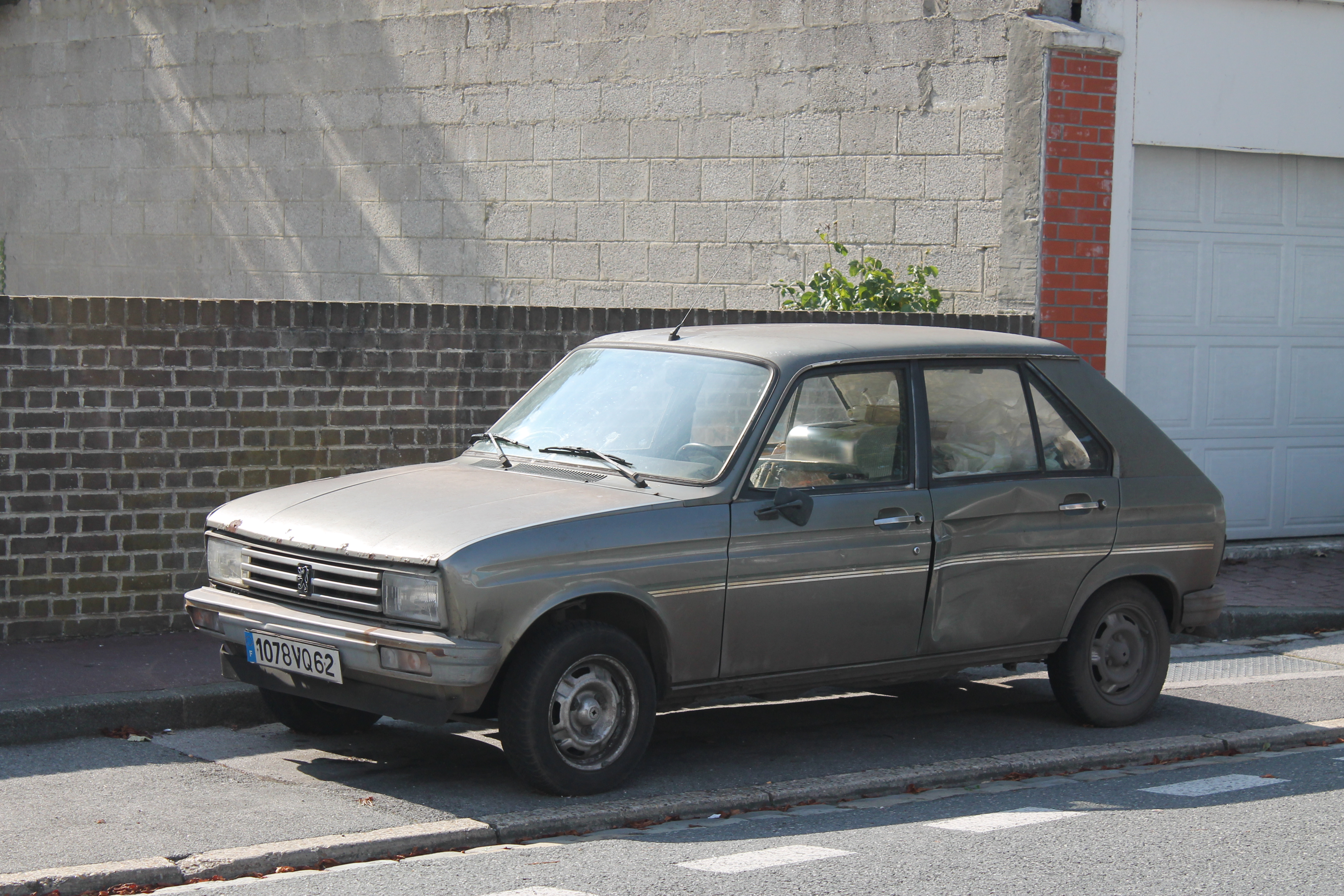
1987–1988 5-door model

=== ZS 2 ===
A limited run of 1,000 sporting ZS 2s were built in 1979. They were powered by a 93 PS (68 kW) 1,360 cc four-cylinder engine.

== Prototypes ==
Several prototypes based on the 104 are known to exist. Different power sources were tried out, including electric in 1975 and diesel. The M18 prototype (circa 1976) was a blue 5-door estate, with rear light clusters similar to those that were used on the 504 estate. The M23 was a dark red 3-door van concept based on the saloon rather than the existing 3-door coupé. A yellow three-box saloon (pictured) is also known, as is a white pick-up truck and the "Peugette" - a roadster prototype built on the 104 ZS platform.

Prototypes

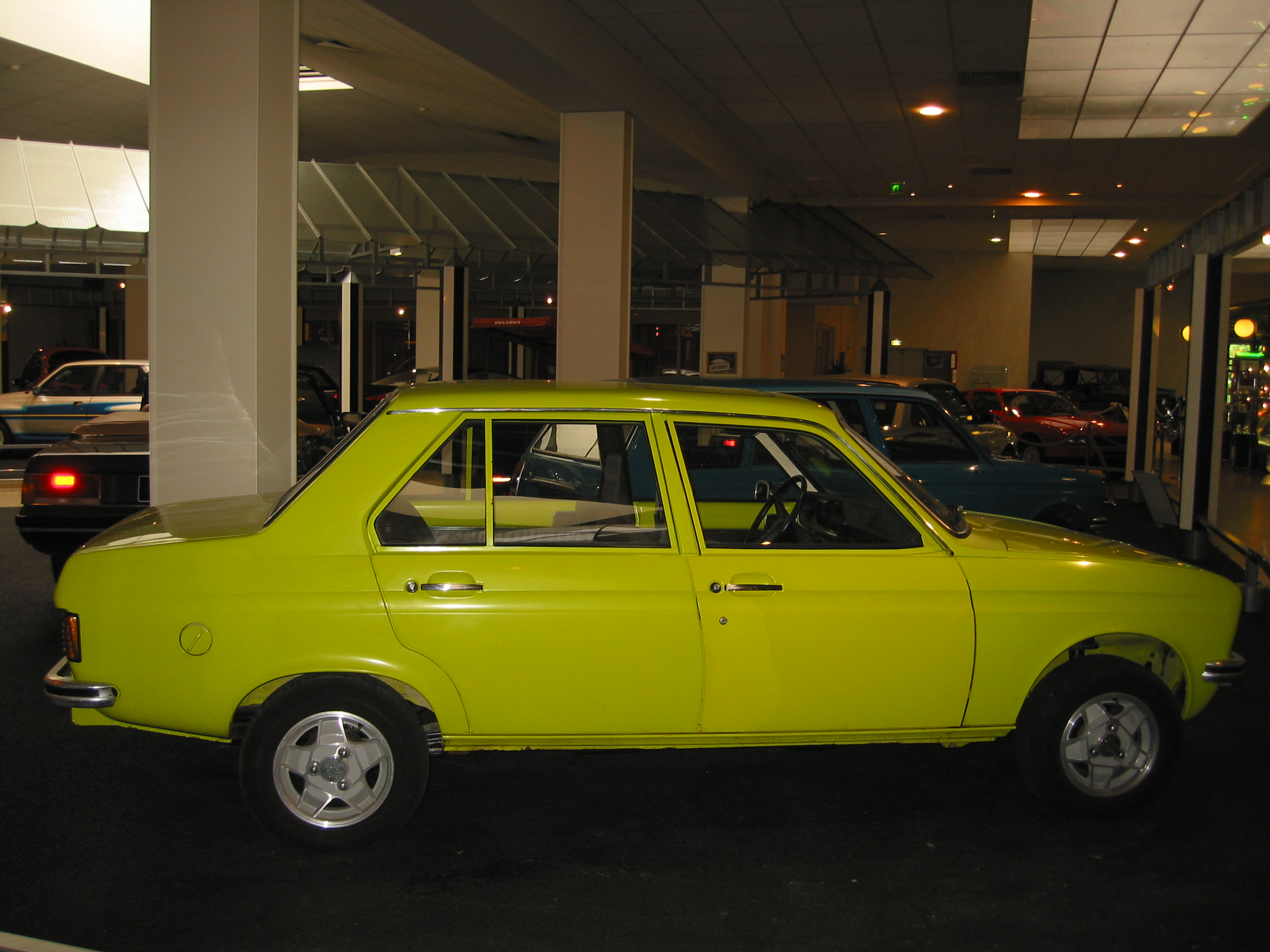
Three-box saloon in profile

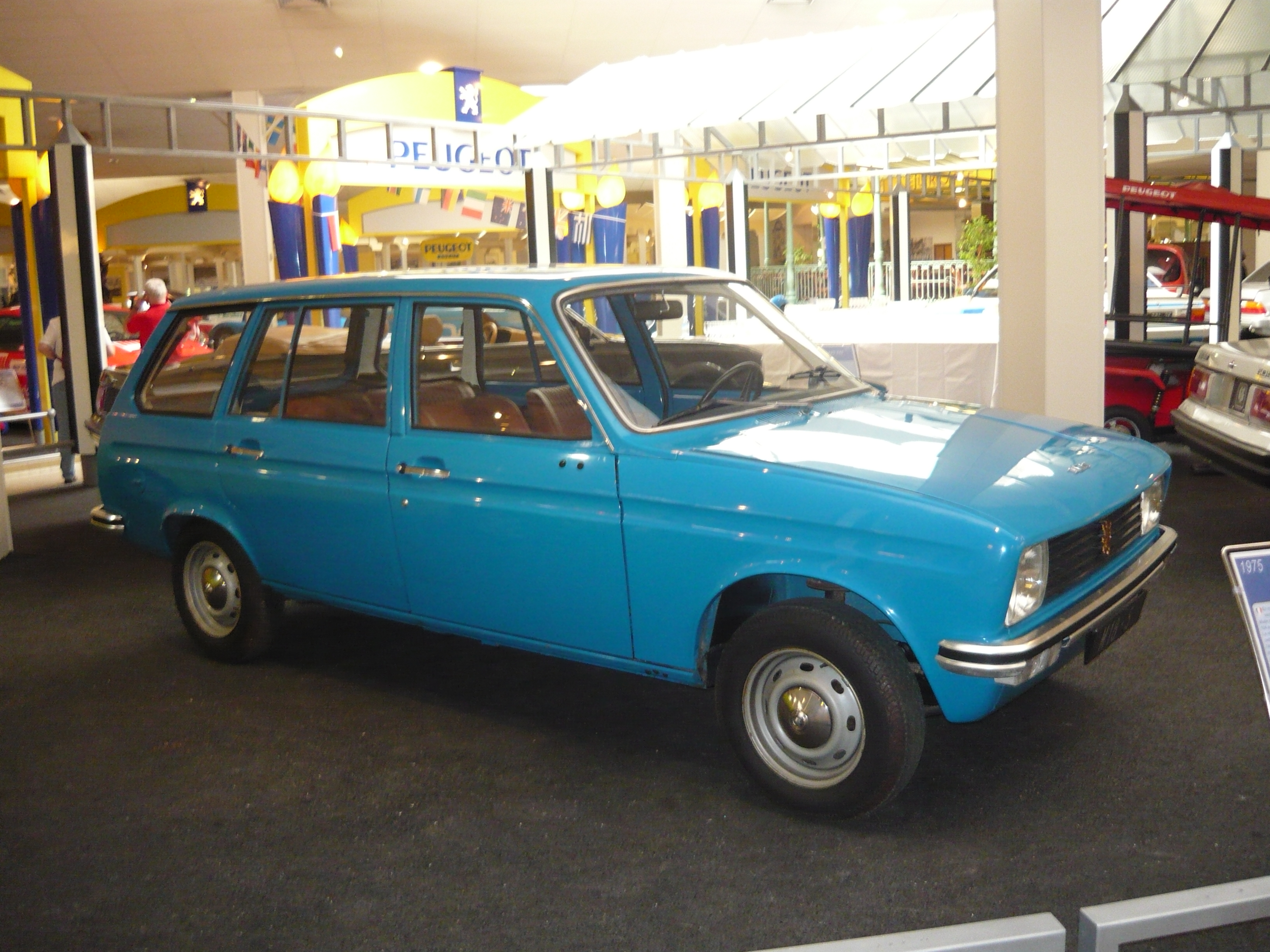
Estate

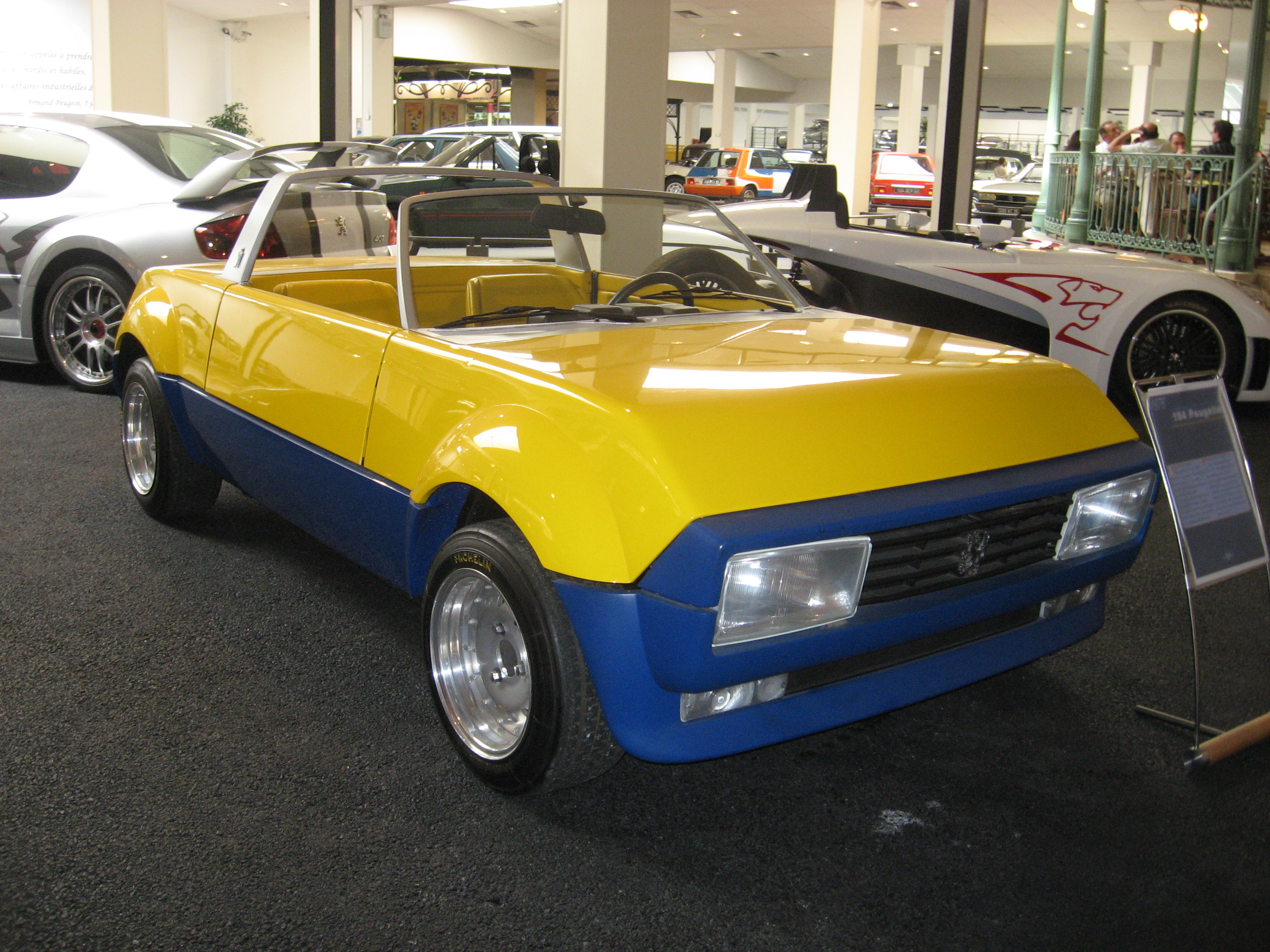
Peugette roadster

=== Electric Prototype ===
In 1975, Peugeot partnered with Alstom and EDF to produce 7 prototypes with electric power (4 coupes and 3 vans). This led to the beginning of the modern electric movement for Peugeot, and they continued to refine the idea with the J5 and J9 utility vehicles. Finally, the Peugeot 205 was the start of their full scale attempt to perfect their electric cars and once the Peugeot 106 was released, an electric version was sold to the public.

== Related cars ==
=== Citroën LN / LNA ===
After Peugeot assumed control of Citroën in 1975, forming the PSA Group, the 104 coupé bodywork was shared with the 602 cc two-cylinder engined Citroën LN. In 1982 this car was fitted with the more modern 652 cc engine of the Visa in 1983 to become the LNA, before production ended in 1985.

=== Citroën Visa ===
The mechanical configuration of the 104 (with longer travel suspension), was also used in the Citroën Visa, leading to the abandonment of the Citroën Prototype Y plan for the Visa, although that plan went on to be used on Romanian-built cars. The Visa, unlike the LN / LNA, had its own distinctive body style and packaging. It remained in production until 1988, the same year as the 104's demise. The Citroën C15 box van version of the Visa was in production with updated engines and transmissions until 2005.

=== Talbot Samba ===
A derivative of the 104 coupé with a slightly longer rear section, the Talbot Samba was launched in 1981, following Peugeot's acquisition of Chrysler Europe (and its Talbot marque) in 1978. A cabriolet version of the Samba was developed. Production lasted until 1986.

== Market impact and replacement ==
The Peugeot 104 was one of the most successful European small cars of the 1970s but it was starting to show its age against more modern rivals by the turn of the 1980s. When Peugeot launched the stylish all-new 205 in 1983, the 104 was withdrawn from most European markets, but it continued in France as a budget choice until production finally ceased in May 1988 after 16 years, in which time 1,624,992 Peugeot 104s had been built. 345,849 of these were the short wheelbase Coupé versions.

As of 2019, only 12 Peugeot 104s remain taxed and on the roads in the United Kingdom with 24 on SORN.
