= PSA-Renault X-Type engine =

X engine
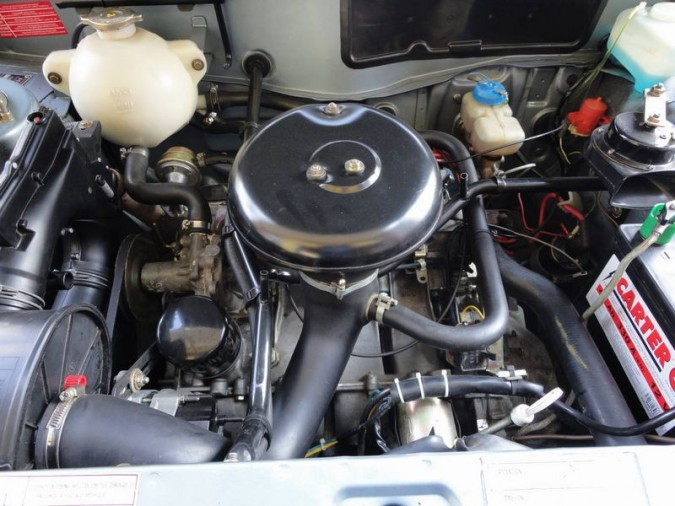
- 1980 Peugeot 104 SR engine

Overview
- Manufacturer: Française de Mécanique
- Production: 1974–1982

Layout
- Configuration: Naturally aspirated Inline-4
- Displacement: 1.0–1.4 L (954–1,440 cc)
- Cylinder bore: 70 mm (2.76 in); 72 mm (2.83 in); 75 mm (2.95 in); 76 mm (2.99 in)
- Piston stroke: 62 mm (2.44 in); 69 mm (2.72 in); 77 mm (3.03 in)
- Cylinder block material: Aluminium alloy
- Cylinder head material: Aluminium alloy
- Valvetrain: SOHC 2 valves x cyl.

Combustion
- Fuel system: Carburettor
- Fuel type: Petrol
- Cooling system: Water-cooled

Output
- Power output: 33–110 kW (45–150 PS; 44–148 hp)

Chronology
- Successor: PSA TU engine

The PSA X engine is a family of internal combustion engines used in Citroën, Peugeot, Talbot and Renault automobiles. The X family was mainly used in superminis and the entry-level models of mid-size cars. It was designed and manufactured by the company "Française de Mécanique", a joint venture created by Peugeot (as predecessor to Groupe PSA) and Renault in 1969, and built in Douvrin in northern France. It is commonly called the "Suitcase" engine, the "Douvrin" nickname being commonly used for the bigger 2.0–2.2-liter J-Type engine, which was also built in Douvrin.

The X design was introduced in 1972 with the Peugeot 104. It was an all-aluminium alloy SOHC inline-four design with two valves per cylinder driven by a chain, using petrol as fuel. It was applied transversely in front wheel drive vehicles only, tilted by an almost horizontal attitude of 72 degrees. The integral transmission is mounted on the rear side of the crankcase (thus appearing to be underneath the power unit when it is mounted in the vehicle), and is driven by transfer gears which give a distinctive "whine" — a trait shared with the BMC A-Series engine, which uses a similar construction. Displacement ranged between 1.0 and 1.4 L (954 and 1,360 cc). The side mounting of the transmission onto the crankcase is what gives rise to the nickname "suitcase engine", as the transmission and engine assemblies resemble two halves of a suitcase when they are split for disassembly.

The X was used until 1990 in PSA vehicles — Renault discontinued the unit in 1982 when it reverted to its own Cléon-Fonte engine powerplants when the R14 was replaced by the R9/R11. It was replaced in PSA vehicles by the more modern belt driven camshaft TU which was introduced in 1986 in the Citroën AX. The TU engine was fitted with the now conventional end-on gearbox with separate lubrication. The TU engine is an evolution of the X engine.

| Engine types (Française de Mécanique) | 108 | 109 — 121 | 129 — 145 | | 150 |
| Designation PSA | XV | XW | XZ | XL | XY |
| Designation Renault | | | X5G(*) — X6G(*) | | X5J — X6J(*) |
|---|---|---|---|---|---|
| Displacement | 954 cc | 1124 cc | 1219 cc | 1288 cc | 1360 cc |
| Bore (mm) | 70 | 72 | 75 | 76 | 75 |
| Stroke (mm) | 62 | 69 | 69 | 71 | 77 |

(*) These names have never been used, it is an extrapolation of these engines on the new Renault engine designation system.

In the beginning, Renault and Peugeot used the same motor types (Française de Mécanique designations), in the 1980s, each used its own designations.

The "X engine" type X5J (1360 cc) of the Renault 14 GTL (from 1982) is the only one to benefit from the new Renault designations. The designation of the engines is organized in 3 characters: a letter, a number, a letter (Example: C1J, X5J, F2N ...).

- The first letter designates the engine block: X ("X engine") or C ("Cleon-Fonte engine") ...;
- The number corresponds to the type of engine: 5 for hemispherical cylinder head gasoline, single body carburetor; 6 for hemispherical head gasoline, dual body carburetor; ...
- The last letter corresponds to the cubic capacity:

- G from 1150 to 1249 cc
- J from 1350 to 1449 cc

== XV ==
The XV had a displacement of 1.0 L (954 cc), with a bore and a stroke of 70 mm × 62 mm (2.76 in × 2.44 in). It used a single barrel carburettor, good for 33 kW (45 PS; 44 hp).

The XV was installed in the Citroën LNA, Citroën Visa, Peugeot 104, Peugeot 205 and Talbot Samba.

| Model | Output | Notes |
|---|---|---|
| XV8 | 33 kW (45 PS; 44 hp) | 1-bbl. carburettor |

== XW ==
The XW had a displacement of 1.1 L (1,124 cc), with a bore and a stroke of 72 mm × 69 mm (2.83 in × 2.72 in). It was initially powered by a single barrel carburettor, good for 42 kW (57 PS; 56 hp). A double-barrel carburettor version (XW 3S) raised power to 48.5 kW (66 PS; 65 hp). A detuned version with 37 kW (50 PS; 50 hp) was used in a few markets in place of the XV.

The XW was applied to the Citroën LNA, Citroën Visa, Citroën C15, Citroën BX, Peugeot 104, Peugeot 205 and Talbot Samba. The 66 PS (49 kW; 65 hp) version could be found in the sporty Visa X and the 1975 Peugeot 104 ZS.

| Model | Output | Notes |
|---|---|---|
| XW3 | 42 kW (57 PS; 56 hp) | 1-bbl carburettor |
| XW7 | 37 kW (50 PS; 50 hp) | 1-bbl carburettor |
| XW3S | 48.5 kW (66 PS; 65 hp) | 2-bbl carburettor |

== XZ ==
The XZ had a displacement of 1.2 L (1,219 cc), with a bore and a stroke of 75 mm × 69 mm (2.95 in × 2.72 in). It was powered by a single barrel carburettor, achieving 42 kW (57 PS; 56 hp) at launch, later 47 kW (64 PS; 63 hp) for the Visa Super X. The XZ7R variant used two double barrel carburettors which raised power to 66 kW (90 PS; 89 hp).

The XZ had a brief career, and was applied to the Citroën Visa, Peugeot 104, Talbot Samba and Renault 14. The 90 PS (66 kW; 89 hp) could be found in the Peugeot 104 ZS Coupé and Talbot Samba Rallye, and their respective racing versions.

| Model | Output | Notes |
|---|---|---|
| XZ5 | 42 kW (57 PS; 56 hp) | 1-bbl carburettor |
| XZ5X | 47 kW (64 PS; 63 hp) | 2-bbl carburettor |
| XZ7R | 66 kW (90 PS; 89 hp) | twin 2-bbl carburettor |

== XY ==
The XY was introduced in the place of the XZ. It had a displacement of 1.4 L (1,360 cc), with a bore and a stroke of 75 mm × 77 mm (2.95 in × 3.03 in). It was initially available only in a double barrel carburettor with 53 kW (72 PS; 71 hp), but later became available with single barrel, twin single barrel and twin double barrel carburettors. This one could reach 68.5 or 82 kW (93 or 111 PS; 92 or 110 hp), depending on the model it was meant for and the level of tuning.

The XY was applied in 44 kW (60 PS; 59 hp) to the Citroën Visa, Peugeot 104 and Peugeot 205, Talbot Samba and Renault 14 GTL. The 72 PS (53 kW; 71 hp) variant could be seen in deluxe versions of these models, such as the Samba Cabrio and 205 XT, the Citroën BX and the Renault 14 TS. The 80 PS (59 kW; 79 hp) version was reserved for the intermediate sports levels Visa GT, 205 XS/GT, Samba S and the 104ZS. The two most powerful variants were used exclusively in the Visa Chrono and Chrono II, which had a successful career in rallying, especially in France. A 1.4 L (1,440 cc) with over 110 kW (150 PS; 148 hp) was used in the Group B racing model used by the factory team.

| Model | Output | Notes |
|---|---|---|
| XY6B | 53 kW (72 PS; 71 hp) | 2-bbl carburettor |
| XY? | 82 kW (111 PS; 110 hp) | twin 2-bbl carburettor |
| XY7 | 44 kW (60 PS; 59 hp) | 1-bbl carburettor |
| XY8 | 58 kW (79 PS; 78 hp) | twin 1-bbl carburettor |
| XYR | 68 kW (92 PS; 91 hp) | twin 2-bbl carburettor |

== Sources ==
- Guide des moteurs Peugeot Citroën (in French)
