= Club =

Club may refer to:

== Artifacts ==
- Club (weapon), a blunt weapon
- Golf club, for golfing
- Indian club, for exercise
- Juggling club, for toss juggling
- Throwing club, for the athletic club throw
- Throwing club (or stick), a weapon

== Arts and entertainment ==
- Club music, a broad genre originated in the 1980s
- Club (magazine), a 1990s pornographic periodical
- Clubs (suit), in playing cards
- "Club" (song), a 2019 song by Kelsea Ballerini
- Club, a character in 1984 arcade game Yie Ar Kung-Fu
- IClub48, a 1994–1995 Indonesian variety TV show

== Brands ==
- Club (biscuit), a brand of biscuits manufactured by Jacob's (Ireland) and McVitie's (UK)
- Club (German cigarette), a German brand of cigarettes
- Club (soft drink)
- Club Med, a holiday company
- Club Crackers
- Kensitas Club, commonly known as Club, a Scottish brand of cigarettes
- Mega Club, a derivative of the Citroën AX

== Forms of organization ==
- Club (organization), a form of association
- Club (sport), a team or society to compete in sport competitions
- Boat club
- Book discussion club
- Book sales club, a marketing mechanism
- Cabaret club
- Gentlemen's club (traditional)
- Health club or fitness club, similar to a gym
- Nightclub, a late-night venue with dancing
- Rowing club
- Social club
- Sports club
- Strip club, an adult venue with nude dancers
- Student club
- Women's club
- Yacht club
- Youth club

== Mathematics ==
- Club set, a subset of a limit ordinal
- Clubsuit, a family of combinatorial principles

== Other uses ==
- Club (anatomy), part of the tail of some dinosaurs and mammals
- .club, a generic top-level Internet domain
- Club good, in economics
- Club sandwich, a dish

== See also ==
- Club foot (disambiguation)
- Country club (disambiguation)
- The Club (disambiguation)
