= Citroën C2 =

Overview
- Manufacturer: Citroën
- Production: August 2003 – October 2009
- Assembly: France: Aulnay-sous-Bois
- Designer: Donato Coco

Body and chassis
- Class: City car (A)
- Body style: 3-door hatchback
- Layout: FF layout
- Related: Citroën C3; Peugeot 1007; Peugeot 206

Powertrain
- Engine: 1.1 L TU1 I4; 1.4 L TU3 I4; 1.4 L ET3 I4; 1.4 L DV4 HDi I4; 1.6 L TU5 I4; 1.6 L TU5 JP4S I4 (C2-R2 Max); 1.6 L DV6 HDi I4
- Transmission: 5-speed automated manual transmission 5-speed manual

Dimensions
- Wheelbase: 2,314 mm (91.1 in)
- Length: 3,665 mm (144.3 in)
- Width: 1,664 mm (65.5 in)
- Height: 1,494 mm (58.8 in)
- Kerb weight: 932 kg (2,055 lb) - 1,050 kg (2,315 lb)

Chronology
- Predecessor: Citroën Saxo
- Successor: Citroën C1 (as a Citroën); Citroën C3 (as a Citroën); Citroën DS3 (for DS)

The Citroën C2 is a city car which was made by the French company Citroën from August 2003 until October 2009. It is a three-door hatchback with a front-engine, front-wheel-drive layout and was produced at the Aulnay factory on the outskirts of Paris. Along with the Citroën C3, the C2 replaced the popular, but ageing Citroën Saxo. The C2 and C3 have relatively different designs however retain the same dashboard, allowing Citroën to sell cars in different submarkets of the supermini class. The C2 was designed by Donato Coco. The C3 was originally designed as a larger "family-friendly vehicle", with its five doors, whereas the C2 aimed to project a "young driver" image with two doors and flatter styling. The C2 was discontinued in October 2009, and replaced by the Citroën DS3 in January 2010.

Unlike the Saxo, with 2 of 5 stars from Euro NCAP, the C2 achieved 4 out of 5 stars.

== Marketing and advertising issues ==
Unlike its sister models, the Citroën C1 and C3, the C2 was seen as a victim of poor advertising. According to many in the motoring press, it was the most neglected model in the Citroën lineup in terms of promotion. In comparison, the C1 and the C3, on which the C2 is based, were both well presented in the media. Despite that, the Citroën C2 was awarded the "Best European Hatchback of 2003" in September 2003.

== Versions ==
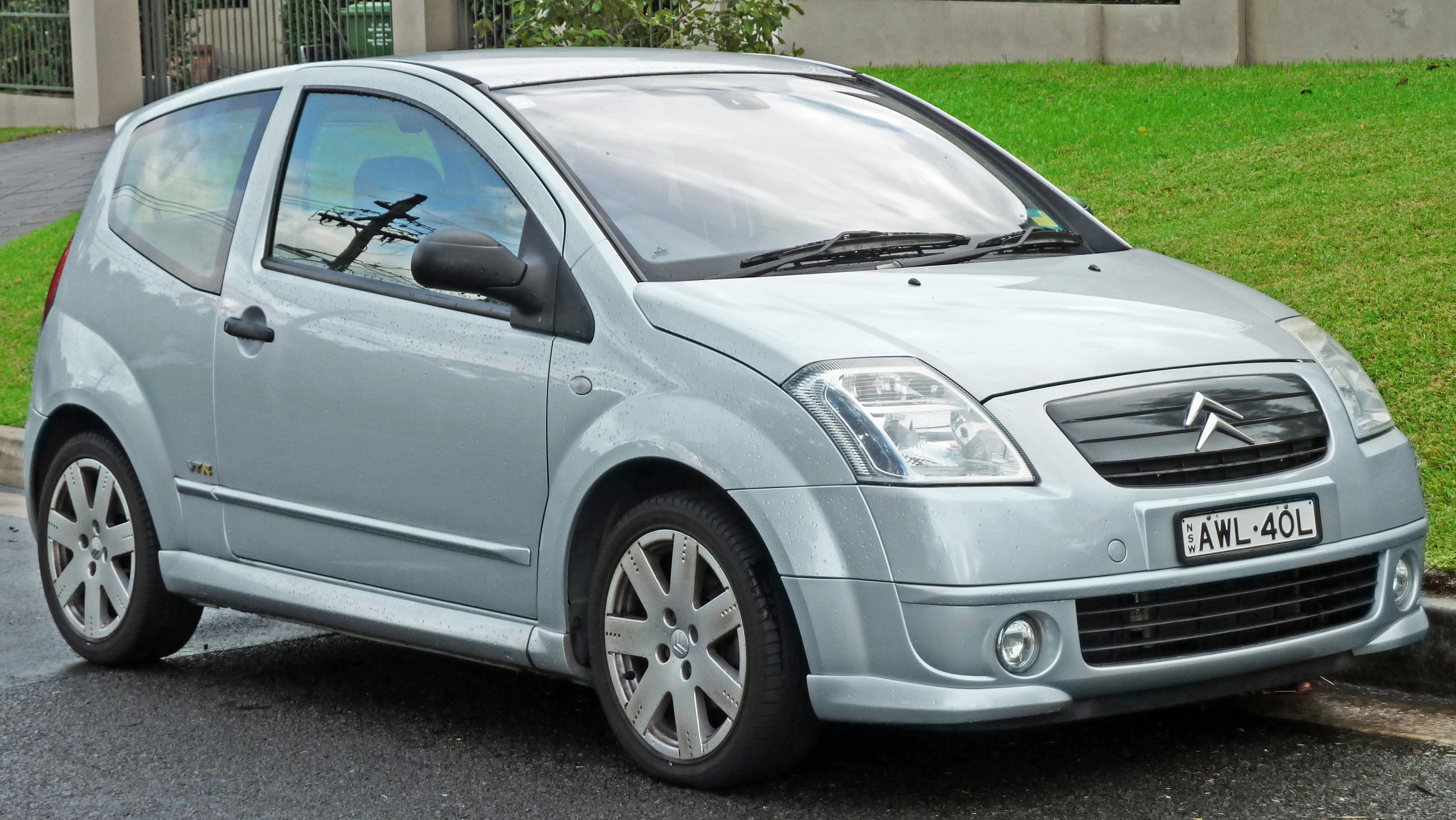
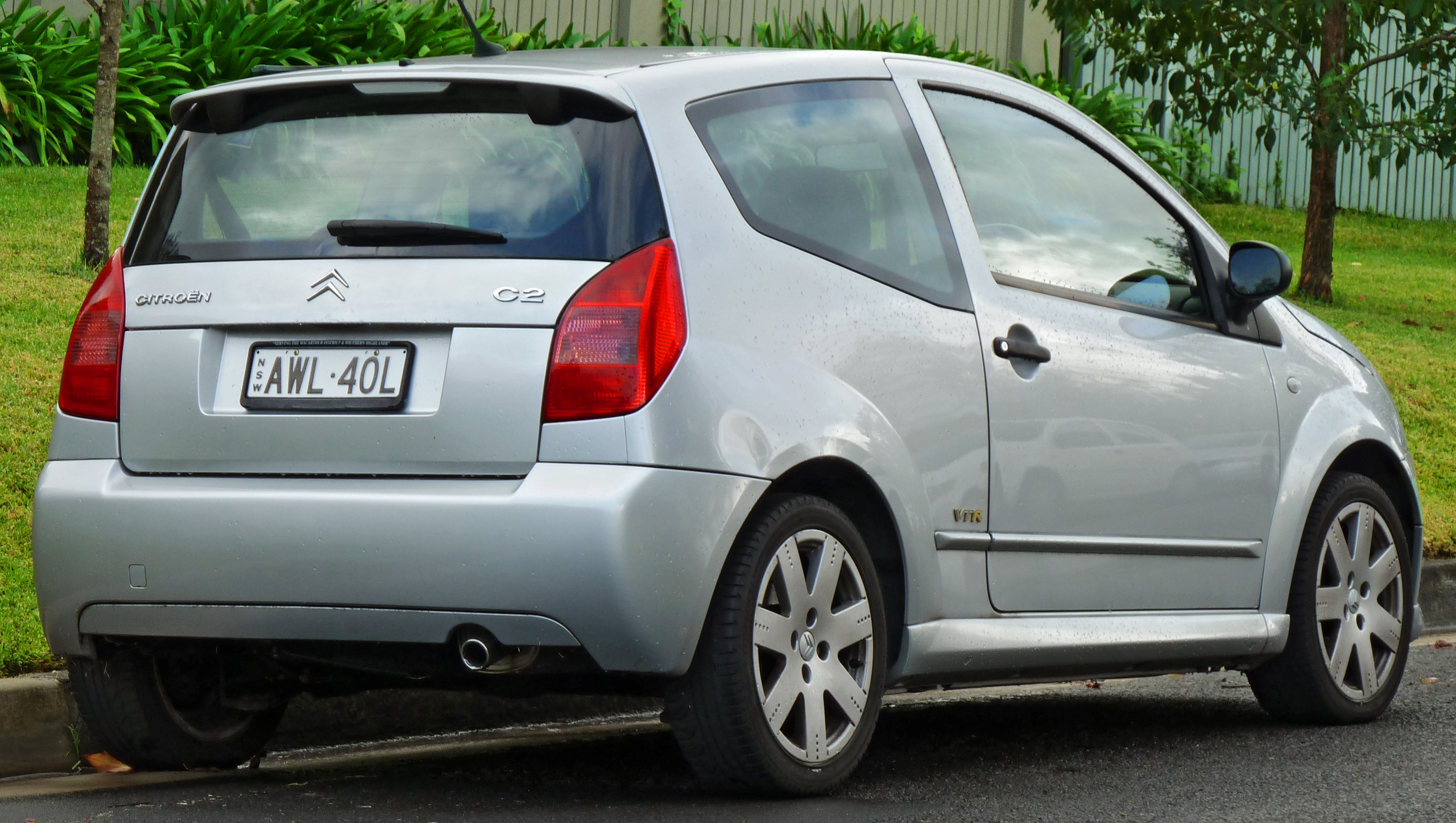
Pre-facelift Citroën C2 VTR (Australia)
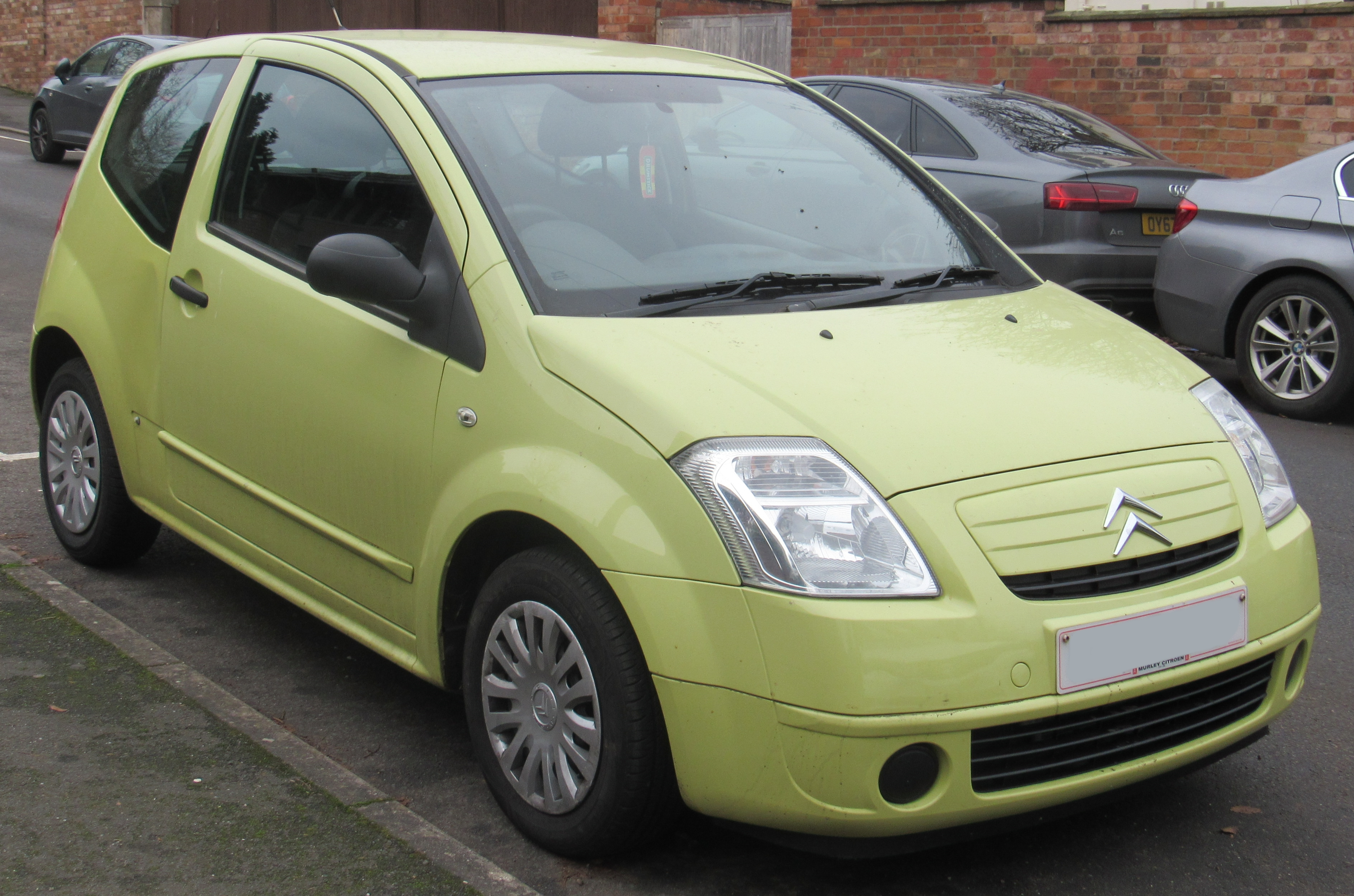
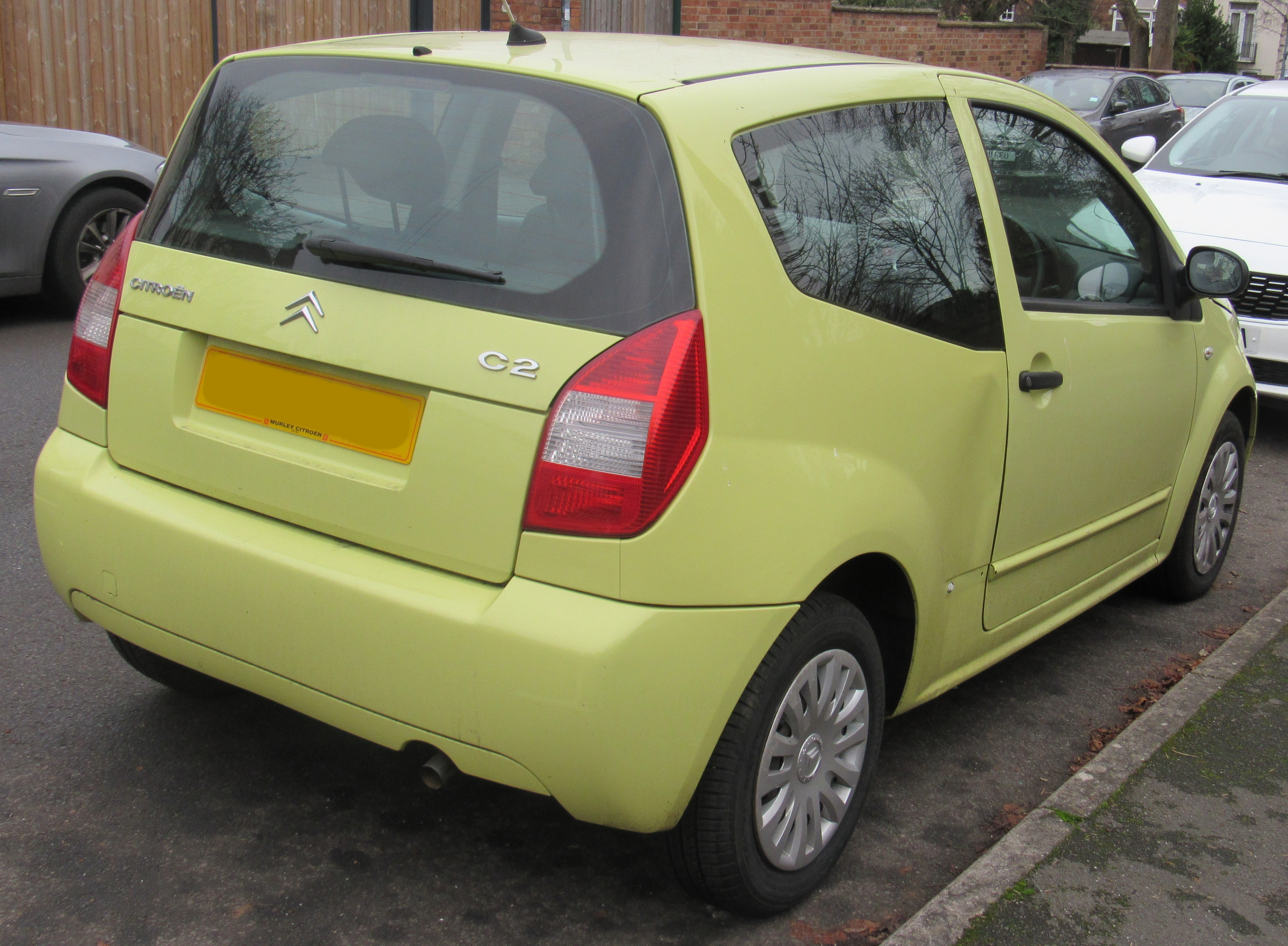
Facelift Citroën C2 Cool (United Kingdom)

The LX model was the "no-frills" version of the C2 and came with basic equipment, including black plastic bumpers and no fog lamps.

The L model, produced from 2003 to 2005, came with black lower bumper and door handles, CD player, rear-seat modulation, and no fog lamps. The Design included body coloured bumpers and electric windows.

The SX was the luxury spec. It featured 'bumper colour coded paint' and air conditioning, the latter of which increases the 1.1 SX's 0–100 km/h time by 4.5 seconds to 17.2 seconds.

The Furio, VTR and VTS are continuations of the sports models which made the C2's predecessor, the Saxo, famous as an affordable "pocket rocket". The Furio has the same sports body kit as the more expensive VTR and VTS models but lacks their alloy wheels. Earlier models of the Furio had 15" Coyote alloys, but these were later replaced with wheel trims from the end of 2003 onwards.

The VTR also has a 103 PS (76 kW; 102 bhp) engine, whereas the VTS, the premium sports model, has a 118 PS (87 kW; 116 bhp) engine capable of accelerating from 0 to 100 km/h (62 mph) in 8.0 seconds. This was somewhat sluggish by contemporary hot hatch standards but was designed to be more insurance friendly.

Other additions that helped the VTS model achieve a low insurance rating (in the United Kingdom) were security-based including deadlocks and a Thatcham Category 1 alarm system which includes perimeter and volumetric detection as well as an engine immobiliser.

The limited-edition model GT, introduced in September 2004, offered a sporty body kit, with bright red, blue, silver and black paintwork and unique white alloy wheels. All GTs have a numbered certificate to show their authenticity. Only 2,500 were made, exclusive to the United Kingdom.

In 2006, there were a number of small revisions to the C2. Externally the car looks identical save minor changes to alloy wheels (on the VTR), half colour coded door mirrors, clear side indicator lenses, and white indicator rear lenses. Internal changes saw a new stereo with vehicle computer integration and some cosmetic changes to the driver displays and centre console.

The previous models ran two integrated electrical systems. The popular CAN BUS (Controller Area Network, by Bosch) and PSA's proprietary VAN BUS (Vehicle Area Network).

In 2006, PSA dumped the VAN BUS system for an all CAN-BUS system, giving it better functionality and compatibility with more component manufacturers. This required some of the electrical components to be replaced, explaining why the displays, radio/CD and some other electronic equipment were changed.

The VTR Sensodrive and VTS manual were the two petrol options available for the Australian C2.

=== Safety ===
ANCAP test results* Citroen C2 3 door hatch (2004)
Test	Score
Overall	4 /5 stars
Frontal offset	13.49/16
Side impact	14.43/16
Pole	Not Assessed
Seat belt reminders	1/3
Whiplash protection	Not Assessed
Pedestrian protection	Marginal
Electronic stability control	Not Assessed

Euro NCAP test results for a LHD, three door hatchback variant on a registration of 2003:

Test	Score	Points
Overall:	N/A	N/A
Adult occupant:	4/5 stars	29
Child occupant:	3/5 stars	29
Pedestrian:	2/4 stars	12
Safety assist:	N/A	N/A

=== Facelift ===
April 2007 saw Citroën Europe announcing a facelift for its C2 model, which had received a minor update in November 2006. The 2009 C2 featured a larger front bumper and restyled grille with a chrome surround. The trim specifications remain in line with the range of 2008. Levels remained unchanged.

== Technology ==
The Citroën C2 brings with it two key new technologies, the Stop & Start environmental system, and the SensoDrive five-speed automated manual.

- The Stop & Start is a hybrid system, with the internal combustion engine being supplemented by a small electric motor. The "Stop & Start" system automatically disengages the engine when you bring the vehicle to a complete stop, with pressure being applied to the brake pedal.

The engine quickly restarts when pressure on the brake pedal is relieved. The technology has been developed by Valeo and results in lower urban fuel consumption. The system, however, requires pressure on the brake pedal when stationary for the system to work, holding the vehicle on the handbrake (parking brake) alone will not be sufficient for the system to operate. The Stop & Start system is mounted to the SensoDrive gearbox.

A Stop & Start system was previously seen in the 1980s, with the Volkswagen Polo "Formel E" and the Volkswagen Golf MKIII "Ecomatic", although this was different in operation; in the Volkswagen system the engine stopped automatically when placed in neutral. Selecting a gear by moving the stick to the left (for first or reverse) activated the starter motor.

- The SensoDrive five-speed automated manual transmission is an electronically controlled manual gearbox, with the clutch and gear change functions electronically managed. As a result, the vehicle has no clutch pedal and the gear lever, which remains present, has no mechanical link with the gearbox. The SensoDrive gearbox is managed by a control unit, which controls two actuators.

One actuator changes gears while the other, which is equipped with a facing wear compensation system, opens and closes the clutch. The gearbox control unit also dialogues with the engine control unit. The SensoDrive gearbox has two shifting options of either the fully automated mode or the paddle-shifted manual mode.

== Engines available ==
- 1.1 L TU1 (1124 cc) I4, 60 PS (44 kW; 59 hp)
- 1.4 L TU3 (1360 cc) I4, 75 PS (55 kW; 74 hp)
- 1.4 L ET3 SensoDrive Stop & Start (1360 cc) I4, 90 PS (66 kW; 89 hp)
- 1.4 L DV4 HDi Diesel (1398 cc) I4, 68 PS (50 kW; 67 hp) and 111 lb⋅ft (150 N⋅m)
- 1.6 L TU5 SensoDrive VTR (1587 cc) I4], 110 PS (81 kW; 108 hp)
- 1.6 L TU5 VTS (1587cc) I4, 125 PS (92 kW; 123 hp)
- 1.6 L DV6 HDi Diesel (1560cc) I4, 110 PS (81 kW; 108 hp) and 198 lb⋅ft (268 N⋅m)

== Trim levels ==
=== United Kingdom trim levels ===
==== 2003–2008 ====
- L
- Airplay
- LX
- Design
- Cool
- SX
- Stop & Start
- Furio
- VTR
- VTS
- GT (Limited Edition 2004)
- Loeb (Limited Edition 2007)
- Code (Limited Edition 2007)

==== 2008–2009 ====
- Vibe 1.1i and 1.4HDi.
- Rhythm 1.1i, 1.4i and 1.4HDi.
- Cachet 1.1i and 1.4i.
- Stop & Start 1.4i 16v 90 bhp (67 kW; 91 PS) SensoDrive.
- VTR 1.4i, 1.6i 16v 110 bhp (82 kW; 112 PS) SensoDrive and 1.4HDi. All Now With Air Con.
- VTS 1.6i 16v 125 bhp (93 kW; 127 PS) and 1.6HDi 16v 110 bhp (82 kW; 112 PS).
- Code 1.6i 16v 125 bhp (93 kW; 127 PS).

== Chinese version (T21) ==
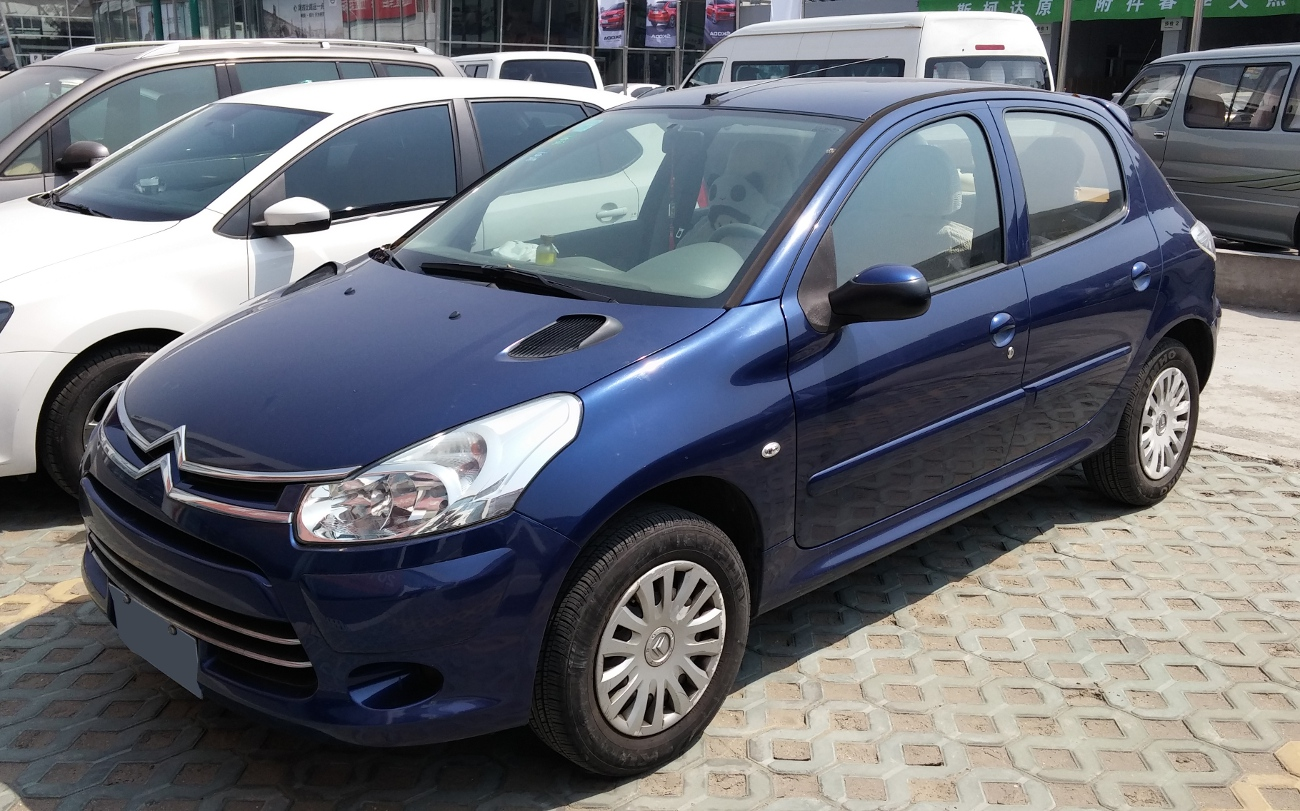
Citroën C2 in China

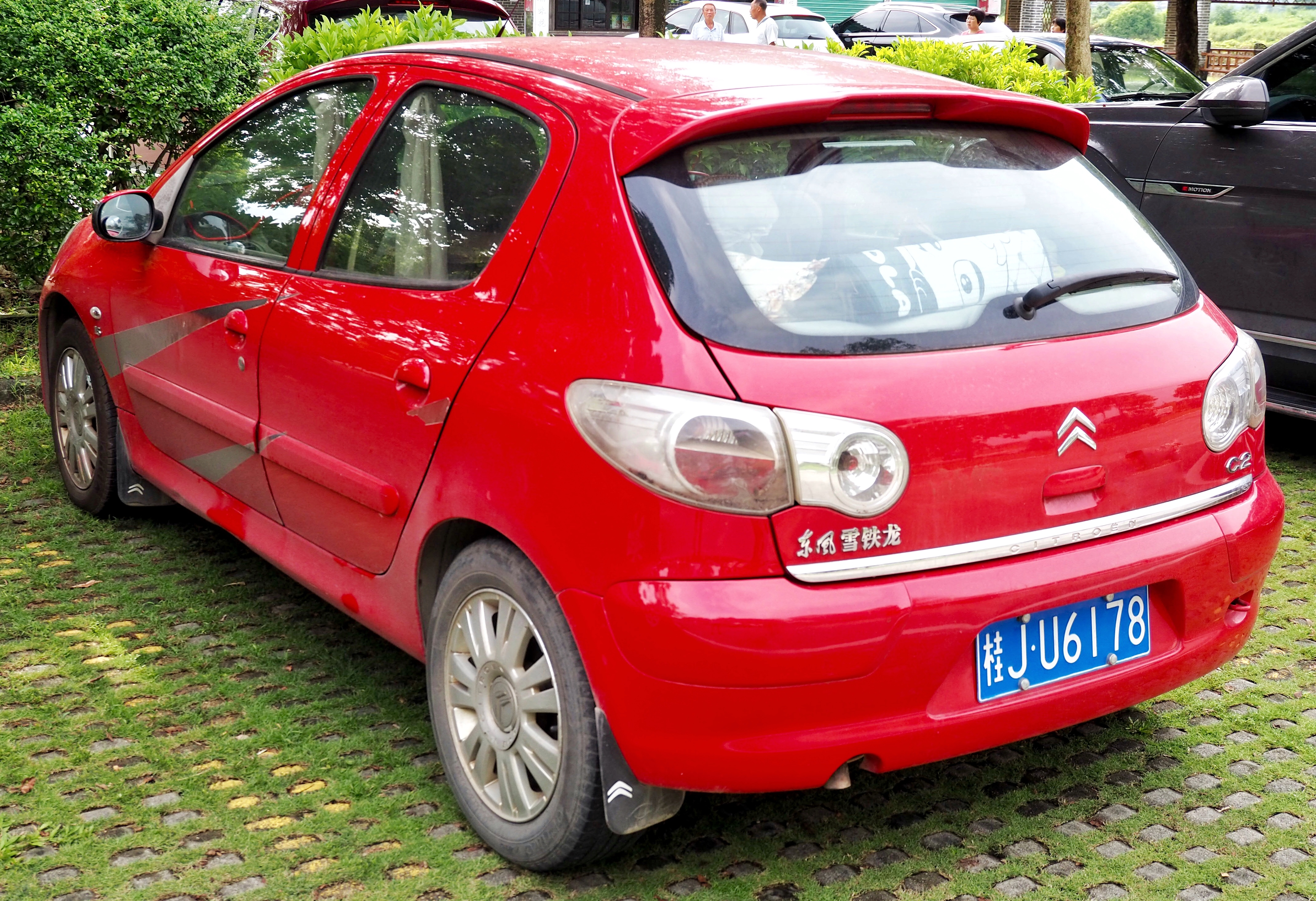
Citroën C2 in China (pre-facelift)

From October 2006 to 2013, the Peugeot 206 was sold by PSA, for the Chinese market only as the Citroën C2. With a modified front and rear body, this is similar to the way the Citroën LN was derived from the Peugeot 104.

The car has no common features with the C2 on other markets, due to the positioning of the model in the line up of Citroën China.

It has a length of 388 cm (153 in), width of 168 cm (66 in), height of 144 cm (57 in), with a wheelbase of 244 cm (96 in), and is powered by one of the two engine options: a 1.4 L (76 hp or 57 kW) and a 1.6 L (106 hp or 79 kW). Weight ranges from 1,040 kg (2,290 lb) to 1,100 kg (2,400 lb).

Late 2012, Citroën released a crossover-styled variant, called C2 Cross.

It was produced in China at the Wuhan Dongfeng Peugeot-Citroën Automobile site until 2013.

== Sales and production ==
Year	Worldwide Production	Worldwide sales	Notes
2009	49,100	52,400	
2010	8,200	9,300	
2011	10,403	10,468	Total production reaches 676,004 units.
2012	14,800	14,600	Total production reaches 690,800 units.
2013	9,800	10,000	Total production reaches 700,600 units.

These figures are including the Chinese C2, which is not a proper C2 but rather a slightly redesigned Peugeot 206. Almost 80,000 of these Chinese Citroën C2 were produced.
