= Country club (disambiguation) =

Country club is a private club that offers a variety of recreational sports facilities.

Country club may also refer to:

== Geography ==
=== United States ===
- Country Club, Bronx, New York, a neighborhood in New York City
- Country Club, California, a census-designated place in San Joaquin County
- Country Club, Denver, Colorado, a neighborhood of Denver
- Country Club, Florida, a census-designated place
- Country Club, Missouri, a city besides St. Joseph
- Country Club District, Missouri, a group of neighborhoods in Kansas City
- Country Club, San Juan, Puerto Rico
- Country Club Historic District (disambiguation), various NRHP-listed places

== Arts, entertainment, and media ==
=== Literature ===
- The Country Club (play), Off-Broadway play

=== Music ===
- Country Club (album), an album by Travis Tritt
  - "Country Club" (song), a 1989 song by Travis Tritt
- "Country Club", a 1909 ragtime two-step composition by Scott Joplin

=== Television ===
- "Country Club", an episode of the American sitcom Mama's Family
- Country Club, working title for the Disney animated television series Big City Greens
- Country Club (TV series), a 1958 Canadian variety show

== Brands and enterprises ==
- Country Club, a malt liquor first produced in the early 1950s by the M.K. Goetz Brewing Company
- Country Club Plaza, a shopping district in the American city of Kansas City

== Sports venues ==
- Country Club, Harare, a cricket ground based in Harare, formerly known as the Interfin High Performance Academy
- Reseda Country Club, a former sports and entertainment venue in Reseda, California
- The Country Club, in Brookline, Massachusetts; a major golf course
- The Country Club Johannesburg, a 36-hole golf complex in Johannesburg, Gauteng, South Africa
- The Country Club (Philippines), golf course in Santa Rosa, Laguna.

== Other uses ==
- Country club Republican, a label given to upper-class, moderate Republican Party members
