= Citroën LNA =

Citroën LN (1976–1978) Citroën LNA (1978–1986)
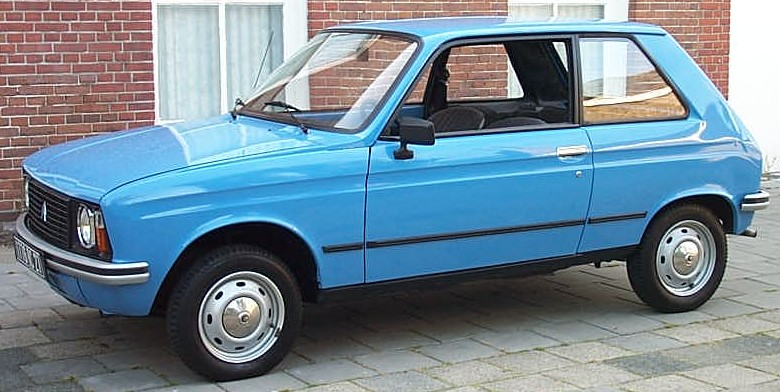
- 1977 Citroën LN

Overview
- Manufacturer: Citroën
- Production: 1976–1986
- Assembly: France: Aulnay-sous-Bois; Spain: Villaverde, Madrid; Belgium: Forest, Brussels

Body and chassis
- Class: City car (A)
- Body style: 3-door hatchback
- Layout: FF layout
- Related: Peugeot 104; Talbot Samba

Powertrain
- Engine: 602 cc R06/630 flat-2; 652 cc V06/6xx flat-2; 954 cc 108C I4; 1124 cc 109/5F I4
- Transmission: 4-speed manual

Dimensions
- Wheelbase: 2,230 mm (87.8 in)
- Length: 3,380 mm (133.1 in)
- Width: 1,520 mm (59.8 in)
- Height: 1,370 mm (53.9 in)
- Curb weight: 700 kg (1,543 lb) approx (60%:40%)

Chronology
- Predecessor: Citroën Dyane
- Successor: Citroën AX

The Citroën LN (Hélène) and Citroën LNA (Hélèna) are front-engine, front-drive, three-door, four passenger hatchback city cars manufactured and marketed by Citroën from 1976 to 1986 over a single generation — as a badge engineered variant of the Peugeot 104, introduced shortly after the takeover of Citroën by Peugeot.

The added "A" used in the name of the bigger engined LNA stood for Athlétique (Athletic). Its noise figure is 69 decibels.

== Citroën LN (1976–1978) ==
The LN was introduced in July 1976. It combined the bodyshell of the Peugeot 104 Z (a shortened floorpan version of the 104) with the economical 602 cc two-cylinder gasoline engine of the Citroën 2CV. Equipment levels were low, but the LN's key selling points were its low price and running costs.

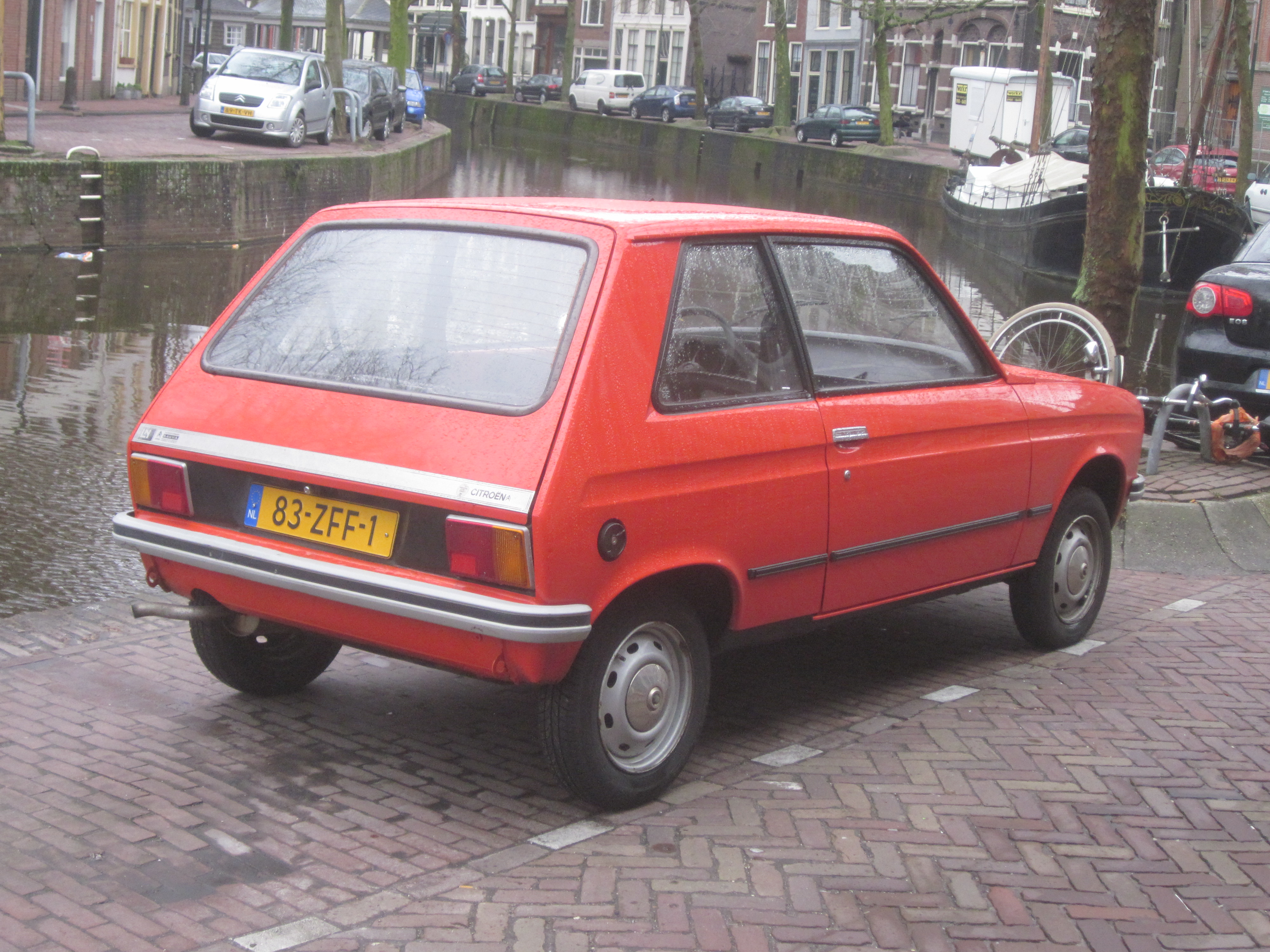
Citroën LN (rear view)

Strongly resembling the Peugeot it was based on, the LN was assembled at a Citroën plant and fitted with a Citroën engine. Peugeot had recently acquired Citroën and the LN stood in stark contrast to assurances that the two marques would retain their individuality. When pressed, Citroën explained that the LN project had been rushed through because of "the need to supply customers and the [dealership] network with a model to strengthen Citroën's position at the lower end of the market," hardly a ringing endorsement. The Citroën range included the Ami and the Dyane as well as the venerable 2CV which would continue in production well after the others. Citroën made it clear that this would not happen again, which remained largely true until the Citroën Saxo, which was a badge engineered variant of the Peugeot 106 (itself developed from the Citroen AX platform).

== Citroën LNA (1978–1986) ==
Citroën marketed the LN mainly in Southern Europe and neighbouring countries, and a more powerful replacement, the LNA, was introduced on 6 November 1978 and was exported to much of the rest of Europe (including right-hand drive versions for Great Britain, where it was not launched until early 1983). It had the more powerful and modern 652 cc two-cylinder engine of the Citroën Visa with electronic ignition. In December 1982 a 1.1 L four-cylinder engine was added which had a top speed of nearly 90 mph (145 km/h) for the LNA 11E and 11RE, which spelled the end of the two-cylinder models in many markets. But like the smaller-engined LN, the LNA was cheap to buy and cheap to run. For Italy and France only, there was also an intermediate version called the LNA 10E, with a 954 cc Peugeot engine.

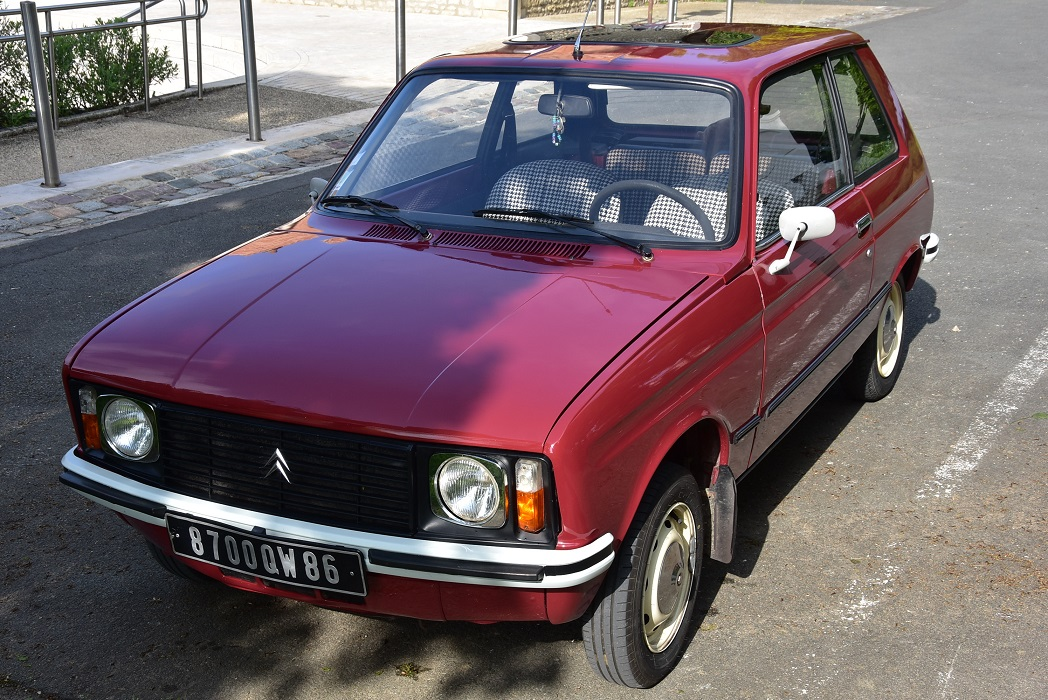
'81 in red delivery

By 1980 a variant of the LNA could was marketed in France as the "LNA Entreprise", with the back seat removed. This was effectively a function of taxation rules, whereby the two-seater car could be sold with a reduced rate of value-added tax.

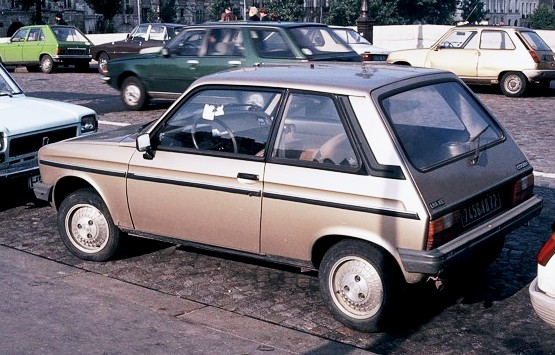
1983 facelift LNA, rear 3/4 view

After the LNA's launch, it spawned another badge engineered variant, the Talbot Samba, featuring square headlights and a different, slightly longer, rear body section. The mechanicals and a developed version of the full length 104 floorpan were used in the Citroën Visa that was also launched in 1978. 1983 cars arrived early, in July 1982, and benefited from new molded black plastic bumpers, a new decoration for the C-pillar, a newly positioned rubber side-strip, new larger rear lights on a black-painted rear panel, blacked out chrome window trim, and more elaborately styled wheels which were shared with the manufacturer's Visa Super E. The interior was also improved (with a parcel shelf, for instance) and the folding rear seat was now split. In July 1985 Citroën introduced cars for the 1986 model year. The previously black grille and bumpers were now coloured grey, although LNA production ceased in the summer of 1986, around the same time as the Talbot Samba. Its successor, the Citroën AX, was launched shortly afterwards.

It was not launched onto the British market until early 1983, where the most popular entry-level small cars were the Austin Metro and Ford Fiesta. It also reached the UK market during the same year as the Fiat Uno, Nissan Micra, Peugeot 205 and Vauxhall Nova, but failed to prove anywhere near as popular as any of these cars and was withdrawn from sale there after just two years.

The Peugeot 104 remained in production until 1988 even though its popular successor, the 205, had been launched five years earlier, as an entry-level model in some markets. The Visa also lasted until 1988. The Visa-based box van Citroën C15 version was the longest lasting 104 derivative, using 205 and 206 mechanicals it was made until 2005.

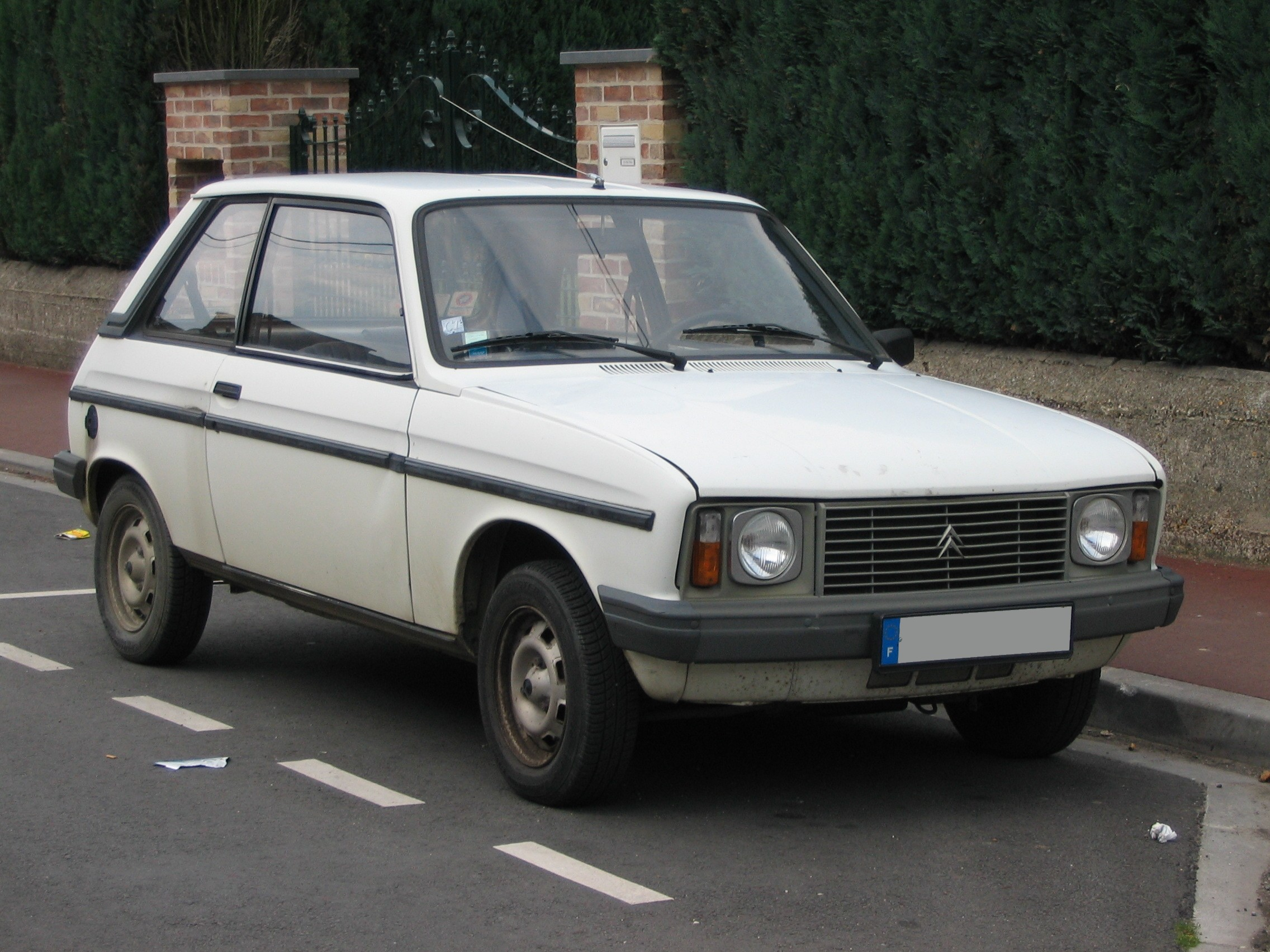
1986 Citroën LNA

== Technical specifications ==
Engine specification
Type	V 06 / 630	R 06 / 630	V 06 / 644
Bore	77 mm (3.0 in)	74 mm (2.9 in)	77 mm (3.0 in)
Stroke	70 mm (2.8 in)	70 mm (2.8 in)	70 mm (2.8 in)
displacement	652 cc	602 cc	652 cc
Volumetric ration	9 / 1	9.5 / 1	9.5 / 1
Working compression	11 bars	11 bars	11 bars
Max power	36 PS (26 kW; 36 hp) at 5,500 rpm	32 PS (24 kW; 32 hp) at 5,750 rpm	34.5 PS (25 kW; 34 hp) at 5,500 rpm
Max torque	5.3 kg⋅m (52 N⋅m; 38 lb⋅ft) at 3,500 rpm	4.2 kg⋅m (41 N⋅m; 30 lb⋅ft) at 3,500 rpm	
	5.1 daN.m		4.8 daN.m at 3,500 rpm
Max rpm	5,850 rpm		6,000 rpm
Camshaft values	for 1 mm rising		
R.O.A	7° after TDC	0°5' after TDC	
R.F.A	42° after BDC	49°15 after TDC	
A.O.E	35° before BDC	35°55 after TDC	
A.F.E / R.F.E	6° before TDC	3°30 after TDC	
Transmissions
1st gear	11/50		11/50
2nd gear	18/45		18/45
3rd gear	28/46		28/46
4th gear	34/39		34/39
reverse gear	11/46		11/46
transmission ratio	8/33	8/35	9/35
