= The Club =

The Club may refer to:

== Books ==
- The Club (Damrosch book), a 2019 book by Leo Damrosch about the London dining club
- The Club (Dasal Book), a 2025 book by Jennifer Dasal about the American Girls' Club in Paris

== Film ==
- The Club (1980 film), a satirical film adapted from a play by David Williamson
- The Club (1981 film), by Kirk Wong
- The Club (1994 film), a Canadian slasher film
- The Club (2015 film), a Chilean drama film

== Music and radio ==
- The Club (radio show); see Rage (TV program)
- "The Club" (song), by The Grace from the album Graceful 4
- Perfecto Presents: The Club, an album by Paul Oakenfold
- "The Club", a song in In The Heights

== Television ==
- The Club (Australian TV series), a 2002 Australian reality television series
- The Club (British TV series), a 2003 British reality television series
- The Club (2004 TV series), a 2004–2005 American reality television series that aired on SpikeTV
- The Club (2010 TV series), a 2010 American reality television series about the Chicago White Sox that aired on MLB Network
- The Club (Mexican TV series), a 2019 Mexican drama web television series
- The Club (Turkish TV series), a 2021 Turkish period drama series
- The Club, the original title of the unaired American television series, Members Only

=== Episodes ===
- "The Club" (Frasier), 1995
- "The Club" (The Amazing World of Gumball), 2011
- "The Club" (Atlanta), 2016

== Video games ==
- The Club (video game), a third-person shooter game
- The Club (Nickelodeon), an online role-playing game

== Other uses ==
- The Club (automotive), a steering wheel locking device
- The Club (dining club), a London group of notables founded in 1764
- The Club (fine arts), a NYC-based membership group founded in 1949
- The Club (play), a 1977 play by David Williamson
- The O.C. (professional wrestling), a professional wrestling stable formerly named The Club
- The Club (Trotskyist), a British political group
- The Club, a podcast by The Fellas Studios, hosted by Rory Jennings, Adam McKola & Buvey

== See also ==
- Club (disambiguation)
