= Citroën Saxo =

1996–2003 French supermini car

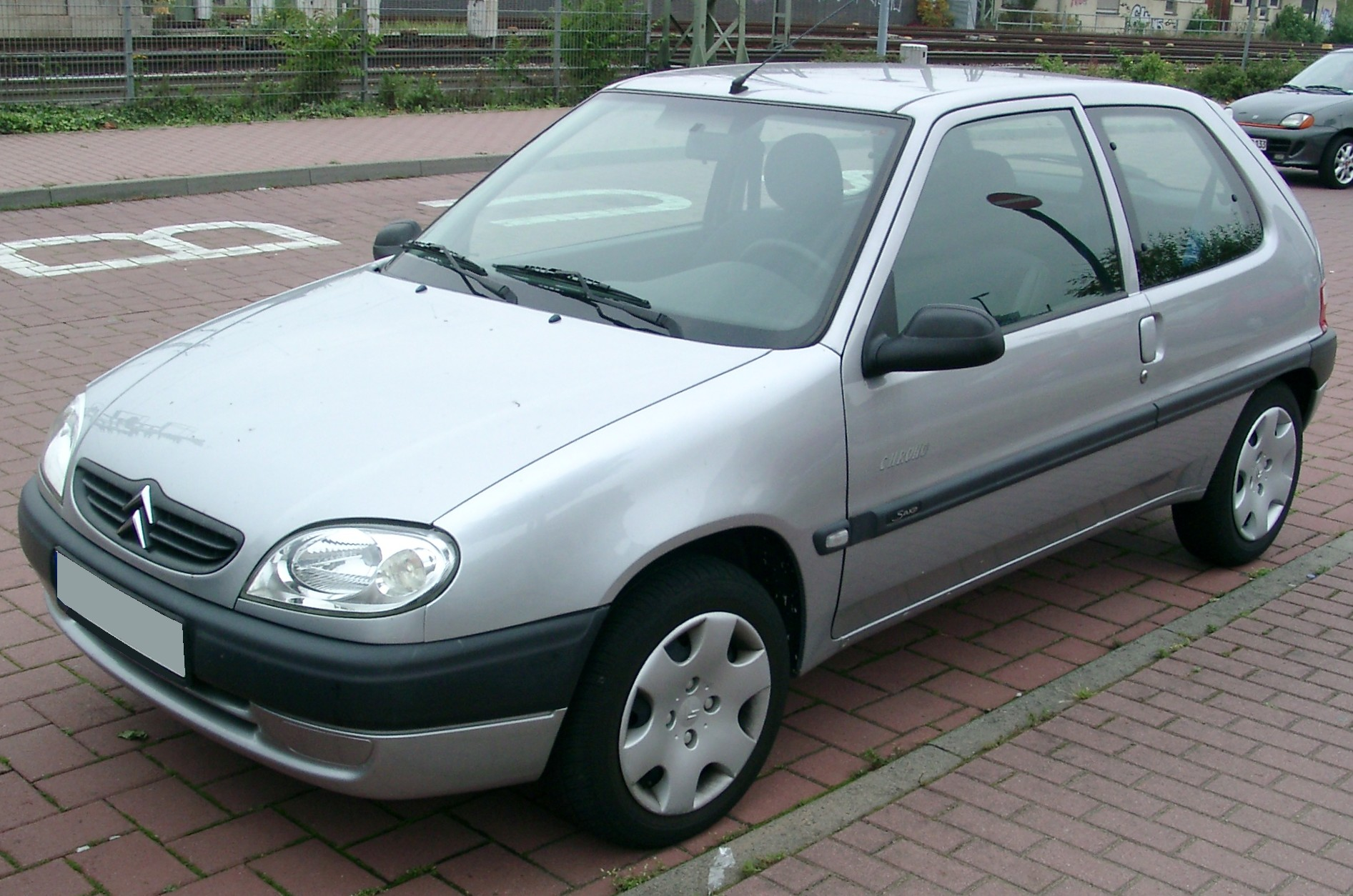

Overview
- Manufacturer: Citroën
- Also called: Citroën Chanson (Japan, 1997–1999)
- Production: 1996–2003
- Assembly: France: Aulnay-sous-Bois (PSA Aulnay-sous-Bois Plant); Portugal: Mangualde (Mangualde Plant)
- Designer: Donato Coco

Body and chassis
- Class: Subcompact Car (B)
- Body style: 3/5-door hatchback
- Layout: Front-engine, front-wheel-drive
- Related: Peugeot 106; Citroën AX

Powertrain
- Engine: Petrol: 954 cc TU9 I4; 1124 cc TU1 I4; 1360 cc TU3 I4; 1587 cc TU5 I4; Diesel: 1527 cc TUD5 I4
- Electric motor: Brushed DC Electric motor
- Transmission: 5-speed manual 3-speed automatic

Dimensions
- Wheelbase: 2,385 mm (93.9 in)
- Length: 3,718 mm (146.4 in); 3,737 mm (147.1 in) (VTS)
- Width: 1,595 mm (62.8 in); 1,620 mm (63.8 in) (VTS)
- Height: 1,379 mm (54.3 in)
- Kerb weight: 805–935 kg (1,775–2,061 lb)

Chronology
- Predecessor: Citroën AX
- Successor: Citroën C2 (three-door); Citroën C3 (five-door)

The Citroën Saxo is a supermini car which was produced by the French manufacturer Citroën from 1996 to 2003. It was sold in Japan as the Citroën Chanson, because Honda had registered the "Saxo" name. The Saxo was a development of the Citroën AX and Peugeot 106, which shared a platform and running gear (the major difference being interiors and body panels). It was discontinued in 2003, when it was replaced with the Citroën C2 and Citroën C3 which launched a year earlier. Both models were developed alongside the Peugeot 206.

== Overview ==
=== Engines and performance ===
All engines were from the PSA TU engine series that powered the Peugeot 205 from 1988 and the Citroën AX, and had their roots before that with the OHC PSA X engine various other PSA cars used such as the Citroën Visa and the predecessors of the Peugeot 206 (Peugeot 104 and Peugeot 205). The range included five petrol engines and one diesel engine, all naturally aspirated.

Although the quoted power outputs are low in comparison to modern small hatchbacks, or even to other hatchbacks of the time, the kerb weight was generally very low, with even the range-topping VTS having a kerb weight of just 935 kg (2,061 lb), with other smaller engine models (except the diesel) being around 100 kg lighter than this.

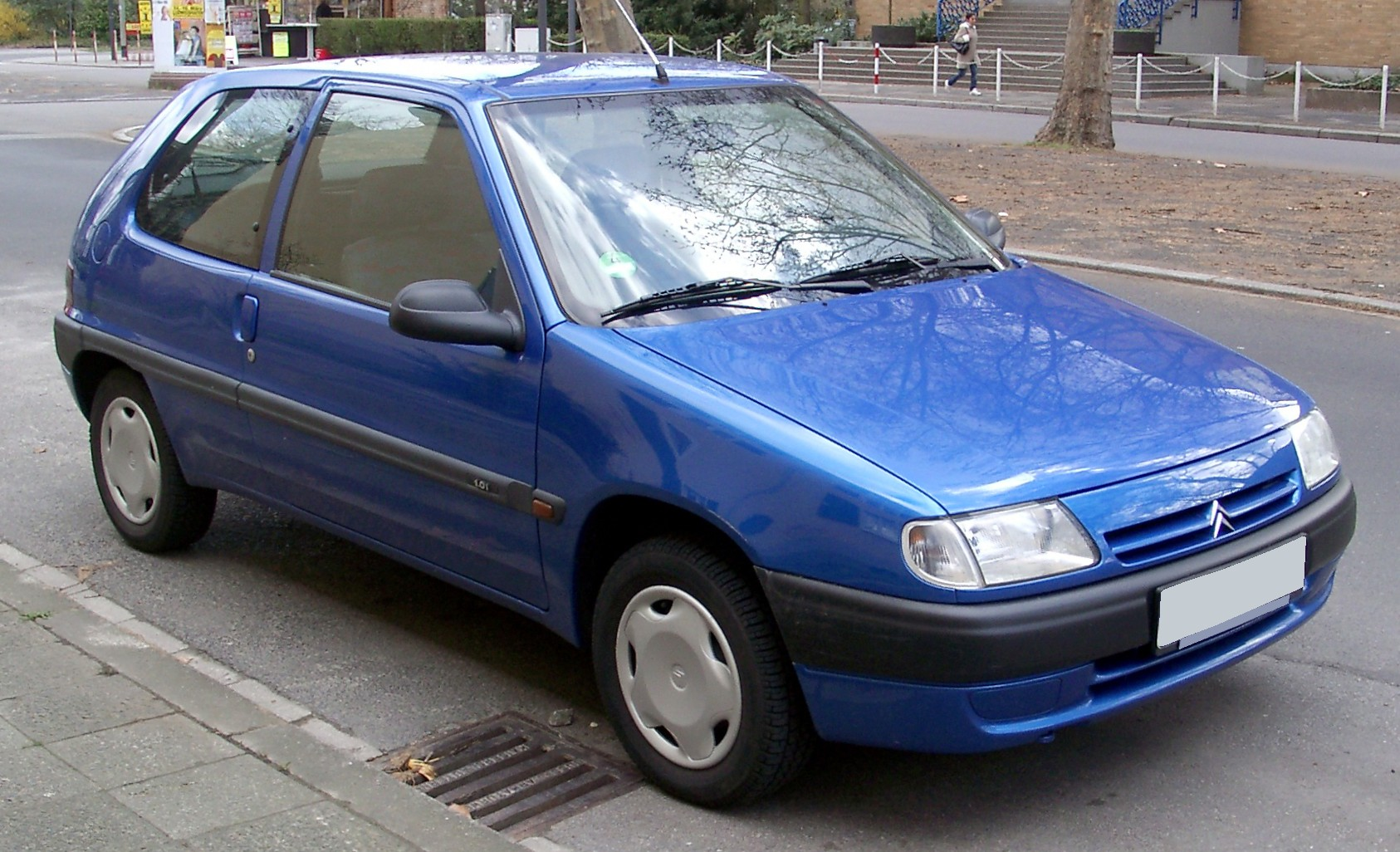
Pre-facelift Saxo 1.0 3-door

This meant a high power to weight ratio resulting in decent acceleration and made the car suitable for city driving. Aside from the VTS which had 16 valves, all engines were the older SOHC units which meant relatively low city MPG figures. Even the popular 1.1i engine would struggle to achieve more than 35 to 40mpg in town when driven carefully.

The real world consumption between the smaller engines and the nippy 1.4i Westcoast/Furio variant was hardly noticeable, however the insurance premiums were. The early 1.0i was quite under powered, with the 1.1i being considered much better, since it was nearly 200cc larger and had roughly 30% more torque.

There were three sport models of the Saxo:

- The Westcoast, later replaced by the Furio which featured a 1.4I 8V 55 kW (75 hp) engine with a top speed of 175 km/h (109 mph), and a 0-62.5 mph (0–100 km/h) time of 11.2 seconds.
- The VTR MK1 (1997–1999) featured a fuel injected, 1.6-liter 8-valve 66 kW (90 hp) engine with a top speed of 187 km/h (116 mph) and a 0-62.5 mph (0–100 km/h) time of 10.0 seconds. The VTR MK2 (1999–2003) featured a 1.6I 8V 72 kW (98 hp) engine with a top speed of 193 km/h (120 mph) and a 0-62.5 mph (0–100 km/h) time of 9.4 seconds.
- The VTS 16V featured a 1.6I 88 kW (120 hp) engine with a top speed of 205 km/h (127 mph), and a 0 to 60 mph time of 7.8 seconds. The VTS MK1 (1997–1999) and MK2 (1999–2003) shared similar performance, although the MK2 was slightly slower due to it being marginally heavier.

These models included 247 mm (9.7 in) vented front brake discs, with the VTR and VTS also having rear brake discs (solid 247 mm (9.7 in) discs). Also, a different style of control arms and struts was used for the suspension. The VTS had a 22 mm (0.9 in) master brake cylinder, and the VTR and Westcoast/Furio had a 19 mm (0.7 in).

The VTS had a 19 mm (0.7 in) front anti roll bar and 22 mm (0.9 in) rear anti roll bar, while the VTR and Westcoast/Furio had a 19 mm (0.7 in) front and 21 mm (0.8 in) or sometimes 19 mm (0.7 in) rear antiroll bar. In addition, all the sports models featured a unique bodykit to the other models, commonly known as the "VT" bodykit.

In 1997, the Saxo's three speed automatic gearbox was combined with the 1.6i 8V 66 kW (90 hp) engine which was available on the Saxo SX and VSX. Then, in the end of 1997, the 1.6i automatic was replaced with a 1.4i 55 kW (75 hp) engine. The 1.6i was more powerful with a top speed of 176 km/h (109MPH) compared with the 1.4's top speed of 103 mph (166 km/h).

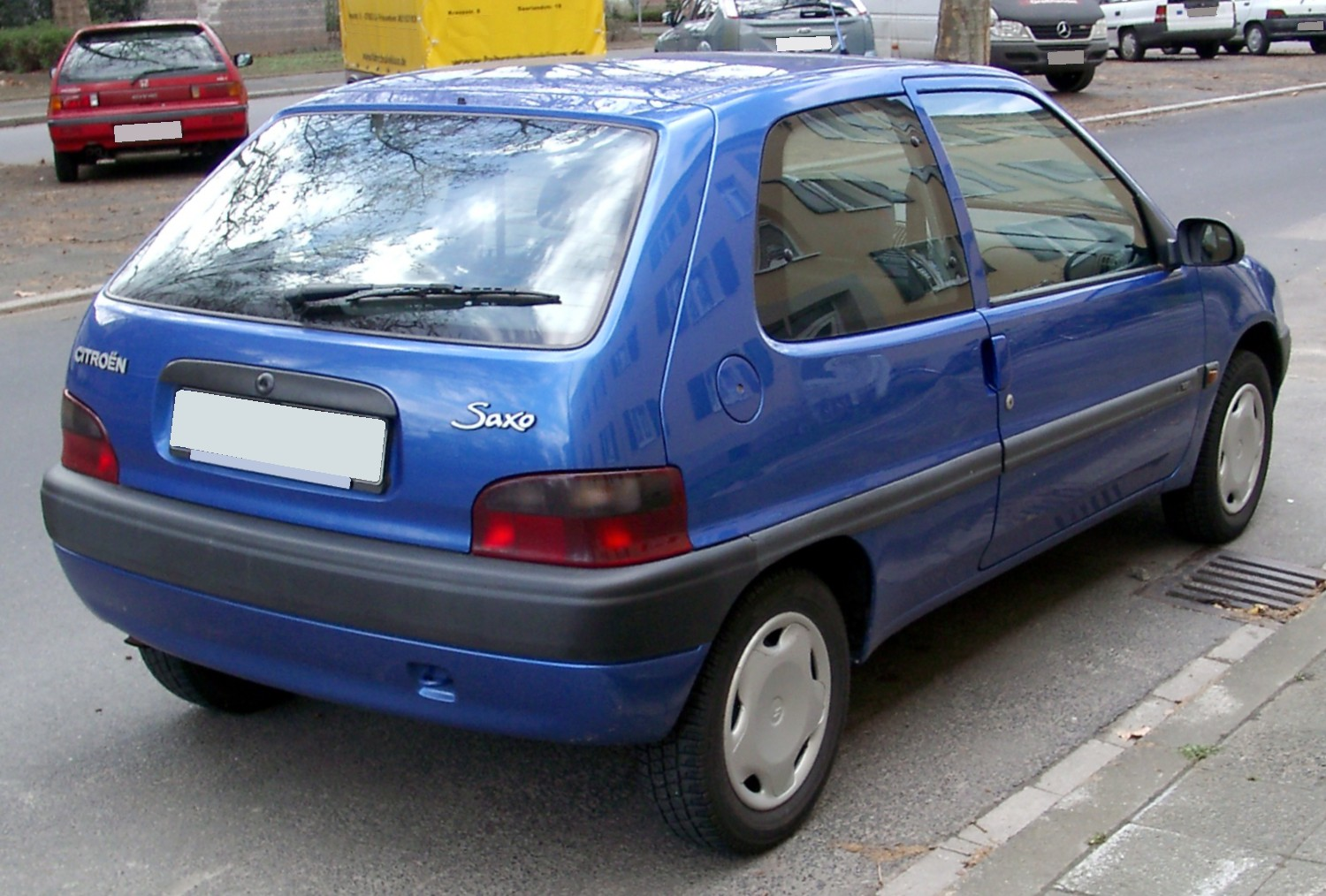
Rear view (pre-facelift)

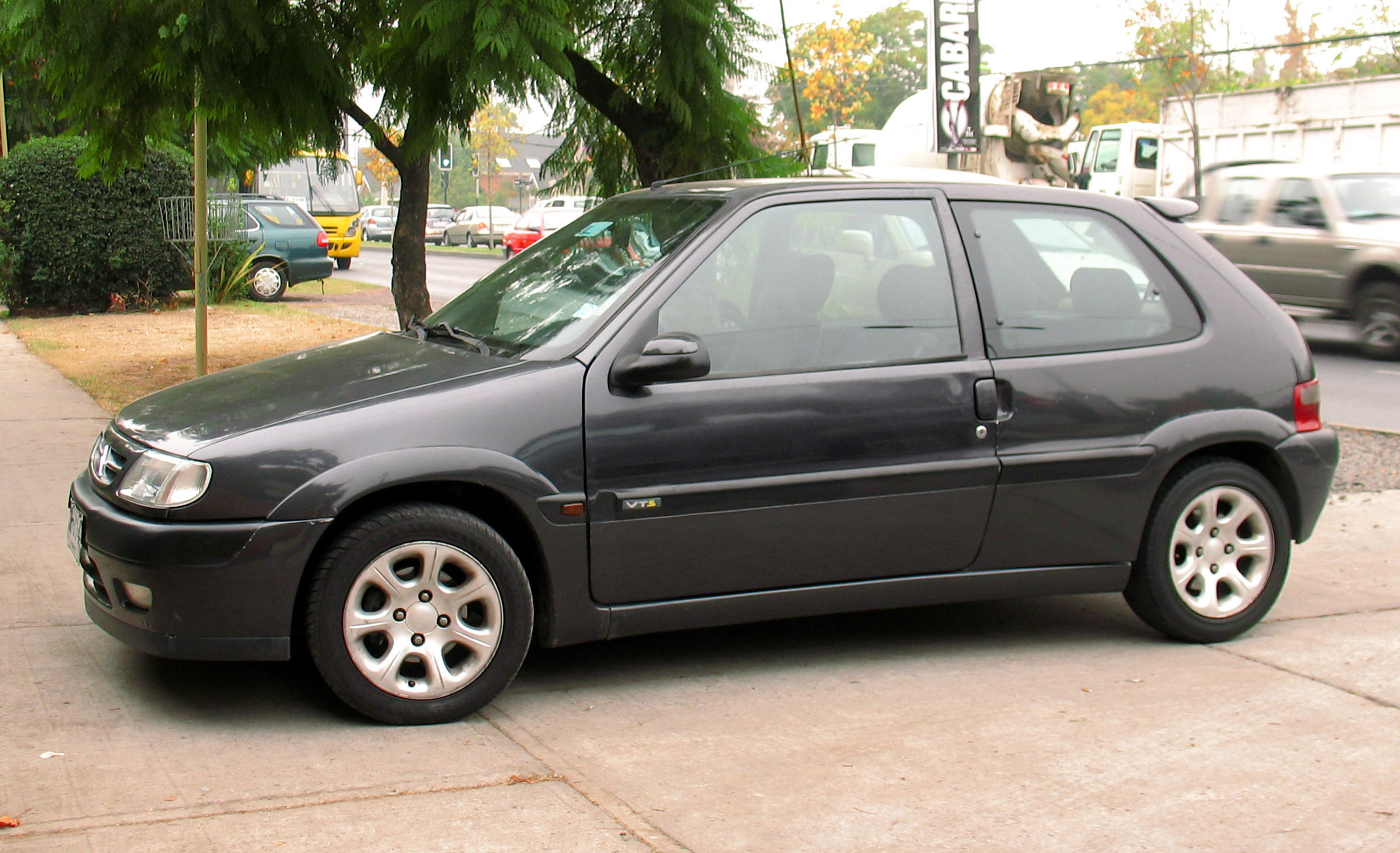
1998 Citroën Saxo VTS (pre-facelift)

Citroën carried on using the 1.4i engine on the facelift Saxo Automatic in 1999. Due to the C3 having a 1.4i automatic gearbox, the Saxo Automatic came to an end in March 2002, whilst the manual models were still sold right up to the end of 2003. An electric version of the Saxo with the engine swapped for an electric motor was also sold as the Saxo électrique.

- 1.0 L (954 cc) TU9 I4, 37 kW (50 hp) and 73 N⋅m (54 lb⋅ft)
- 1.1 L (1124 cc) TU1 I4, 44 kW (60 hp) and 89 N⋅m (66 lb⋅ft)
- 1.4 L (1360 cc) TU3 I4, 55 kW (75 hp) and 121 N⋅m (89 lb⋅ft)
- 1.5 L (1527 cc) TUD5 diesel I4, 43 kW (58 hp) and 117 N⋅m (86 lb⋅ft)
- 1.6 L (1587 cc) TU5 I4, 66 kW (90 hp) and 135 N⋅m (100 lb⋅ft)
- 1.6 L (1587 cc) TU5 I4, 72 kW (98 hp) and 135 N⋅m (100 lb⋅ft) (later VTR models)
- 1.6 L (1587 cc) TU5 I4, 88 kW (120 hp) and 145 N⋅m (107 lb⋅ft)
- 20 kW (26 hp) (peak power) separately excited brushed DC motor made by Leroy Somer

=== Saxo Electrique ===
The Saxo Electrique was the next evolution for Citroën to make electric vehicles (EV) after they were successful in making a few 100 Citroën AX Electriques. Still continuing the partnership with Heuliez, they produced the Saxo in much larger numbers, with 2,174 units were produced. As such, the Saxo is very similar to the AX in many ways, with the same battery and traction motor being used to power both.

The motor is a 20 kW (26 hp) separately excited brushed DC motor made by Leroy Somer, but was only capable of this peak power figure for short periods of time, and had a nominal power output of only 11 kW (15 hp). The range was estimated by Citroën to be around 80 km (50 mi) with a top speed of 91 km/h (56 mph). The car also came with a diesel heater to help with range in the winter. There are 20, 6V, 100Ah SAFT STM5 batteries in the car, and are liquid cooled, helping aid in fast charging of the vehicle, even compared to modern standards. The car uses an Avcon style charging plug.

=== Saxo Dynavolt ===
A prototype series hybrid was developed based on the Saxo Electrique and shown off at the 1998 Paris Auto Show, sharing technology with the Citroën Xsara Dynalto. It included a prototype 200cc 2 stroke flat twin direct injected gas engine as a range extender, connected to an electric motor at the flywheel that acts as an integrated starter alternator (ISG) to generate power for the batteries and start the engine when it's needed. The engine and ISG were so compact that it could fit under the rear seat. The engine was only used to power the batteries and electric motor in the front of the vehicle, taken from the Saxo Electrique. It had an estimated electric only range of 80 km (50 mi) and an extended range of 340 km (210 mi). It could go a max speed of 120 km/h (75 mph) and weighed 1,050 kg (2,310 lb). A subsequent development resulted in the Citroën Berlingo Dynavolt in March of 1999 at the Geneva Motor Show which used a larger four stroke 500cc twin engine.

=== Interior and equipment ===
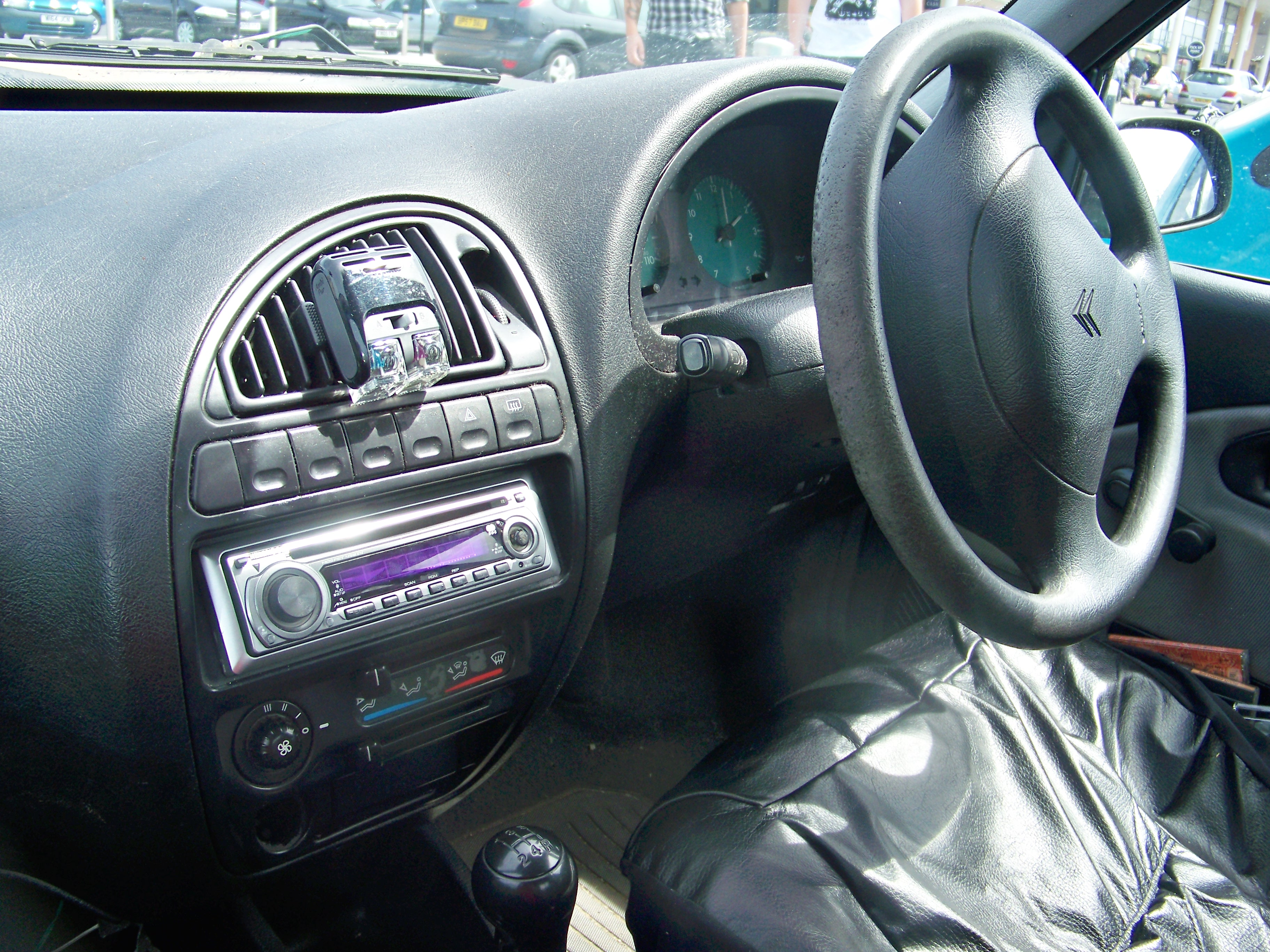
Interior

The equipment list was generally sparse, with budget models having drivers airbag, seat belt pre tensioners, cassette player, heated rear screen and tinted windows, and early Mark Ones with keypad immobilisers and a clock in place of a tachometer and three stud wheels, much like the AX. Further up the list sunroofs, PAS, Electric windows, ultrasonic alarm, passenger airbag, CD player, tachometer, front fog lights, bodykits, colour coded mirror caps and alloy wheels were added, to name a few.

Although MK2 Saxos were generally better equipped than their older counterparts, the interiors were still dated in comparison to other small hatchbacks of the time, such as the Vauxhall Corsa, with many of the center console controls originating from the older model of the Citroën AX.

The 1.6L VTR and VTS Saxos were the best equipped, with both gaining rear disc brakes as opposed to drum brakes, and ABS as standard for the VTS and an optional extra on all other 1.6-liter models.

Few special models were released throughout the Saxo's life, most notably the "Open Scandal", a Saxo with a full-length sliding canvas roof. Other special editions added certain extras to the lower end model, such as sunroofs or PAS. Notable models are the Westcoast up to 1999 and the Furio to 2003, as they incorporated the standard Saxo bodykit found on the VTR and VTS with a more insurance friendly 1.4-liter engine. The Westcoast is not to be confused with the Eastcoast, which was only available in the 1.0L and later 1.1L engines. The Eastcoast also did not incorporate the "VT" bodykit.

Air conditioning was never an option on right hand drive Saxos because the blower motor was mounted in the bulk head on the driver's side. As a result, there was insufficient space available to accommodate the evaporator, except by first ducting the air flow to the passenger's side and then at the expense of the glove box.

Although an after market kit was available that did exactly this, the resultant pressure loss made the system noisy and ineffective. The blower motor could also not be easily relocated, since the windscreen wiper motor was mounted in the passenger's side space.

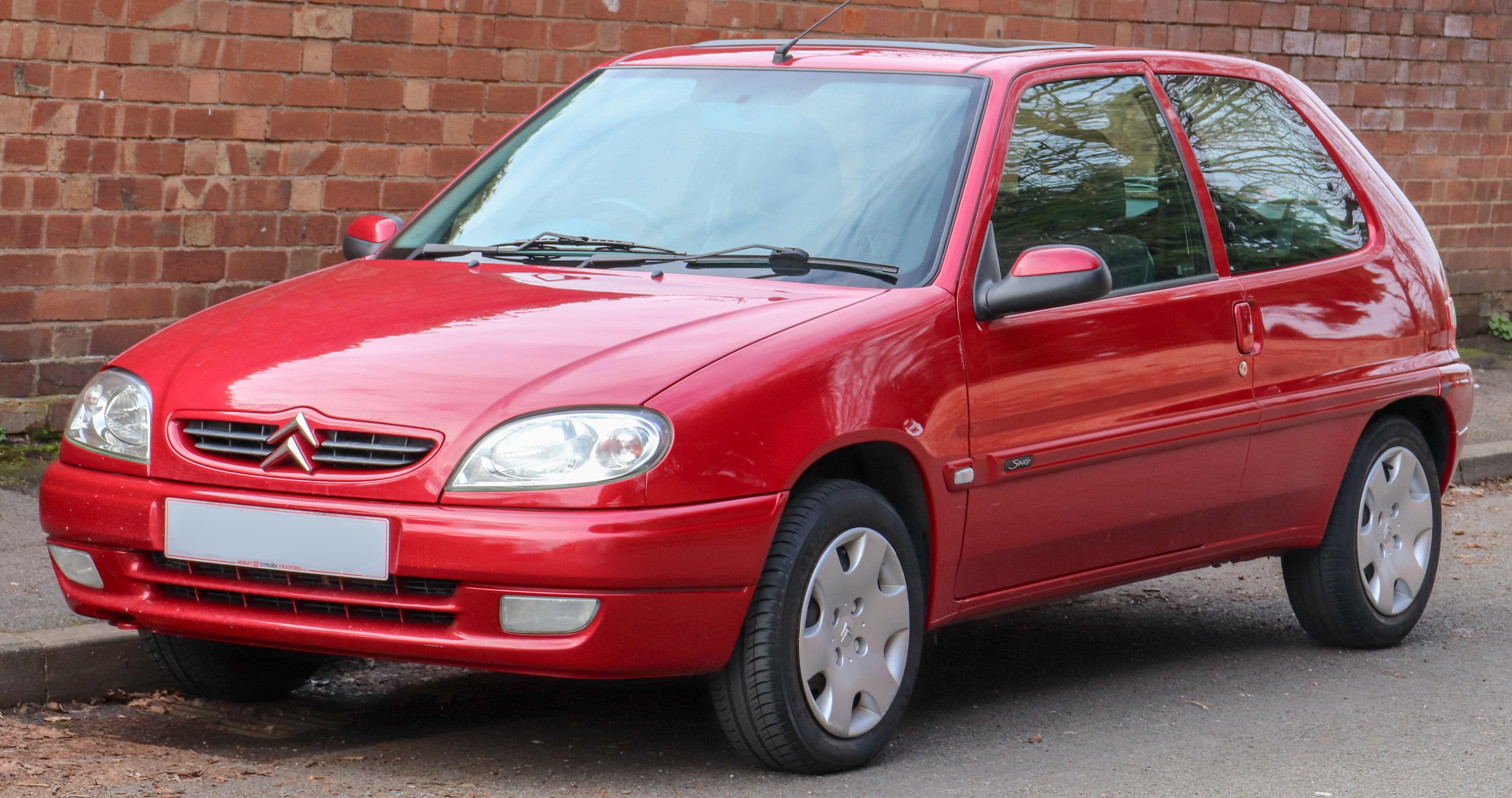

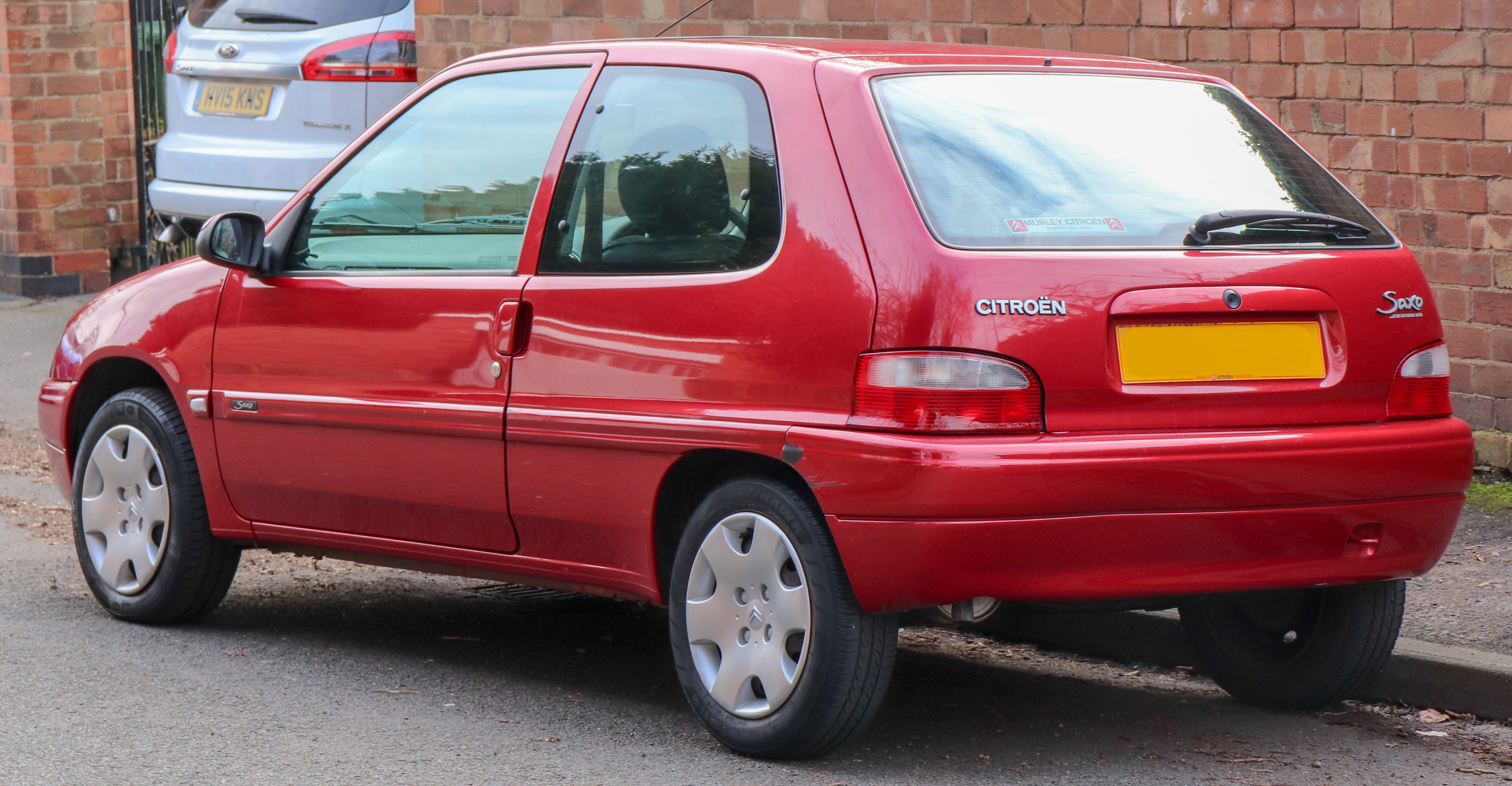
Citroën Saxo (facelift)

In September 1999, the Saxo received a facelift, commonly branded as a Mark II, with the major differences being more modern styled headlights, bonnet and grille to replace the square style on the MK1 and multipoint injection replacing the single point on the 1.1-liter engines. In September 2000, it was a Euro NCAP sufferer of poor results, along with its twin, the 106.

Power steering became standard on all but the very basic models. More subtle changes were alterations to the rear lights (the indicator sections are more "white") and the engine control unit moved from a single plug to three plugs. The old three-stud wheel layout, as used on the Citroën AX, was also dropped. There was also a minor facelift, during the first phase of the car's production, in line with the then current releases by Citroën, moving towards a rounder look.

While the exterior was markedly altered, little changed inside the vehicle. The dashboard and glovebox arrangement remained the same with the possibility of installing a passenger-side airbag in some high range models.

By 2003, some buyers were more attracted to the spacious, and practical five-door C3. However, the 1.6 VTR and VTS models remained popular. The Saxo finally finished production in September 2003, when the three-door C2 was launched. Its twin, the Peugeot 106, also ceased production at this time. Near the end of the Saxo's production life, its design was seven years old.

=== Drag coefficient ===
The Saxo has a drag coefficient of Cd=0.340. In addition its frontal area is 1.83 m^{2}, giving it a CdA ft² of 6.68.

== Motorsport ==
=== Rallying ===
The Citroën Saxo has competed in the S1600/Kit Car class in Rally events since 1997. The car notably appeared in the World Rally Championship between 1997 and 2007.

As of 2025, the car has racked up over 700 podiums and 200 wins.

=== Endurance Racing ===
The Citroën Saxo competed in endurance racing events in Germany and the Netherlands regularly between 1997 and 2007, mostly in the Nurburgring 24 Hours.

A Citroën Saxo notably competed in the 1998 Spa 24 Hours and finished 30th.

=== Junior Saloon Car Championship ===
The Citroen Saxo is the basis for the Junior Saloon Car Championship for young racing drivers aged 14 to 17 that has run since 2014.

Prior to 2014, the series was called the SAXMAX Championship and had run since 2006.

2014 Champion James Dorlin and 2022 Champion Max Hall went on to race in the British Touring Car Championship in 2025.
