= Country Club (TV program) =

Canadian television variety program

- Genre: Variety
- Presented by: Don Francks; Patti Lewis
- Country of origin: Canada
- Original language: English
- No. of seasons: 1
- No. of episodes: 13

Production
- Producer: Drew Crossan

Original release
- Network: CBC Television
- Release: 4 July – 26 September 1958

Country Club is a Canadian variety show that aired on CBC Television in 1958.

== Premise ==
This mid-year replacement program was hosted by Don Francks and Patti Lewis on a set which resembled a ballroom at a country club. The house band was led by Bert Niosi.

== Scheduling ==
The program was broadcast on Fridays at 9:30 p.m.

Date	Guests
4 July 1958	Lorne Greene
11 July 1958	Norma Locke (singer), The Taylor Twins (dancers)
18 July 1958	Joan Fairfax
25 July 1958	singers Ruth Walker, Hank Noble
1 August 1958	singer Noreen St Pierre
8 August 1958	singer Irene Andrian, singer-dancers Bill Yule and Sandra O'Neill
15 August 1958	
22 August 1958	singing group The Hi-Lites, comedian Wally Dean
29 August 1958	singers Colette Bonheur and Doug Romaine
5 September 1958	Alex Barris
12 September 1958	Janet Stowart
19 September 1958	Jim Hannan
26 September 1958	singer Josh White
