= Country Club Historic District =

Country Club Historic District may refer to:

- Country Club Historic District (Birmingham, Alabama), listed on the NRHP in Alabama
- Country Club Historic District (Denver, Colorado), listed on the NRHP in Colorado
- Country Club Historic District (Edina, Minnesota), listed on the NRHP in Minnesota
- Country Club Historic District (Omaha, Nebraska), listed on the NRHP in Nebraska
