= PSA Aulnay-sous-Bois Plant =

- Built: 1972
- Location: Aulnay-sous-Bois, France
- Coordinates: 48°57′48″N 2°28′59″E
- Industry: Automotive
- Products: cars
- Employees: 3,500 (2012)
- Area: 168.5 ha (416 acres)
- Defunct: 2014

The PSA Aulnay-sous-Bois Plant is a former car plant in France, producing approximately 135,700 cars in 2011. The plant was acquired by the PSA Group in 1976 when Peugeot took a majority stake in the Citroën company which had built the plant. The plant is located on the northern edge of Paris at Aulnay-sous-Bois, close to the A1, A3 and A104 autoroutes.

The plant became active on 24 April 1973, just one month before Citroën and Fiat announced their "divorce", ending a collaboration agreement entered into seven years earlier, in 1968.

The Aulnay plant's closure was scheduled for 2014, but in the end this was brought forward and the last car came off the line in October 2013.

The plant incorporated manufacturing, painting and assembly departments including, between 1979 and 2008, two assembly lines and all the ancillary activities of an integrated car plant. It also housed two divisions unique within the PSA group:

The "Anti-pollution" department is where the emissions of all new models were measured: it was due for closure in August 2012.
The "Citroën repository", opened in 2001 is where examples of all the brand's former models were gathered: the repository is not a museum and is not normally open to visitors.

== History ==
The Aulnay plant has hit the headlines many times over the years, often in connection with industrial unrest. Nevertheless, in 2003 it produced its six millionth car, and in 2003 production peaked at 447,575 vehicles produced by approximately 5,000 employees. (The figure did not include sub-contractors or temporary/agency workers.)

Closure plans became known by June 2011 thanks to the publication by the trades union at the plant of an internal document, the contents of which management confirmed a month later. A four-month-long strike took place during the first part of 2013 and on 30 August 2013 the company's management announced that the closure scheduled for 2014 would take place in October 2013. The final car, a Citroën C3, was produced on Friday, 25 October 2013 and purchased by the "Citroën Héritage" organisation.

== Products ==
The first cars produced at Aulnay were Citroën DS models, but this was in effect a pilot run of what was by 1973 becoming a "run-out" model. The first car to be produced by Aulnay in significant volumes was the Citroën CX, produced at Aulnay between 1974 and 1989, during which time 1,012,733 CXs emerged from the plant. Subsequently, Aulnay concentrated on the manufacturer's smaller models. Three other Aulnay models beat the one million threshold as follows:

- 1986 to 1995 : Citroën AX: 1,069,468 cars
- 1996 to 2003 : Citroën Saxo 1,662,290 cars
- 2001 to 2013 : Citroën C3 1,625,665 cars up to 2008

When the manufacturer found itself short of capacity for mechanically similar Peugeot models, production of these was also supplemented with output from Aulnay, notably in respect of the popular Peugeot 205 and 106 models.

By the time production ended in 2013 Aulnay had clocked up production of 8,568,391 automobiles.
