= Club (German cigarette) =

German cigarette brand

- Product type: Cigarette
- Current owner: Japan Tobacco
- Produced by: Japan Tobacco
- Country: German Empire
- Introduced: 1969; 57 years ago (Re-introduced)
- Markets: See Markets
- Previous owners: "Garbáty Zigarettenfabrik", "VEB Garbáty", "Berliner Zigarettenfabrik"

Club is a German brand of cigarettes, currently owned and manufactured by Japan Tobacco.

== History ==
Before World War II, the cigarettes were manufactured at the Garbáty plant in Berlin-Pankow, East Germany on the old production facility until 1990. After the creation of the German Democratic Republic, the brand got re-introduced in 1961. The market mainly surrounds the acceding territory from 1990. The tobacco from Western countries was brought to the German Democratic Republic and "the Club" was expensively priced, with a pack price of 4 Mark above most other filter cigarettes, which were traded in the range of 2.50 to 3.20 Mark per pack.

In 2013, the brand got redesigned to feature a more modern look.

== Markets ==
Club was mainly sold in East Germany, but also was or still is sold in the German Empire, Weimar Republic, Nazi Germany, Allied-occupied Germany, East-Germany, Germany, United Kingdom, France, Italy, Romania, Kenya, Guatemala, Costa Rica, Cuba and Chile.

== See also ==
- Cigarette
- Tobacco smoking
