= Club foot (disambiguation) =

Club foot or club feet is a congenital or acquired deformity.

Club foot may also refer to:

- The Clubfoot, painting by Jusepe de Ribera, now at the Louvre
- Club Foot, music venue in Austin, Texas, USA
- Club Foot (song), by Kasabian
- Club Foot Orchestra, avant garde musical group
- Club foot (furniture), a form of foot used in furniture design

== See also ==
- Klub Foot, London live music club
