= Citroën AX =

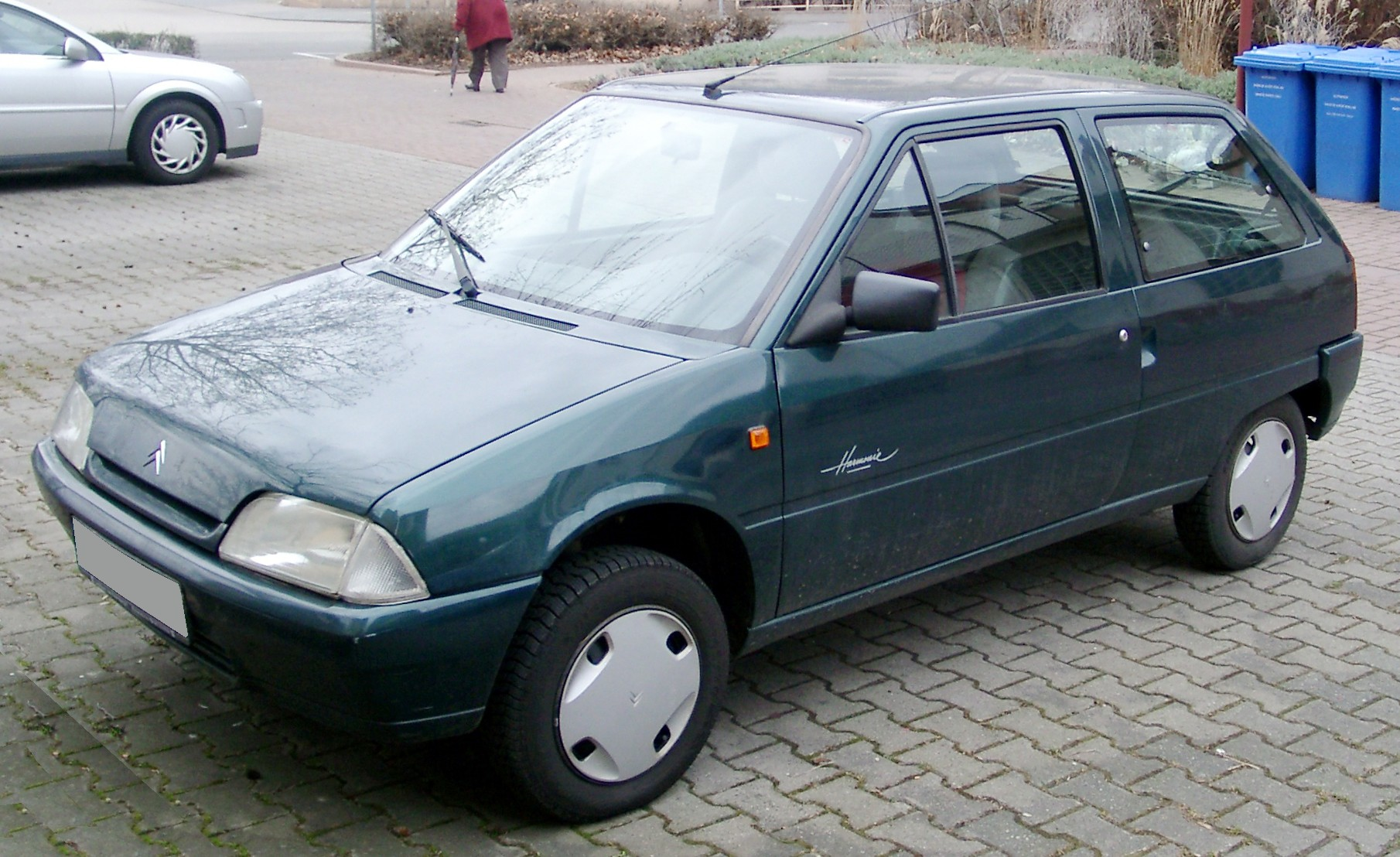

Overview
- Manufacturer: Citroën
- Also called: Proton Tiara
- Production: 1986–1998 (2,561,432 units)
- Assembly: France: Rennes (PSA Rennes Plant); Spain: Vigo (PSA Vigo Plant); Portugal: Mangualde (PSA Mangualde Plant); Yugoslavia: Koper (Cimos); Morocco: Casablanca (Sopriam)

Body and chassis
- Class: Subcompact Car (B)
- Body style: 3/5-door hatchback
- Layout: Front-engine, front-wheel-drive/four-wheel-drive
- Related: Peugeot 106; Citroën Saxo

Powertrain
- Engine: Petrol: 954 cc TU9 I4; 1124 cc TU1 I4; 1294 cc TU2 I4; 1360 cc TU3 I4; Diesel: 1360 cc TUD3 I4; 1527 cc TUD5 I4
- Electric motor: 11 kW/15 hp (DC electric motor)
- Transmission: 4-speed manual 5-speed manual

Dimensions
- Wheelbase: 2,280 mm (89.8 in)
- Length: 3,525 mm (138.8 in)
- Width: 1,555 mm (61.2 in)
- Height: 1,355 mm (53.3 in)
- Curb weight: 640–850 kg (1,411–1,874 lb)

Chronology
- Predecessor: Citroën LNA; Citroën Axel; Citroën Visa
- Successor: Citroën Saxo

The Citroën AX is a supermini car which was built by the French manufacturer Citroën from 1986 to 1998. It was launched at the 1986 Paris Motor Show to replace the Citroën Visa and Citroën LNA.

== Overview ==
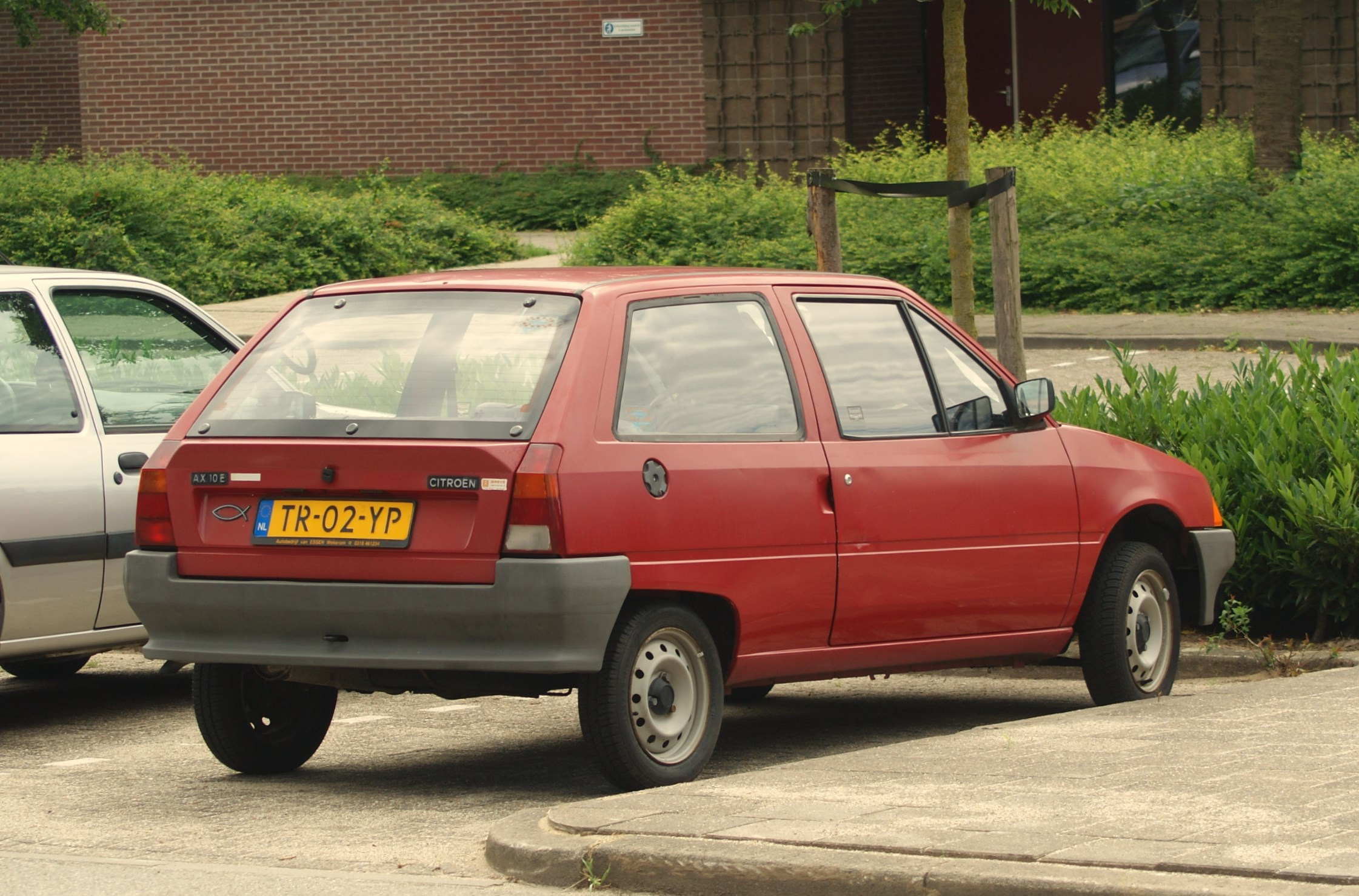
Rear of pre-facelift AX

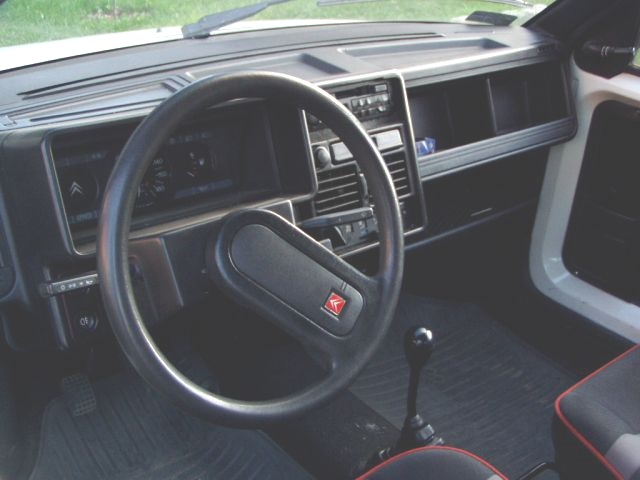
Interior of an early AX

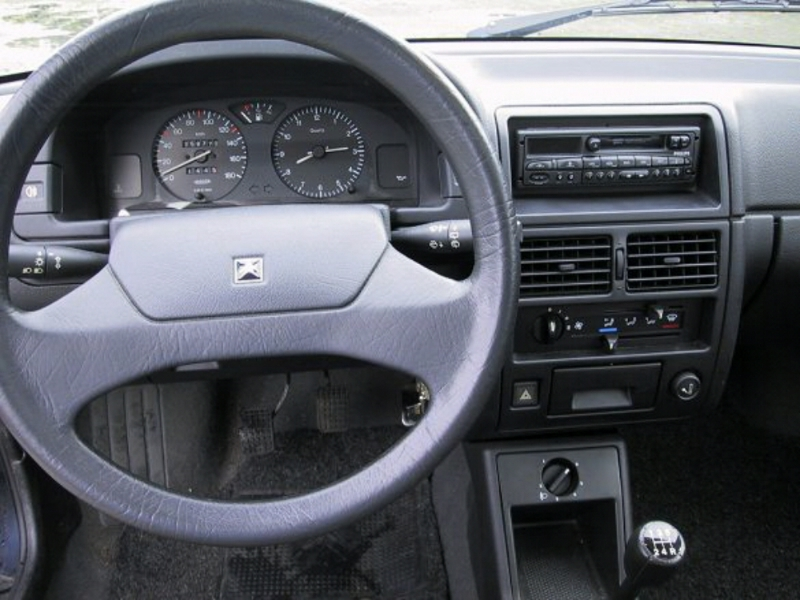
Interior of a later AX

Development of this model started in 1983, and it was initially also going to form the basis of a sister model from Talbot to replace the Samba; however, the falling popularity of the Talbot brand - coupled with the huge success of the new Peugeot 205 - had led to Peugeot deciding to axe it by the time the Citroën AX was launched, and so the Talbot version never made it into production.

The car was available on the left-hand drive continental markets from its launch on 2 October 1986, as a three-door hatchback with 1.0, 1.1 and 1.4 L TU-series belt driven OHC engines. A range of five-door models was added in 1987 and a 1.4 L diesel engine was introduced in 1988. The latter was replaced by a 1.5 L unit in September 1994. The right-hand drive version for the UK market was launched in August 1987, initially only as a three-door hatchback, with a five-door version joining the range a year later, effectively replacing the five-door Citroën Visa, which was discontinued that year. With the final demise of the classic Citroën 2CV in 1990, the AX became the smallest model in the Citroën range. The very earliest cars had an issue with gear shifters falling off; this was rectified by the time the AX reached export markets. It was initially backed by a memorable television advertising campaign filmed in China, starring actress Janet Mas and an elderly gentleman, whose character was simply known as Mr. Wong.

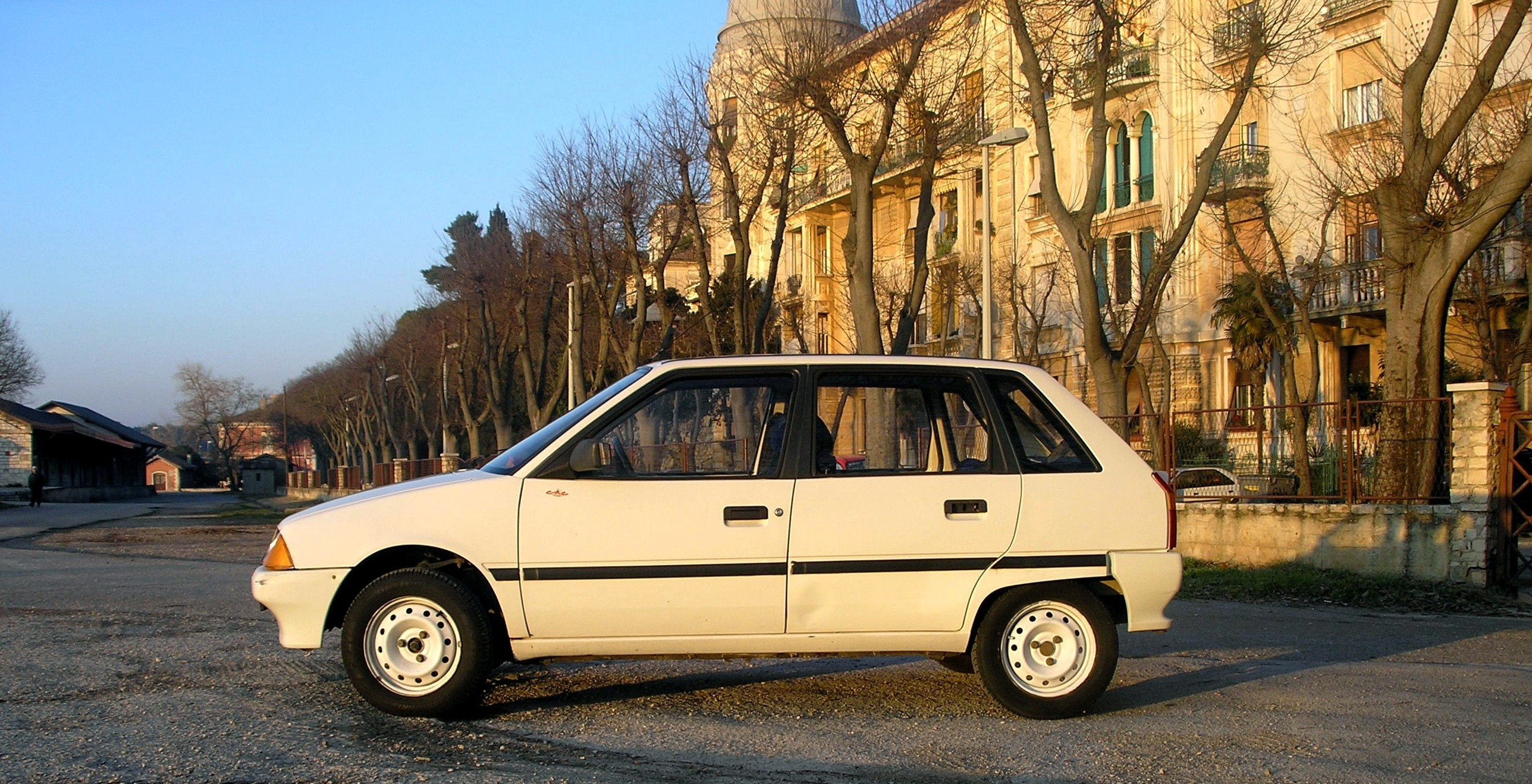
Citroën AX five-door

The car was very economical, largely because of excellent aerodynamics for its class of car (drag coefficient of 0.31) and a very light weight of 640 kg (1,411 lb) for the basic version. This was due to the extensive use of plastic panels in non-load bearing areas and varying the thicknesses of steel in the bodyshell to be the minimum needed to take required loads. Another target for the engineers was lowering friction in the engines. The AX has fully independent suspension with unusually long wheel travel.

It also optionally used self-coloured plastic bumpers. This technology came from the PSA Peugeot-Citroën / Renault / French government ECO 2000 project. The production version was much more conservative than the original 'one box' design prototype, that was closer to the Eco 2000 styling after negative reactions in focus groups. The "one-box" city car eventually came to market with the Renault Twingo, launched in 1992.

In 1989, a naturally aspirated diesel AX, using the 1360 cc, all aluminium alloy TUD engine, managed a figure of 2.82 litres per 100 kilometres (100 mpg_{‑imp}; 83 mpg_{‑US}), totalling over 1,000 miles (1,609 km) from Dover to Barcelona. This was the longest ever distance travelled on 10 imp gal (45.5 L; 12.0 US gal) of fuel and earned it a place in the Guinness Book of Records as the most economical production car. Also available was a 4x4 variant, but with limited success when compared to the rival Fiat Panda 4x4. The AX 4x4 was only available with five doors and was not sold in the United Kingdom.

The first performance version was the limited-run AX Sport from 1987, with a 1.3 engine and twin carburettors producing 95 PS (70 kW; 94 bhp), wearing iconic white steel wheels (5.5" x 13") which resembled those on its brother, the Peugeot 205 Rallye. The AX Sport used Solex ADDHE 40 carburettors until late 1988 and was then replaced with Weber DCOM 40s, just like the Peugeot 205 Rallye. The AX Sport had a shorter inlet manifold than the 205 Rallye, to save room in the smaller engine compartment. In phase 2 guise, the Sport was available in other colours and with optional GT wheels and rear spoiler.

Later, the AX 14 GT, with a single double-barrel carburetor 1.4L engine producing 85 PS (63 kW; 84 bhp), also found in the Peugeot 205 XS, was introduced. From 1991, this model utilised fuel injection to coincide with the revamp of the entire range and to meet tougher 1992 EU emission regulations that introduced exhaust catalytic converters.

=== Facelift ===
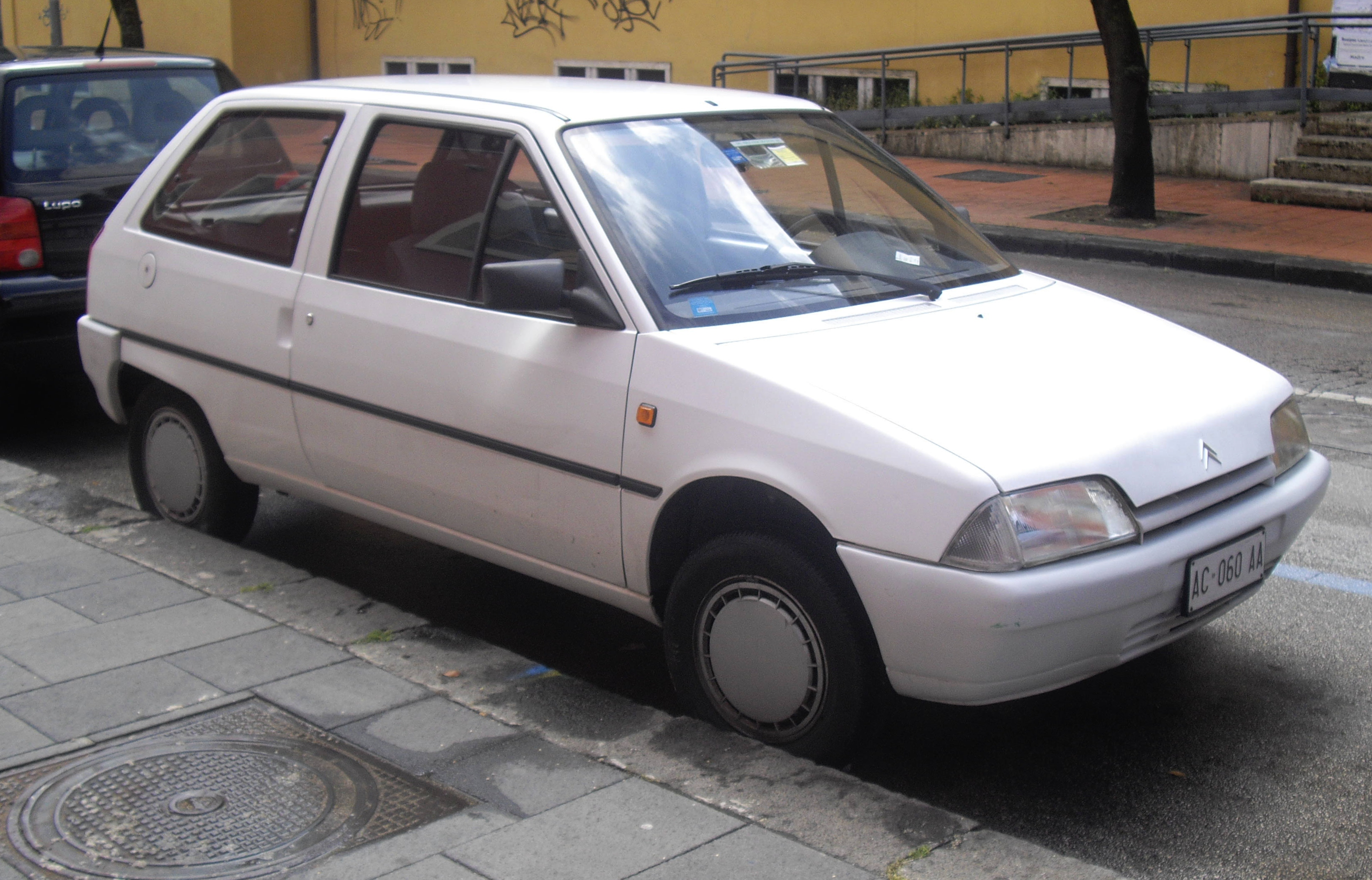
Post-facelift AX

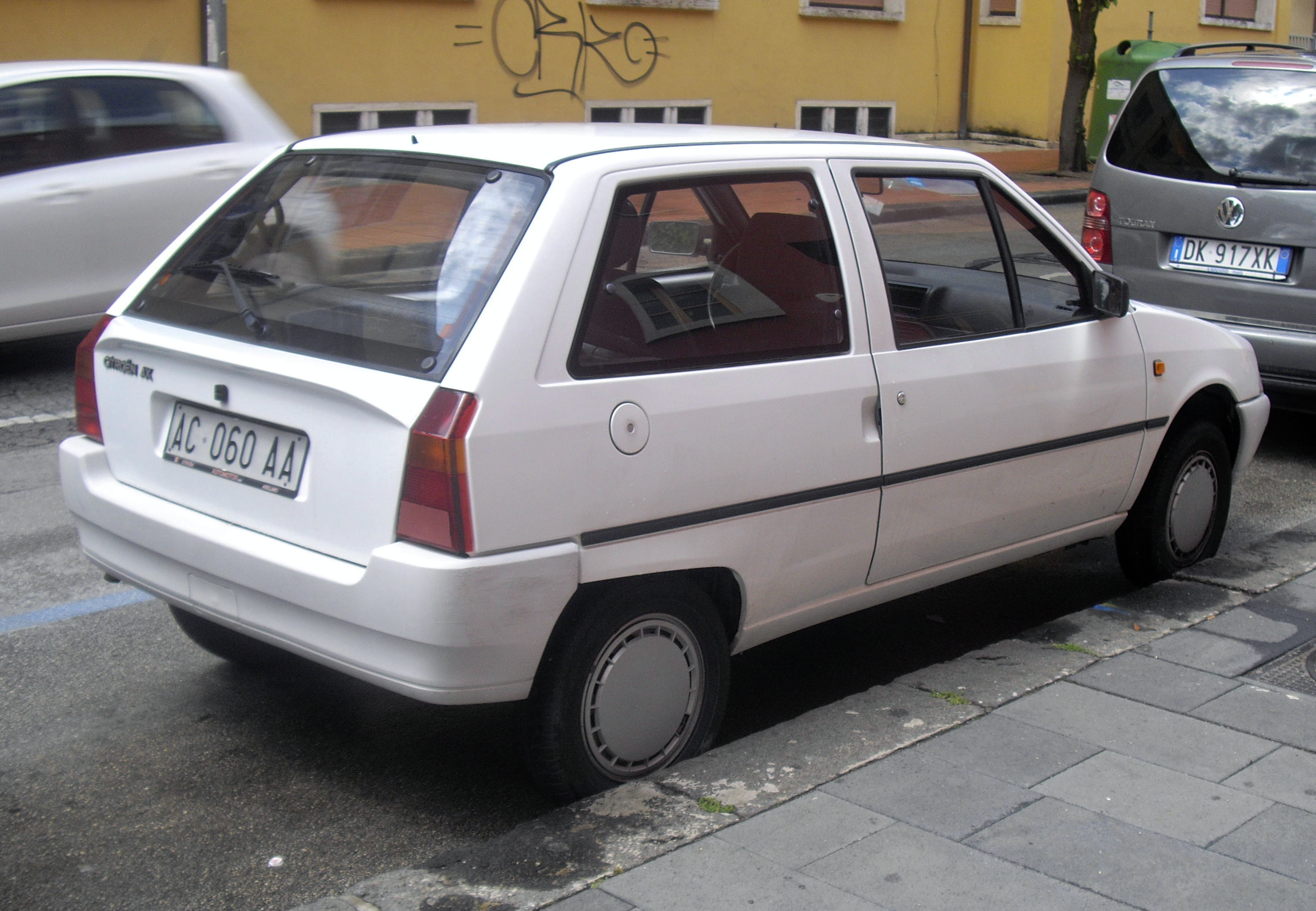
Rear of facelifted model

Late 1991 saw the range revised, with a heavily facelifted tailgate and interior being the most notable changes. The front turn signals were now clear, and the Citroën logo was moved to the center of the bonnet. The much maligned dashboard was replaced by a more conservative design.

The following year saw the introduction of the most powerful AX variant, the 100 PS (74 kW; 99 bhp) GTi. The GT was sold alongside the GTi for a few months, but was eventually phased out. New models were also introduced, mostly as limited editions, such as the Forte, Spree, Elation, and Dimension.

In January 1995, the Citroën AX Echo was launched, with a top speed of 110 mph (177 km/h). Its closest competitor, the Peugeot 106 Ski, (that shared components with the AX), was outsold by the Echo.

In November 1995 ('96 model year), the AX Électrique was introduced. It was available as a four-seater passenger car, but was sold mainly to administrations, for which it was offered as a two-seater panel van model. Some pre-production vehicles have been on the road since December 1993, notably in La Rochelle. The AX Électrique was equipped with a 20 kW engine with a maximum speed of 91 km/h. The traction battery is composed of 20 nickel-cadmium monoblocks. The AX Électrique can reach 50 km/h in 8.3 seconds. Citroën reported an estimated urban range of 75 km. The vehicle weighs 995 kg (980 kg for the LCV versions, stripped of their rear seats).

From June 1996, following the introduction of the Saxo, the range was slimmed-down, with production of the AX ending in December 1998, after a 12-year production run. In May 1997, the production of the AX in Vigo, Spain, ended after 812,000 vehicles produced in the factory. The assembly of the model was maintained in Mangualde, Portugal for some months. It had been withdrawn from the UK market during the first half of 1997, following the demise of right-hand drive production. A total of 2,561,432 AXs were produced.

The Peugeot 106 (launched in 1991) and Citroën Saxo were both developments of the AX. They followed the 1990s trend for heavier, more solid and 'safer' feeling cars that continues today. The AX was designed for lightness, with a 'less is more' philosophy, but with more conventional styling than previous Citroëns.

== Derivatives ==
In 1996, the EV3 engine (air engine) was mounted into a regular Citroën AX car by MDI. Heuliez presented an estate version called the AX Evasion at the 1988 Mondial de l'Automobile. Citroën also built a concept car named Xanthia based on the AX.

Besides the well known versions that are documented, Citroën also produced a few rare variants.

The Citroën AX BB Cabrio was a small roadster derived from the AX (1988). In Portugal, Citroën dealership Benjamin Barral from Amadora in Lisbon created an unofficial convertible version in the 1980s until about 1996 called the BB AX Cabrio, originally powered by the twin-choke carb AX GT 1.4 L engine, but later available with any type of engine that was available on the three-door AX.

At one stage, parent firm PSA Peugeot Citroën had planned to launch a Talbot Samba replacement as a version of the AX with a different grille and a Talbot badge, but this plan was cancelled, as the entire Talbot marque was axed on passenger cars by 1987 following several years of declining sales.

Automobiles Citroën also launched the AX Pistes Rouges 4WD 1400 model, based on the standard three-door AX GT 1360cc engine but with a unique four-wheel-drive system developed and produced by the French Dangel company. This was built between 1992 and 1994.

Malaysian car company Proton manufactured a version of the Citroën AX, the Proton Tiara, from 1996 to 2000.

=== Mega Club/Ranch ===
Aixam Mega at one time built an AX derivative called Mega Club and Mega Ranch. It was somewhat inspired by the Méhari, with a plastic bodywork and an optional convertible version, with two-wheel drive or four-wheel drive. It was discontinued in 1998, after nearly 1,000 had been built. A competition version of the Mega Club with a tubeframe chassis raced in the Andros Trophy in the early 1990, but powered by Ford and Honda engines.

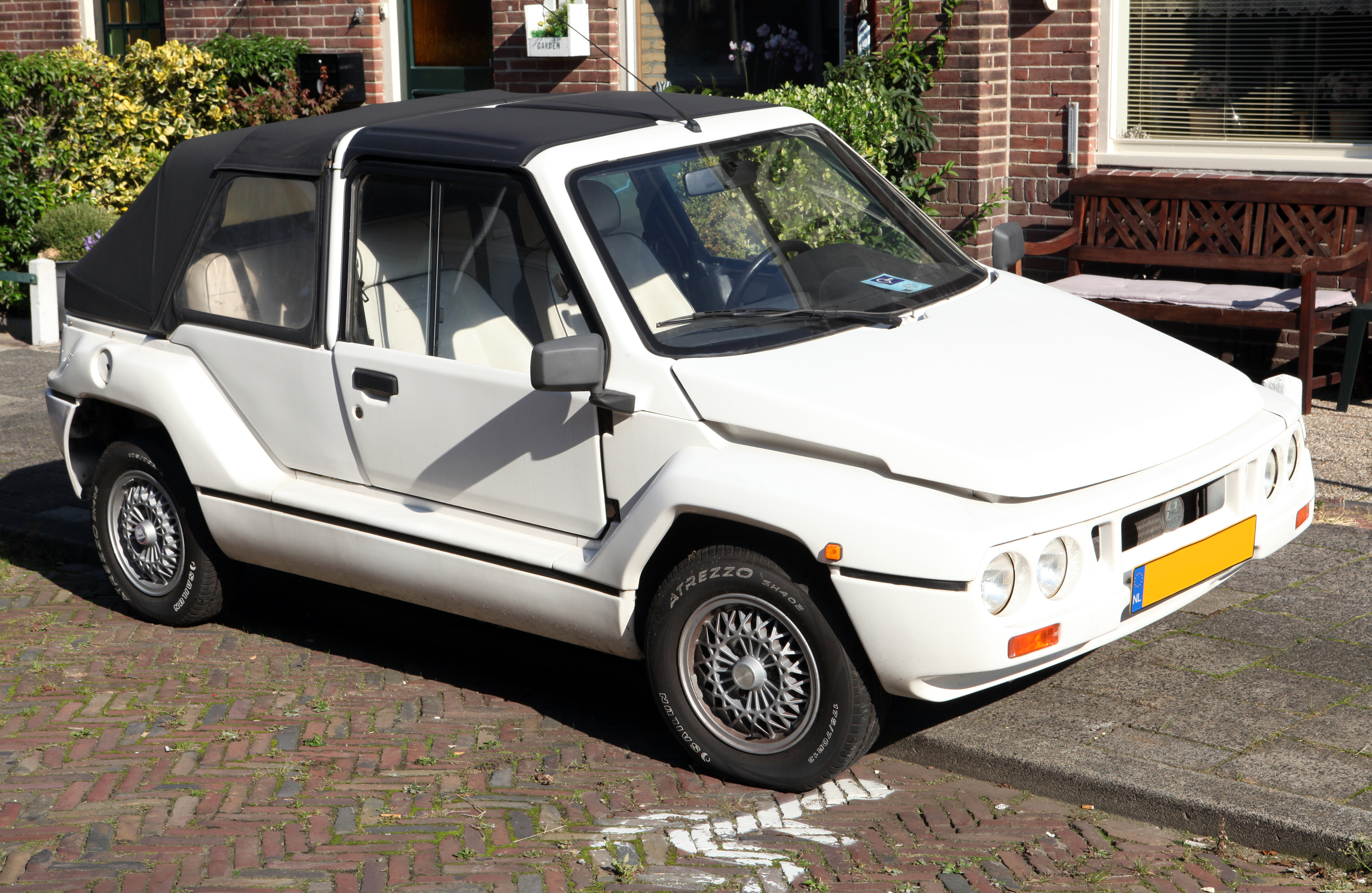
Mega Club cabriolet

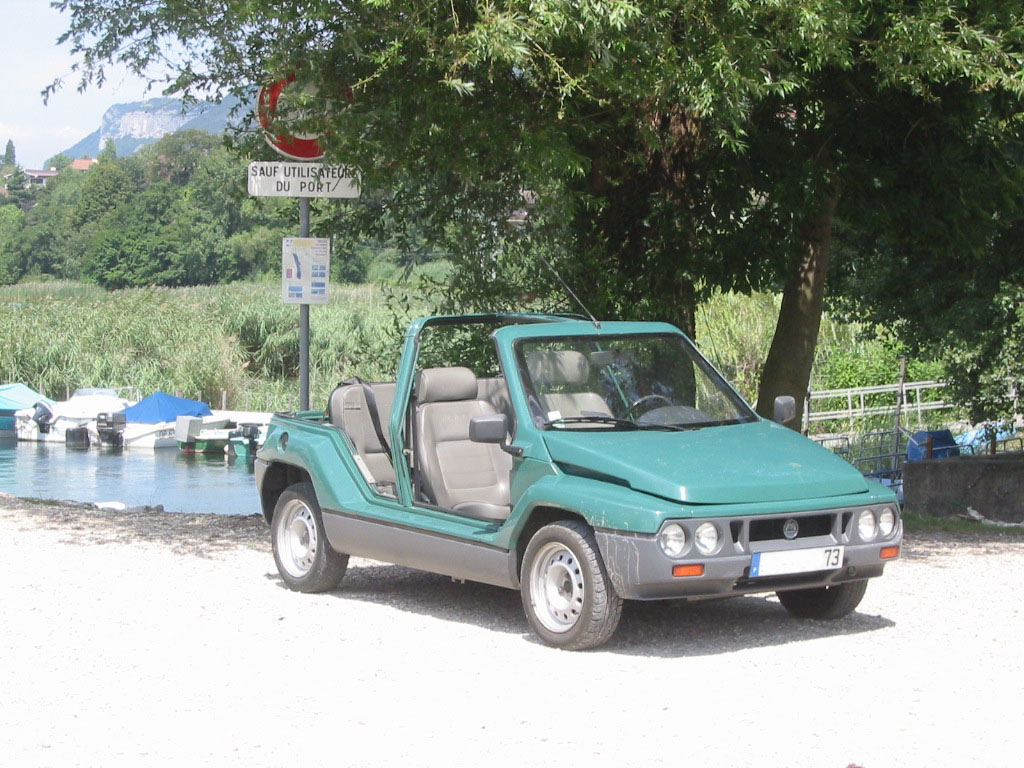
Mega Ranch cabriolet

=== AX Electrique ===
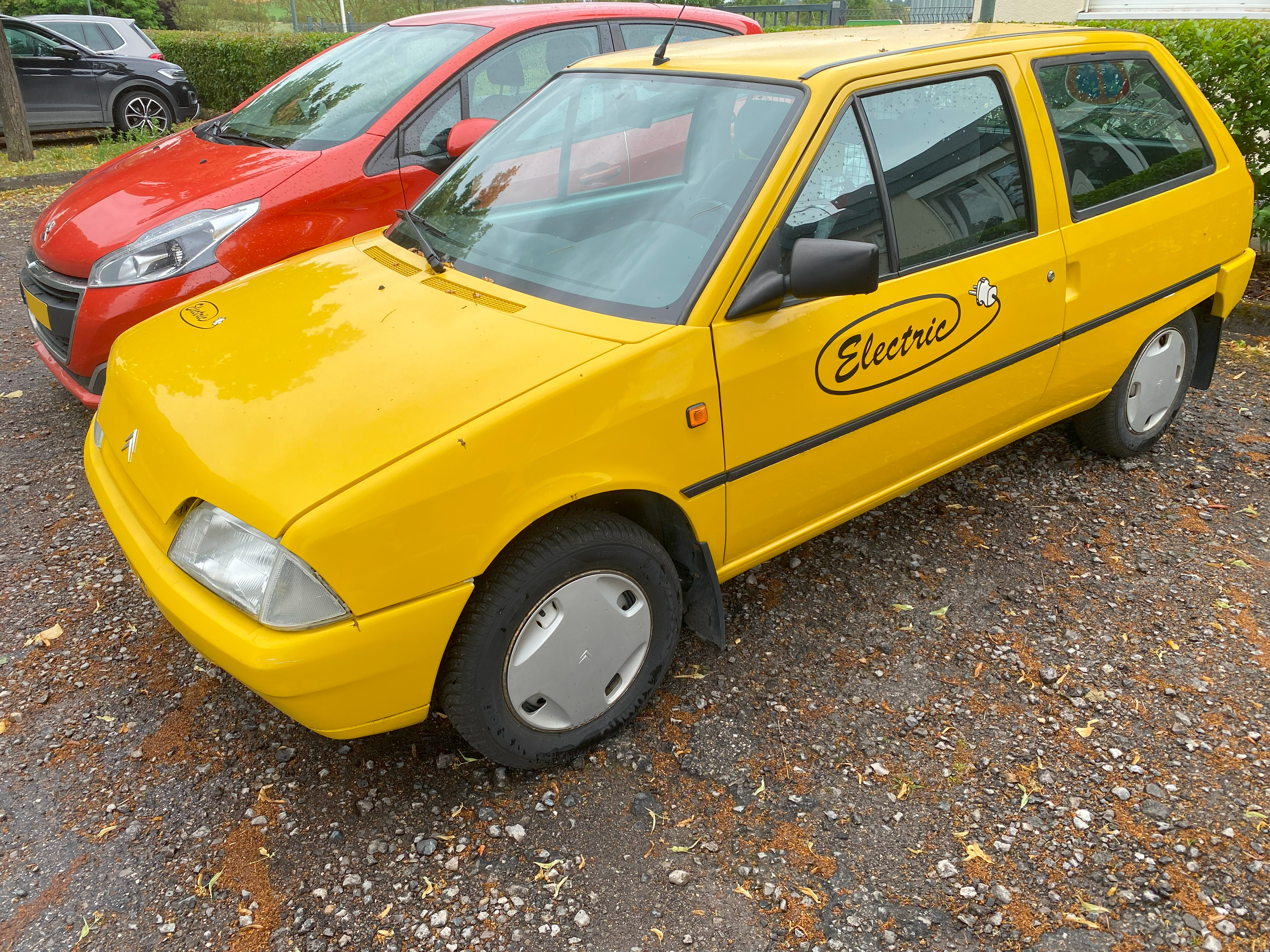
Citroën AX Electrique

Citroën worked with Heuliez to design an electric version of the AX, and produced 374 examples of the AX Electrique between December 1993 and 1996. The car featured 20 liquid-cooled, 100Ah Nickel-Cadmium (NiCad) batteries running at 120 V paired with a 20 kW (26 hp) separately excited brushed DC motor which was capable of this peak power figure for short periods of time, but had a nominal power output of only 11 kW (15 hp). The range was estimated by Citroën to be around 75 km (47 mi) with a top speed of 90 km/h (56 mph). Acceleration from 0-50 km/h is quoted at 8.3 seconds. The batteries used were 6V SAFT STM5-100's, advanced for the time and are still sold with minor changes today due to their excellent cooling ability, meaning charging was very fast for the time. The car also featured a proprietary fast charging system utilising the same input pins used to charge the car at home, and there were a number of such proprietary fast charging stations located around France permitting the car to recharge 20km in 10 minutes according to the Citroën Brochure. Other sources show the AX utilizing an AVCON port like many other EVs of the time. The AX Electrique sold for 80,000 French Francs when new. The Citroën AX Electrique was succeeded by the Citroën Saxo Electrique.

A modified version of the Citroën AX Electrique utilising Lithium-Iron-Phosphate batteries (LiFePO_{4}) by the CEA-Liten, a French government funded research organisation, set a world record in 2011 for a distance of 1,280 km driven in an electric vehicle within 24 hours using a relay-style technique of driving and fast charging the car. The modified version of the car featured a 14 kWh LiFePO_{4} battery in place of the original NiCad battery, which allowed the car to drive between 105-115 km before fast charging the car in 38 minutes for the next leg of the relay.

== Models ==
VDS	Model	Production
ZAZA	AX 10 E	1986–1990
ZAZA	AX Ten	1991–UK
ZAZA	AX 10 RE	1987–1989
ZAZB	AX 10 RE	1987–1988
ZALH	AX 10	1992–UK
ZAZB	AX 11 RE	1988–1990
ZAZB	AX 11 TE	1990–1991
ZAZB	AX 11 TGE	1990–1991
ZAZB	AX 11 TRE	1987–1989
ZAZB	AX 11 TRS	1990–1991
ZAZA	AX 11	1992–1994
ZAZP	AX 11	1994–UK
ZADA	AX 11	1994–UK
ZAZC	AX 11	1994–UK
ZAZC	AX 14 TRS	1987–1990
ZAZC	AX 14 TZX	1991–1991
ZADD	AX 14	1992–1994
ZAZD	AX 14	1992–1994
ZAZD	AX GT	1988–1992
ZADD	AX 14 GT	1992–1994
ZAZW	AX GT	1994–UK
ZADN	AX GTi	1991–1992
ZADM	AX GTi	1992–UK
ZALB	AX 4x4	1991–1992
ZALF	AX 4x4	1992–UK
ZAZL	AX Sport	1987–1991
ZAZA	AX K-Way	1988–1991
ZAZA	AX Spot	1991–1991
ZAZB	AX Image	1991–1991
ZAZB	AX Thalassa	1991–1991
ZAZD	AX Volcane	1991–1991
ZAZT	AX 14 D	1990–1991
ZAZT	AX 14 RD	1989–1990
ZAZT	AX 14 TGD	1991–1992
ZAZT	AX D	1992–1994
ZADF	AX 14 D	1994–UK
ZAKH	AX 15 D	1994–UK
ZAZH	AX 10 E	1988–1989
ZAZH	AX 10 RE	1988–1993
ZAZH	AX Ten	1991–1993
ZALJ	AX 10	1992–UK
ZAZJ	AX 11 TGE	1990–1991
ZAZJ	AX 11 RE	1988–1989
ZAZJ	AX 11 TE	1990–1991
ZAZJ	AX 11 TRE	1988–1989
ZAZJ	AX 11 TRS	1990–1991
ZADB	AX 11	1992–1994
ZAZ5	AX 11	1994–UK
ZAZB	AX 11	1994–UK
ZAZK	AX 11	1994–UK
ZAZK	AX 14 TRS	1988–1990
ZAZK	AX 14 TZS	1988–1989
ZAZK	AX 14 TZX	1991–1991
ZAZE	AX 14	1992–1994
ZAZY	AX 14	1994–UK
ZAZX	AX 14	1994–UK
ZAZY	AX GT	1990–1992
ZADE	AX GT	1992–1994
ZAZY	AX 14	1994–UK
ZAZX	AX 14	1994–UK
ZAZY	AX GT	1990–1992
ZADE	AX GT	1992–1994
ZAZU	AX 4x4	1991–1992
ZALG	AX 4x4	1992–UK
ZAZH	AX K Way	1988–1991
ZAZJ	AX Image	1991–1991
ZAZJ	AX Thalassa	1991–1991
ZAZU	AX 14 D	1989–1991
ZAZU	AX 14 RD	1989–1990
ZAZU	AX 14 TRD	1989–1991
ZAZU	AX 14 TGD	1991–1991
ZAZU	AX 14 D	1992–1994
ZADG	AX 14 D	1994–UK
ZAKJ	AX 15 D	1994–UK
ZAZU	AX Image D	1991–1991
ZAZU	AX Thalassa D	1991–1991
ZAXZ	AX Electrique	1993–1996
