= 1991 in motoring =

1991 in motoring includes developments in the automotive industry that occurred throughout the year 1991 by various automobile manufacturers, grouped by country. The automotive industry designs, develops, manufactures, markets, and sells motor vehicles.

== United Kingdom ==
The Vauxhall Astra was redesigned with the third-generation model in October 1991, seven years after the launch of the second generation model. It was available in 1.4, 1.6, 1.8 and 2.0 petrol engines as well as a 1.7 diesel (turbo or non-turbo). The 2.0 version came with 8-valve for the 2.0i CD and 2.0 SRi, while the 16-valve version came in the 130 mph+ GSi. All models got fuel injection as standard, as Britain prepared for the legislation which outlawed the sale of carburettor-engined cars after 1992.Also, parent brand Opel adopted the Astra name for the new car in Europe, ending the use of the long-running Kadett nameplate. In November, Vauxhall launched a new, small four-wheel-drive model, the Frontera which was offered as 3-door Sport or 5-door versions with a choice of a 2.4 petrol or a 2.3 diesel engine and was manufactured at its Luton plant.

The Ford Motor Company introduced a Cosworth version of the Granada Scorpio and Escort, as well as the new generation Escort XR3i. It has also revived the RS2000 nameplate for the Escort range, with a new 2.0 16-valve Zetec model that was capable of more than 130 mph. There was also a new estate version of the Granada Scorpio which launched in early 1992.

Rover updated its 800 Series executive model in November which now had a top speed of 135 mph on the turbocharged 2.0 Vitesse model. It also dropped the MG badge from faster versions of the Maestro and Montego models, which were now largely sold as budget offerings alongside the 200 and 400, but the MG badge was brought back for sale in 1992 on a remodelled, limited-edition version of the MG B.

== France ==
Peugeot launched a new entry-level model in November 1991 - the 106 - to slot into the range below the 205. With 1.1 and 1.4 petrol engines as well as a 1.5 diesel, the 106 was initially sold as only a three-door model. It was sold as a cheaper, more modern, though slightly smaller, alternative to the larger 205. Although the 205 was to continue for a few more years, the 309 would be replaced by 1993 with a new hatchback to be called the 306.

Citroën reentered the small family car market with its new ZX in March, launching in the UK in May which was the first of two replacements for the slightly larger BX. It comes with 1.4, 1.6 and 2.0 petrol engines and 1.9 diesels (turbo or non-turbo).

Renault launched its new Clio supermini in the UK in March. The range was expanded with the launch of a 1.8 16-valve hot hatch that was capable of 126 mph as the successor to the discontinued R5 Turbo. The second-generation Espace people carrier launched and received a V6 engine for the first time, while there was also a minor redesign of the R19 small family hatchback and saloon.

== Italy ==
Alfa Romeo gave a facelift to its 33 entry-level model, which had been on sale since 1983.

== Japan ==
Nissan launched the Sunny which was available as a three-door hatchback, five-door liftback and five-door estate. The Sunny's chassis also formed the basis of the 100NX coupe. A replacement for the long-running Micra was planned for the following year, joining the Primera at the Sunderland plant.

Honda launched a new version of its Civic family car. The new range includes a three-door hatchback and four-door saloon, and a five-door version of the Rover-based Concerto, which had been on sale for two years. Meanwhile, the current Accord was the year's best selling car in the United States.

== Germany ==
Volkswagen launched the MK3 Golf in August 1991, although UK sales would not start until February 1992. The new model was voted European Car of the Year. The Golf GTI was available as only a 1.8 16-valve, which is capable of 125 mph. The Golf VR6 was launched, a 2.8 engined hatchback capable of 140 mph.

Audi redesigned its 80 and 100 ranges. A new cabriolet version of the 80 also went on sale.

== See also ==
- 1990 in motoring - the previous year
- 1992 in motoring - the next year
