= 1993 in motoring =

This article 1993 in motoring deals with developments in the automotive industry that occurred throughout the year 1993 by various automobile manufacturers, grouped by country. The automotive industry designs, develops, manufactures, markets, and sells motor vehicles.

== United Kingdom ==
Ford's successor to the Sierra was the Mondeo, launched in January 1993 with sales beginning in March. It would receive the European Car of the Year award - as the automaker's large family car to compete with the Vauxhall Cavalier. After 10 years as a separate model, the Ford Orion, became part the Escort range from which was originally created. In June, Ford launched the Maverick four-wheel-drive model, based upon the Nissan Terrano II in 3 and 5-door versions to rival the Vauxhall Frontera.

Rover expanded its range with the launch of the 600 Series, a compact executive saloon car based on the Honda Accord. Its arrival in April 1993 saw the deletion of the Montego saloon from the range after nearly a decade, although the estate remained in production, as did the even older Maestro hatchback.

Vauxhall replaced the decade-old Nova with the completely new Corsa in April 1993 which like its predecessor is produced in Spain and unlike the Nova came only as a 3 or 5-door hatchback.

Following the insolvency of DAF NV (see the Netherlands section), Leyland DAF went into receivership. Two new independent British companies were established as the result of management buyouts of the respective parts of the old company: Leyland Trucks in Leyland, Lancashire took over the UK truck manufacturing interests, and LDV Group in Washwood Heath took over the van making business.

== France ==
The Peugeot 306, launched early in 1993, was the successor to the 309 and was also a partial replacement for the smaller, decade-old 205, which remains in production in lower numbers. Only 3 and 5-door hatchbacks were available at launch while saloon, cabriolet and estate bodystyles would arrive later

PSA launched of the all-new Xantia, a five-door large family hatchback that replaces the 11-year-old BX although the estate version wouldn't launch until late 1995 and the BX estate continued until July 1994.

Renault launches an all-new Laguna family car to replace its ageing R21. The continental launch came in December 1993, but British sales did not begin until April 1994.

== Italy ==
Fiat launched the new Punto supermini late in 1993, with British sales beginning in April 1994. It was the replacement for the long-running Uno, which finished production in Italy in 1995 but remained in production in Poland and Brazil.

== Germany ==
After 10 years of production, Mercedes-Benz replaced the 190E with the C-Class four-door compact executive saloon.

== Sweden ==
Fourteen years after the original version was introduced, Saab launched an all-new 900 range using the Vauxhall Cavalier/Opel Vectra platform. Production of the Volvo 240-series originated from the 140-series ends.

== Spain ==
SEAT, the Spanish subsidiary of Volkswagen, introduced an all-new version of the Ibiza supermini styled by Italian designer Giugiaro.

== Netherlands ==
DAF NV became insolvent. DAF Trucks was re-established as an independent truck maker following a management buyout of the Dutch interests of the company.

== See also ==
- 1992 in motoring - the previous year
- 1994 in motoring - the next year
