= 1990 in motoring =

1990 in motoring includes developments in the automotive industry throughout the year 1990 by various automobile manufacturers, grouped by country. The automotive industry designs, develops, manufactures, markets, and sells motor vehicles.

== United Kingdom ==
Ford launched a new, fifth generation Escort in September 1990, ten years after the last new model was launched. The new Escort was available with 1.3, 1.4, 1.6 and 1.8 petrol engines as well as a 1.8 diesel. Other models had extras including electric windows, power steering, anti-lock brakes and central locking. There was also a saloon version, the Orion. While still very popular, the range was criticised by the motoring press due to its dull styling inside and out, mediocre driving experience and old engine range. Meanwhile, the Granada finally saw a reintroduction of a saloon model.

Rover launched an updated Metro in May which added styling modifications to the previous design. The previous 1.0 and 1.3 A-Series engines were replaced with a new 16-valve K-Series units, with a choice of 1.1 or 1.4 litres. The saloon version of the 200 Series - the 400 Series - went on sale in April as a competitor to the Ford Sierra and Vauxhall Cavalier. In spite of the recent launches of similar-sized cars, Rover was still producing the Maestro and Montego ranges, though now in lesser numbers.

== Japan ==
Nissan ended its use of the Bluebird name on the launch of its new large-sized range of hatchbacks, saloons and estates - the Primera - in September 1990. Power came from 1.6 and 2.0 petrol engines as well as a 2.0 diesel. The hatchbacks and saloons were produced at the Sunderland plant in England, but the estates were fully made up in Japan. There was a wide range of trims. Meanwhile, its Micra range was the 11th most popular car in Britain during 1990, making it the fifth most popular car in its sector and the most popular car imported from Japan. An updated Sunny range would follow in 1991. At the supercar end of the market, Nissan had launched the 300ZX, with a top speed of 155mph to compete with cars such as the Porsche 911.

== France ==
Renault launched the new Clio, a range of three and five-door hatchbacks on the continent in May 1990 and would arrive on the British market in March 1991. Power came from a new range of 1.2, 1.4 and 1.6 petrol engines as well as a 1.9 diesel. The Clio was the replacement for the R5, though the car was still being built in Slovenia. Renault also had a new, smaller model planned for a 1992 launch.

After 42 years of continuous production, Citroen finally axes the iconic "tin snail" the 2CV from its line-up with the final models made in July at its plant in Portugal where it was produced for the last 2 years.

== Germany ==
BMW launched a new 3 Series late in 1990, for the compact executive market, ranging from basic 1.9 litre to the 2.5 litre petrol engine unit. Equipment levels were generally good, but some of the less expensive models had a radio and sunroof as only optional extras. The 3 Series range included a four-door saloon, and the remainder of the old 3 Series range remained on sale until the forthcoming new coupé, cabriolet and estate replacements were launched.

Volkswagen gave the Polo a major restyle to its exterior and interior after nine years on sale. A completely removable stereo/cassette player was added as a new security measure. The 1.0 and 1.3 petrol engines were carried over from the original 1981 Polo, but there were two more powerful versions of the 1.3 - the "GT" and "G40". Sales began in the autumn of 1990. In 1991 launch was planned of the third generation Golf.

== Italy ==
Fiat had given the seven-year-old Uno a major redesign in 1989, with the interior and exterior changed substantially. There was a new 1.0 petrol engine at entry-level, with a 1.4 option at the top end of the range. Some models had electric windows, central locking and a sunroof as optional extras. The Uno Turbo continued as Fiat's rival for the Peugeot 205 GTi and Ford Fiesta XR2i.

Alfa Romeo expanded the 164 range to include a lower priced 2.0 four-cylinder version.

The Lancia Prisma, saloon version of the Delta hatchback, was replaced with the new Dedra.

== See also ==
- 1989 in motoring - the previous year
- 1991 in motoring - the next year
