= 1992 in motoring =

1992 in motoring includes developments in the automotive industry that occurred throughout the year 1992 by various automobile manufacturers, grouped by country. The automotive industry designs, develops, manufactures, markets, and sells motor vehicles.

== United Kingdom ==
The new version of the Ford Escort was Britain's best-selling car during 1992. Ford gave the Escort a mild redesign in September with the introduction of new 16-valve fuel-injected Zetec petrol engines, while the 1.8 diesel received a turbocharger. A similar redesign was given to the Orion saloon version. All models had at least one airbag as standard, with most of the range having a passenger airbag and others also having anti-lock brakes. The Ford Fiesta received a mild update in the Summer.

Vauxhall's Cavalier was Britain's second-best selling car in 1992, and for the third year in succession it was the best-selling car in its sector. Vauxhall facelifted the Cavalier range and included a driver's airbag on all models, as well as a passenger airbag and anti-lock brakes being available on most of the range.

Rover Group announced coupe and cabriolet models of its 200 Series hatchback, with a new Honda Accord based saloon, the 600 Series, due on sale in the spring of 1993, with the Montego saloon due to be discontinued at that stage, although there was still no set date for the end of Montego estate or Maestro production.

== Japan ==
Nissan launched a new Micra supermini range to replace the nine-year-old original model. Powered by 1.0 and 1.3 16-valve petrol engines, the Micra was built at the Sunderland plant in England and was the first Japanese product to be voted European Car of the Year. UK sales commenced in January 1993.

A year after launching its latest version of the Civic, Honda launched a new version of the larger Accord. It was powered by 1.8, 2.0 and 2.2 petrol engines, and was available as a four-door saloon. Honda's venture with Rover continued the following year with the launch of the 600 Series, which was based on the same bodyshell as the Accord but using Rover's own engines although neither would launch until 1993.

== France ==
Renault announced the end of production of one of the R4, one of the world's longest-running cars, having been produced for 31 years. - The last six of which were in Argentina. Its place as Renault's entry-level model was taken by the new Twingo, a three-door compact hatchback which is comparable in size to Fiat's then new Cinquecento. Its interior space used a one-box design Most of its mechanicals were derived from the 20-year-old R5, which was still in production in Slovenia three years after the launch of its successor, the Clio. Sales in France began in April 1993 but would never be sold in RHD markets like the UK.

Renault also launched the Safrane, a large hatchback which replaced the R25 as Renault's competitor to the likes of the Ford Granada Scorpio and Vauxhall Carlton/Opel Omega.

== Germany ==
A year after the launch of its award-winning MK3 Golf, Volkswagen launched the Vento – the saloon version of the Golf, to replace the Jetta. Like the Golf, it was available with a range of petrol engines (1.6, 1.8 and 2.0) as well as a 1.9 turbo-diesel. There was also a 2.8 VR6, with a top speed of around 140 mph.

Mercedes-Benz upgraded its SL range with a few styling changes as well as the replacement of the six-cylinder 3.0 engine with two new 2.8 and 3.2 V6 units, both of which had the same power output as the original smaller engine. There was also a 6.0 V12 engine in addition to the 5.0 V8 that was previously the range-topping model.

== Italy ==
The Fiat 126 ceased production after 20 years and was replaced by the Cinquecento. Like the 126, the Cinquecento was a three-door entry-level hatchback. Unlike its predecessor, the new offering had front-wheel drive and a front-mounted engine. It carried over the 126's 700cc engine, but also made use of a 900cc unit which was capable of more than 80 mph.

Alfa Romeo ceased production of the 75 after six years and replaced it with the new 155, a four-door sports saloon.

== Sweden ==
Production of the long-running 740/760 and 240/260 ranges was planned to end at Volvo, as the new 850 range of saloons and estates had gone on sale. The new range, all with five-cylinder engines, was designed to compete with the likes of the BMW 5 Series and Mercedes-Benz E-Class, with front-wheel drive instead of the customary rear-wheel drive. Some versions were available with four-wheel drive, including the 155 mph range-topping "R" version.

== See also ==
- 1991 in motoring – the previous year
- 1993 in motoring – the next year
