= 2001 Rally Catalunya =

4th round of the 2001 World Rally Championship

2001 Rally Catalunya 37th Rallye Catalunya - Costa Brava
Round 4 of the 2001 World Rally Championship season
← Previous event	Next event →
- Host country: Spain
- Rally base: Lloret de Mar
- Dates run: March 23, 2001 – March 25, 2001
- Stages: 18 (383.18 km; 238.10 miles)
- Stage surface: Asphalt
- Overall distance: 1,779.13 km (1,105.50 miles)

Statistics
- Crews: 74 at start, 36 at finish

Overall results
- Overall winner: (France) Didier Auriol (France) Denis Giraudet (France) Peugeot Total; Peugeot 206 WRC

The 2001 Rally Catalunya (formally the 37th Rallye Catalunya - Costa Brava) was the fourth round of the 2001 World Rally Championship. The race was held over three days between 23 March and 25 March 2001, and was won by Peugeot's Didier Auriol, his 20th win in the World Rally Championship.

== Background ==
=== Entry list ===
No.	Driver	Co-Driver	Entrant	Car	Tyre
World Rally Championship manufacturer entries
2	(France) Didier Auriol	(France) Denis Giraudet	(France) Peugeot Total	Peugeot 206 WRC	M
3	(Spain) Carlos Sainz	(Spain) Luis Moya	(United Kingdom) Ford Motor Co. Ltd.	Ford Focus RS WRC '01	P
4	(United Kingdom) Colin McRae	(United Kingdom) Nicky Grist	(United Kingdom) Ford Motor Co. Ltd.	Ford Focus RS WRC '01	P
5	(United Kingdom) Richard Burns	(United Kingdom) Robert Reid	(Japan) Subaru World Rally Team	Subaru Impreza S7 WRC '01	P
6	(Norway) Petter Solberg	(United Kingdom) Phil Mills	(Japan) Subaru World Rally Team	Subaru Impreza S7 WRC '01	P
7	(Finland) Tommi Mäkinen	(Finland) Risto Mannisenmäki	(Japan) Marlboro Mitsubishi Ralliart	Mitsubishi Lancer Evo 6.5	M
8	(Belgium) Freddy Loix	(Belgium) Sven Smeets	(Japan) Marlboro Mitsubishi Ralliart	Mitsubishi Carisma GT Evo VI	M
9	(Italy) Piero Liatti	(Italy) Carlo Cassina	(South Korea) Hyundai Castrol World Rally Team	Hyundai Accent WRC2	M
10	(United Kingdom) Alister McRae	(United Kingdom) David Senior	(South Korea) Hyundai Castrol World Rally Team	Hyundai Accent WRC2	M
11	(Germany) Armin Schwarz	(Germany) Manfred Hiemer	(Czech Republic) Škoda Motorsport	Škoda Octavia WRC Evo2	M
12	(Belgium) Bruno Thiry	(Belgium) Stéphane Prévot	(Czech Republic) Škoda Motorsport	Škoda Octavia WRC Evo2	M
16	(France) Gilles Panizzi	(France) Hervé Panizzi	(France) Peugeot Total	Peugeot 206 WRC	M
World Rally Championship entries
1	(Finland) Marcus Grönholm	(Finland) Timo Rautiainen	(France) Peugeot Total	Peugeot 206 WRC	M
14	(France) Philippe Bugalski	(France) Jean-Paul Chiaroni	(France) Automobiles Citroën	Citroën Xsara WRC	M
15	(Spain) Jesús Puras	(Spain) Marc Martí	(France) Automobiles Citroën	Citroën Xsara WRC	M
17	(France) François Delecour	(France) Daniel Grataloup	(United Kingdom) Ford Motor Co. Ltd.	Ford Focus RS WRC '01	P
18	(Estonia) Markko Märtin	(United Kingdom) Michael Park	(Japan) Subaru World Rally Team	Subaru Impreza S7 WRC '01	P
19	(France) Jean-Joseph Simon	(France) Jack Boyère	(France) Jean-Joseph Simon	Peugeot 206 WRC	M
20	(Spain) Luis Climent Asensio	(Spain) Álex Romaní	(Spain) Escudería Bengala	Toyota Corolla WRC	M
21	(Spain) Salvador Cañellas Jr.	(Spain) Alberto Sanchís	(Spain) Seat Sport	Seat Cordoba WRC Evo3	P
22	(Portugal) Adruzilo Lopes	(Portugal) Luís Lisboa	(Portugal) Peugeot Esso Silver Team SG	Peugeot 206 WRC	M
23	(Belgium) Kris Princen	(Belgium) Dany Colebunders	(Belgium) Peugeot Bastos Racing	Peugeot 206 WRC	M
24	(Spain) Marc Blázquez	(Spain) Jordi Mercader	(Spain) Seat Sport	Seat Cordoba WRC Evo3	P
25	(Finland) Janne Tuohino	(Finland) Petri Vihavainen	(Finland) Janne Tuohino	Toyota Corolla WRC	—N/a
75	(United Kingdom) David Scialom	(United Kingdom) Kevin Clark	(United Kingdom) David Scialom	Mitsubishi Lancer Evo V	—N/a
76	(Netherlands) Mark Breijer	(Netherlands) Hans van Goor	(Netherlands) Mark Breijer	Subaru Impreza S5 WRC '98	P
78	(Austria) Achim Mörtl	(Austria) Stefan Eichhorner	(Austria) Promotor World Rally Team	Subaru Impreza S6 WRC '00	P
79	(Italy) Riccardo Errani	(Italy) Stefano Casadio	(Italy) Riccardo Errani	Subaru Impreza 555	P
Group N Cup entries
26	(Uruguay) Gustavo Trelles	(Argentina) Jorge Del Buono	(Uruguay) Gustavo Trelles	Mitsubishi Lancer Evo VI	P
27	(Argentina) Gabriel Pozzo	(Argentina) Daniel Stillo	(Argentina) Gabriel Pozzo	Mitsubishi Lancer Evo VI	P
28	(Sweden) Stig Blomqvist	(Venezuela) Ana Goñi	(United Kingdom) David Sutton Cars Ltd	Mitsubishi Lancer Evo VI	M
29	(Argentina) Marcos Ligato	(Argentina) Rubén García	(Argentina) Marcos Ligato	Mitsubishi Lancer Evo VI	P
82	(Belgium) Bob Colsoul	(Belgium) Tom Colsoul	(Belgium) Bob Colsoul	Mitsubishi Lancer Evo VI	—N/a
83	(Lebanon) Roger Feghali	(Italy) Nicola Arena	(France) Mistral Racing	Mitsubishi Lancer Evo VI	—N/a
84	(Italy) Fabio Frisiero	(Italy) Simone Scattolin	(Italy) Fabio Frisiero	Mitsubishi Lancer Evo VI	—N/a
85	(Spain) Joan Font	(Spain) Manel Muñoz	(Spain) Escudería Voltregá	Mitsubishi Lancer Evo VI	—N/a
86	(Poland) Paweł Dytko	(Poland) Tomasz Dytko	(Poland) Paweł Dytko	Mitsubishi Lancer Evo VI	—N/a
87	(Italy) Angelo Proietti	(Italy) Piero Di Francesco	(Italy) Angelo Proietti	Mitsubishi Lancer Evo VI	—N/a
88	(Russia) Stanislav Gryazin	(Russia) Dmitriy Eremeev	(Russia) Stanislav Gryazin	Mitsubishi Lancer Evo VI	—N/a
89	(United Kingdom) Natalie Barratt	(Australia) Claire Parker	(United Kingdom) Natalie Barratt Rallysport	Mitsubishi Lancer Evo V	—N/a
91	(Portugal) Paulo Freire	(Portugal) Jorge Manuel Carvalho	(Portugal) Paulo Freire	Mitsubishi Lancer Evo VI	—N/a
95	(France) Jean-Yves Requin	(France) Carole Meslin	(France) Jean-Yves Requin	Peugeot 306 S16	—N/a
96	(Italy) Elvio Corradin	(Italy) Diego Nervo	(Italy) Elvio Corradin	Peugeot 306 S16	—N/a
97	(Luxembourg) Eric Degrotte	(Belgium) Philippe Robyns	(Luxembourg) Eric Degrotte	Honda Integra Type-R	—N/a
98	(France) Eddie Mercier	(France) Jean-Michel Veret	(France) Eddie Mercier	Renault Clio RS	—N/a
99	(United Kingdom) Ernie Graham	(United Kingdom) Robin Hernaman	(United Kingdom) Ernie Graham	Peugeot 306 S16	—N/a
100	(Spain) Josep Fornell Argany	(Spain) Xavier Avellan	(Spain) Gamace MC Competición	Peugeot 106 Rallye	—N/a
101	(Belgium) Michel Wilders	(Belgium) Danielle Wilders-Arend	(Belgium) Royal Racing Car Mosan	Honda Civic VTi	—N/a
102	(Spain) Edgar Llebaria	(Spain) Óscar Sánchez	(Spain) Gamace MC Competición	Peugeot 106 Rallye	—N/a
Super 1600 Cup entries
50	(Austria) Manfred Stohl	(Austria) Ilka Minor	(Italy) Top Run SRL	Fiat Punto S1600	P
51	(France) Patrick Magaud	(France) Guylène Brun	(United Kingdom) Ford Motor Co. Ltd.	Ford Puma S1600	—N/a
52	(Italy) Andrea Dallavilla	(Italy) Danilo Fappani	(Italy) R&D Motorsport	Fiat Punto S1600	M
53	(France) Sébastien Loeb	(Monaco) Daniel Elena	(France) Citroën Sport	Citroën Saxo S1600	M
54	(Belgium) Larry Cols	(Belgium) Yasmine Gerard	(Belgium) Peugeot Bastos Racing	Peugeot 206 S1600	M
55	(United Kingdom) Niall McShea	(United Kingdom) Michael Orr	(United Kingdom) Ford Motor Co. Ltd.	Ford Puma S1600	M
56	(Italy) Giandomenico Basso	(Italy) Flavio Guglielmini	(Italy) Top Run SRL	Fiat Punto S1600	M
57	(France) Cédric Robert	(France) Marie-Pierre Billoux	(France) Team Gamma	Peugeot 206 S1600	—N/a
58	(Spain) Sergio Vallejo	(Spain) Diego Vallejo	(Spain) Pronto Racing	Fiat Punto S1600	M
59	(France) Benoît Rousselot	(France) Gilles Mondésir	(United Kingdom) Ford Motor Co. Ltd.	Ford Puma S1600	—N/a
60	(Switzerland) Cyril Henny	(Switzerland) Aurore Brand	(Switzerland) Rally Team Henny	Citroën Saxo S1600	—N/a
61	(Italy) Corrado Fontana	(Italy) Renzo Casazza	(Italy) H.F. Grifone SRL	Peugeot 206 S1600	—N/a
62	(Finland) Jussi Välimäki	(Finland) Jakke Honkanen	(Finland) ST Motors	Peugeot 206 S1600	—N/a
63	(Norway) Martin Stenshorne	(United Kingdom) Clive Jenkins	(Norway) Zeta Racing	Ford Puma S1600	M
64	(Italy) Massimo Macaluso	(Italy) Antonio Celot	(Italy) R&D Motorsport	Fiat Punto S1600	—N/a
65	(Paraguay) Alejandro Galanti	(Uruguay) Daniel Muzio	(Italy) Astra Racing	Ford Puma S1600	—N/a
67	(Andorra) Albert Llovera	(Spain) Marc Corral	(Spain) Pronto Racing	Fiat Punto S1600	—N/a
68	(Italy) Massimo Ceccato	(Italy) Mitia Dotta	(Italy) Hawk Racing Club	Fiat Punto S1600	—N/a
69	(France) Nicolas Bernardi	(France) Delphine Bernardi	(France) Team Gamma	Peugeot 206 S1600	—N/a
71	(Belgium) François Duval	(Belgium) Jean-Marc Fortin	(United Kingdom) Ford Motor Co. Ltd.	Ford Puma S1600	—N/a
72	(Malaysia) Saladin Mazlan	(United Kingdom) Timothy Sturla	(Malaysia) Saladin Rallying	Ford Puma S1600	—N/a
73	(Italy) Christian Chemin	(Italy) Matteo Alberto Bacchin	(Italy) Hawk Racing Club	Fiat Punto S1600	—N/a

=== Itinerary ===
All dates and times are CET (UTC+1) from 23 to 24 March 2001 and CEST (UTC+2) on 25 March 2001.

Date	Time	No.	Stage name	Distance
Leg 1 — 101.00 km
23 March	09:58	SS1	La Trona 1	12.90 km
23 March	10:33	SS2	Alpens — Les Llosses 1	21.80 km
23 March	11:33	SS3	Vallfogona 1	15.80 km
23 March	13:51	SS4	La Trona 2	12.90 km
23 March	14:26	SS5	Alpens — Les Llosses 2	21.80 km
23 March	15:26	SS6	Vallfogona 2	15.80 km
Leg 2 — 163.78 km
24 March	08:55	SS7	Pratdip 1	31.57 km
24 March	10:06	SS8	Escaladei 1	14.43 km
24 March	12:04	SS9	La Riba 1	35.89 km
24 March	14:34	SS10	Pratdip 2	31.57 km
24 March	15:45	SS11	Escaladei 2	14.43 km
24 March	17:43	SS12	La Riba 2	35.89 km
Leg 3 — 118.40 km
25 March	08:36	SS13	Coll de Bracons 1	19.66 km
25 March	09:53	SS14	Osor 1	13.26 km
25 March	10:27	SS15	Collsesplanes 1	26.28 km
25 March	12:18	SS16	Coll de Bracons 2	19.66 km
25 March	13:35	SS17	Osor 2	13.26 km
25 March	14:09	SS18	Collsesplanes 2	26.28 km

== Results ==
=== Overall ===
Pos.	No.	Driver	Co-driver	Team	Car	Time	Difference	Points
1	2	(France) Didier Auriol	(France) Denis Giraudet	(France) Peugeot Total	Peugeot 206 WRC	3:40:54.7		10
2	16	(France) Gilles Panizzi	(France) Hervé Panizzi	(France) Peugeot Total	Peugeot 206 WRC	3:41:17.9	+23.2	6
3	7	(Finland) Tommi Mäkinen	(Finland) Risto Mannisenmäki	(Japan) Marlboro Mitsubishi Ralliart	Mitsubishi Lancer Evo 6.5	3:41:56.1	+1:01.4	4
4	8	(Belgium) Freddy Loix	(Belgium) Sven Smeets	(Japan) Marlboro Mitsubishi Ralliart	Mitsubishi Carisma GT Evo VI	3:43:11.4	+2:16.7	3
5	3	(Spain) Carlos Sainz	(Spain) Luis Moya	(United Kingdom) Ford Motor Co. Ltd.	Ford Focus RS WRC '01	3:43:30.4	+2:35.7	2
6	17	(France) François Delecour	(France) Daniel Grataloup	(United Kingdom) Ford Motor Co. Ltd.	Ford Focus RS WRC '01	3:43:38.4	+2:43.7	1

=== World Rally Cars ===
==== Classification ====
Position		No.	Driver	Co-driver	Entrant	Car	Time	Difference	Points
Event	Class	No.	Driver	Co-driver	Entrant	Car	Time	Difference	Points
1	1	2	(France) Didier Auriol	(France) Denis Giraudet	(France) Peugeot Total	Peugeot 206 WRC	3:40:54.7		10
2	2	16	(France) Gilles Panizzi	(France) Hervé Panizzi	(France) Peugeot Total	Peugeot 206 WRC	3:41:17.9	+23.2	6
3	3	7	(Finland) Tommi Mäkinen	(Finland) Risto Mannisenmäki	(Japan) Marlboro Mitsubishi Ralliart	Mitsubishi Lancer Evo 6.5	3:41:56.1	+1:01.4	4
4	4	8	(Belgium) Freddy Loix	(Belgium) Sven Smeets	(Japan) Marlboro Mitsubishi Ralliart	Mitsubishi Carisma GT Evo VI	3:43:11.4	+2:16.7	3
5	5	3	(Spain) Carlos Sainz	(Spain) Luis Moya	(United Kingdom) Ford Motor Co. Ltd.	Ford Focus RS WRC '01	3:43:30.4	+2:35.7	2
7	6	5	(United Kingdom) Richard Burns	(United Kingdom) Robert Reid	(Japan) Subaru World Rally Team	Subaru Impreza S7 WRC '01	3:43:57.5	+3:02.8	0
10	7	12	(Belgium) Bruno Thiry	(Belgium) Stéphane Prévot	(Czech Republic) Škoda Motorsport	Škoda Octavia WRC Evo2	3:46:58.6	+6:03.9	0
11	8	10	(United Kingdom) Alister McRae	(United Kingdom) David Senior	(South Korea) Hyundai Castrol World Rally Team	Hyundai Accent WRC2	3:47:25.3	+6:30.6	0
Retired SS14		9	(Italy) Piero Liatti	(Italy) Carlo Cassina	(South Korea) Hyundai Castrol World Rally Team	Hyundai Accent WRC2	Brakes		0
Retired SS7		11	(Germany) Armin Schwarz	(Germany) Manfred Hiemer	(Czech Republic) Škoda Motorsport	Škoda Octavia WRC Evo2	Steering		0
Retired SS6		4	(United Kingdom) Colin McRae	(United Kingdom) Nicky Grist	(United Kingdom) Ford Motor Co. Ltd.	Ford Focus RS WRC '01	Fuel pump		0
Retired SS3		6	(Norway) Petter Solberg	(United Kingdom) Phil Mills	(Japan) Subaru World Rally Team	Subaru Impreza S7 WRC '01	Accident		0

==== Special stages ====
Day	Stage	Stage name	Length	Winner	Car	Time	Class leaders
Leg 1 (23 Mar)	SS1	La Trona 1	12.90 km	(Spain) Jesús Puras	Citroën Xsara WRC	8:24.8	(Spain) Jesús Puras
Leg 1 (23 Mar)	SS2	Alpens — Les Llosses 1	21.80 km	(Finland) Tommi Mäkinen	Mitsubishi Lancer Evo 6.5	13:30.3	(Spain) Jesús Puras
Leg 1 (23 Mar)	SS3	Vallfogona 1	15.80 km	(France) Philippe Bugalski	Citroën Xsara WRC	9:21.2	(Spain) Jesús Puras
Leg 1 (23 Mar)	SS4	La Trona 2	12.90 km	(France) Didier Auriol	Peugeot 206 WRC	8:26.2	(Spain) Jesús Puras
Leg 1 (23 Mar)	SS5	Alpens — Les Llosses 2	21.80 km	(France) Philippe Bugalski	Citroën Xsara WRC	13:32.7	(Spain) Jesús Puras
Leg 1 (23 Mar)	SS6	Vallfogona 2	15.80 km	(France) Philippe Bugalski	Citroën Xsara WRC	9:19.3	(Spain) Jesús Puras
Leg 2 (24 Mar)	SS7	Pratdip 1	31.57 km	(Spain) Jesús Puras	Citroën Xsara WRC	19:12.0	(Spain) Jesús Puras
Leg 2 (24 Mar)	SS8	Escaladei 1	14.43 km	(France) Philippe Bugalski	Citroën Xsara WRC	10:26.6	(Spain) Jesús Puras
Leg 2 (24 Mar)	SS9	La Riba 1	35.89 km	(France) Philippe Bugalski	Citroën Xsara WRC	21:56.6	(France) Philippe Bugalski
Leg 2 (24 Mar)	SS10	Pratdip 2	31.57 km	(France) Philippe Bugalski	Citroën Xsara WRC	19:17.8	(France) Philippe Bugalski
Leg 2 (24 Mar)	SS11	Escaladei 2	14.43 km	(France) Didier Auriol	Peugeot 206 WRC	10:44.5	(France) Philippe Bugalski
Leg 2 (24 Mar)	SS12	La Riba 2	35.89 km	Stage cancelled			(France) Philippe Bugalski
Leg 3 (25 Mar)	SS13	Coll de Bracons 1	19.66 km	(France) Gilles Panizzi	Peugeot 206 WRC	12:51.3	(France) Philippe Bugalski
Leg 3 (25 Mar)	SS14	Osor 1	13.26 km	(France) Didier Auriol	Peugeot 206 WRC	8:12.4	(France) Philippe Bugalski
Leg 3 (25 Mar)	SS15	Collsesplanes 1	26.28 km	(France) Philippe Bugalski	Citroën Xsara WRC	16:28.0	(France) Didier Auriol
Leg 3 (25 Mar)	SS16	Coll de Bracons 2	19.66 km	(France) Didier Auriol	Peugeot 206 WRC	12:56.1	(France) Didier Auriol
Leg 3 (25 Mar)	SS17	Osor 2	13.26 km	(France) Gilles Panizzi	Peugeot 206 WRC	8:10.9	(France) Didier Auriol
Leg 3 (25 Mar)	SS18	Collsesplanes 2	26.28 km	(France) Philippe Bugalski	Citroën Xsara WRC	16:33.3	(France) Didier Auriol

==== Championship standings ====
Pos.	Drivers' championships			Co-drivers' championships			Manufacturers' championships		
Pos.	Move	Driver	Points	Move	Co-driver	Points	Move	Manufacturer	Points
1		(Finland) Tommi Mäkinen	24		(Finland) Risto Mannisenmäki	24		(Japan) Marlboro Mitsubishi Ralliart	40
2		(Spain) Carlos Sainz	18		(Spain) Luis Moya	18		(United Kingdom) Ford Motor Co. Ltd.	22
3	New entry	(France) Didier Auriol	10	New entry	(France) Denis Giraudet	10	3	(France) Peugeot Total	20
4	1	(Finland) Harri Rovanperä	10	1	(Finland) Risto Pietiläinen	10		(Japan) Subaru World Rally Team	8
5	1	(France) François Delecour	9	1	(France) Daniel Grataloup	9	2	(South Korea) Hyundai Castrol World Rally Team	8

=== FIA Cup for Production Rally Drivers ===
==== Classification ====
Position		No.	Driver	Co-driver	Entrant	Car	Time	Difference	Points
Event	Class	No.	Driver	Co-driver	Entrant	Car	Time	Difference	Points
18	1	27	(Argentina) Gabriel Pozzo	(Argentina) Daniel Stillo	(Argentina) Gabriel Pozzo	Mitsubishi Lancer Evo VI	4:04:36.1		10
19	2	83	(Lebanon) Roger Feghali	(Italy) Nicola Arena	(France) Mistral Racing	Mitsubishi Lancer Evo VI	4:06:23.3	+1:47.2	6
21	3	28	(Sweden) Stig Blomqvist	(Venezuela) Ana Goñi	(United Kingdom) David Sutton Cars Ltd	Mitsubishi Lancer Evo VI	4:07:13.5	+2:37.4	4
23	4	88	(Russia) Stanislav Gryazin	(Russia) Dmitriy Eremeev	(Russia) Stanislav Gryazin	Mitsubishi Lancer Evo VI	4:07:54.4	+3:18.3	3
27	5	85	(Spain) Joan Font	(Spain) Manel Muñoz	(Spain) Escudería Voltregá	Mitsubishi Lancer Evo VI	4:09:40.8	+5:04.7	2
28	6	98	(France) Eddie Mercier	(France) Jean-Michel Veret	(France) Eddie Mercier	Renault Clio RS	4:11:59.2	+7:23.1	1
29	7	82	(Belgium) Bob Colsoul	(Belgium) Tom Colsoul	(Belgium) Bob Colsoul	Mitsubishi Lancer Evo VI	4:16:54.6	+12:18.5	0
30	8	91	(Portugal) Paulo Freire	(Portugal) Jorge Manuel Carvalho	(Portugal) Paulo Freire	Mitsubishi Lancer Evo VI	4:18:23.7	+13:47.6	0
31	9	86	(Poland) Paweł Dytko	(Poland) Tomasz Dytko	(Poland) Paweł Dytko	Mitsubishi Lancer Evo VI	4:18:35.6	+13:59.5	0
32	10	84	(Italy) Fabio Frisiero	(Italy) Simone Scattolin	(Italy) Fabio Frisiero	Mitsubishi Lancer Evo VI	4:23:18.2	+18:42.1	0
34	11	89	(United Kingdom) Natalie Barratt	(Australia) Claire Parker	(United Kingdom) Natalie Barratt Rallysport	Mitsubishi Lancer Evo V	4:27:10.0	+22:33.9	0
35	12	101	(Belgium) Michel Wilders	(Belgium) Danielle Wilders-Arend	(Belgium) Royal Racing Car Mosan	Honda Civic VTi	4:37:20.1	+32:44.0	0
36	13	100	(Spain) Josep Fornell Argany	(Spain) Xavier Avellan	(Spain) Gamace MC Competición	Peugeot 106 Rallye	4:53:04.6	+48:28.5	0
Retired SS15		26	(Uruguay) Gustavo Trelles	(Argentina) Jorge Del Buono	(Uruguay) Gustavo Trelles	Mitsubishi Lancer Evo VI	Mechanical		0
Retired SS11		29	(Argentina) Marcos Ligato	(Argentina) Rubén García	(Argentina) Marcos Ligato	Mitsubishi Lancer Evo VI	Accident		0
Retired SS10		96	(Italy) Elvio Corradin	(Italy) Diego Nervo	(Italy) Elvio Corradin	Peugeot 306 S16	Mechanical		0
Retired SS10		102	(Spain) Edgar Llebaria	(Spain) Óscar Sánchez	(Spain) Gamace MC Competición	Peugeot 106 Rallye	Accident		0
Retired SS3		97	(Luxembourg) Eric Degrotte	(Belgium) Philippe Robyns	(Luxembourg) Eric Degrotte	Honda Integra Type-R	Mechanical		0
Retired SS2		87	(Italy) Angelo Proietti	(Italy) Piero Di Francesco	(Italy) Angelo Proietti	Mitsubishi Lancer Evo VI	Mechanical		0
Retired SS2		99	(United Kingdom) Ernie Graham	(United Kingdom) Robin Hernaman	(United Kingdom) Ernie Graham	Peugeot 306 S16	Mechanical		0
Retired SS1		95	(France) Jean-Yves Requin	(France) Carole Meslin	(France) Jean-Yves Requin	Peugeot 306 S16	Accident		0

==== Special stages ====
Day	Stage	Stage name	Length	Winner	Car	Time	Class leaders
Leg 1 (23 Mar)	SS1	La Trona 1	12.90 km	(Uruguay) Gustavo Trelles	Mitsubishi Lancer Evo VI	9:05.6	(Uruguay) Gustavo Trelles
Leg 1 (23 Mar)	SS2	Alpens — Les Llosses 1	21.80 km	(Argentina) Marcos Ligato	Mitsubishi Lancer Evo VI	14:46.1	(Uruguay) Gustavo Trelles
Leg 1 (23 Mar)	SS3	Vallfogona 1	15.80 km	(Argentina) Marcos Ligato	Mitsubishi Lancer Evo VI	10:15.0	(Uruguay) Gustavo Trelles
Leg 1 (23 Mar)	SS4	La Trona 2	12.90 km	(Uruguay) Gustavo Trelles	Mitsubishi Lancer Evo VI	9:07.9	(Uruguay) Gustavo Trelles
Leg 1 (23 Mar)	SS5	Alpens — Les Llosses 2	21.80 km	(Argentina) Marcos Ligato	Mitsubishi Lancer Evo VI	14:45.3	(Argentina) Marcos Ligato
Leg 1 (23 Mar)	SS6	Vallfogona 2	15.80 km	(Argentina) Marcos Ligato	Mitsubishi Lancer Evo VI	10:12.6	(Argentina) Marcos Ligato
Leg 2 (24 Mar)	SS7	Pratdip 1	31.57 km	(Argentina) Gabriel Pozzo	Mitsubishi Lancer Evo VI	21:01.2	(Uruguay) Gustavo Trelles
Leg 2 (24 Mar)	SS8	Escaladei 1	14.43 km	(Argentina) Marcos Ligato	Mitsubishi Lancer Evo VI	11:20.1	(Argentina) Marcos Ligato
Leg 2 (24 Mar)	SS9	La Riba 1	35.89 km	(Uruguay) Gustavo Trelles	Mitsubishi Lancer Evo VI	24:10.4	(Uruguay) Gustavo Trelles
Leg 2 (24 Mar)	SS10	Pratdip 2	31.57 km	(Argentina) Gabriel Pozzo	Mitsubishi Lancer Evo VI	20:56.1	(Uruguay) Gustavo Trelles
Leg 2 (24 Mar)	SS11	Escaladei 2	14.43 km	(Uruguay) Gustavo Trelles	Mitsubishi Lancer Evo VI	11:36.5	(Uruguay) Gustavo Trelles
Leg 2 (24 Mar)	SS12	La Riba 2	35.89 km	Stage cancelled			(Uruguay) Gustavo Trelles
Leg 3 (25 Mar)	SS13	Coll de Bracons 1	19.66 km	(Uruguay) Gustavo Trelles	Mitsubishi Lancer Evo VI	14:18.3	(Uruguay) Gustavo Trelles
Leg 3 (25 Mar)	SS14	Osor 1	13.26 km	(Argentina) Gabriel Pozzo	Mitsubishi Lancer Evo VI	9:07.6	(Uruguay) Gustavo Trelles
Leg 3 (25 Mar)	SS15	Collsesplanes 1	26.28 km	(Lebanon) Roger Feghali	Mitsubishi Lancer Evo VI	18:17.6	(Argentina) Gabriel Pozzo
Leg 3 (25 Mar)	SS16	Coll de Bracons 2	19.66 km	(Argentina) Gabriel Pozzo	Mitsubishi Lancer Evo VI	14:12.1	(Argentina) Gabriel Pozzo
Leg 3 (25 Mar)	SS17	Osor 2	13.26 km	Notional stage time			(Argentina) Gabriel Pozzo
Leg 3 (25 Mar)	SS18	Collsesplanes 2	26.28 km	(Argentina) Gabriel Pozzo	Mitsubishi Lancer Evo VI	18:24.7	(Argentina) Gabriel Pozzo

==== Championship standings ====
Pos.	Drivers' championships		
Pos.	Move	Driver	Points
1	9	(Argentina) Gabriel Pozzo	13
2	1	(Switzerland) Olivier Gillet	10
3	1	(Sweden) Stig-Olov Walfridsson	10
4	1	(Portugal) Pedro Dias da Silva	10
5	3	(Sweden) Stig Blomqvist	8

=== FIA Cup for Super 1600 Drivers ===
==== Classification ====
Position		No.	Driver	Co-driver	Entrant	Car	Time	Difference	Points
Event	Class	No.	Driver	Co-driver	Entrant	Car	Time	Difference	Points
15	1	53	(France) Sébastien Loeb	(Monaco) Daniel Elena	(France) Citroën Sport	Citroën Saxo S1600	4:00:18.6		10
16	2	56	(Italy) Giandomenico Basso	(Italy) Flavio Guglielmini	(Italy) Top Run SRL	Fiat Punto S1600	4:03:09.3	+2:50.7	6
20	3	61	(Italy) Corrado Fontana	(Italy) Renzo Casazza	(Italy) H.F. Grifone SRL	Peugeot 206 S1600	4:06:29.8	+6:11.2	4
22	4	63	(Norway) Martin Stenshorne	(United Kingdom) Clive Jenkins	(Norway) Zeta Racing	Ford Puma S1600	4:07:24.3	+7:05.7	3
24	5	52	(Italy) Andrea Dallavilla	(Italy) Danilo Fappani	(Italy) R&D Motorsport	Fiat Punto S1600	4:08:27.8	+8:09.2	2
25	6	73	(Italy) Christian Chemin	(Italy) Matteo Alberto Bacchin	(Italy) Hawk Racing Club	Fiat Punto S1600	4:09:03.0	+8:44.4	1
26	7	57	(France) Cédric Robert	(France) Marie-Pierre Billoux	(France) Team Gamma	Peugeot 206 S1600	4:09:06.3	+8:47.7	0
Retired SS15		68	(Italy) Massimo Ceccato	(Italy) Mitia Dotta	(Italy) Hawk Racing Club	Fiat Punto S1600	Accident		0
Retired SS11		58	(Spain) Sergio Vallejo	(Spain) Diego Vallejo	(Spain) Pronto Racing	Fiat Punto S1600	Excluded		0
Retired SS11		59	(France) Benoît Rousselot	(France) Gilles Mondésir	(United Kingdom) Ford Motor Co. Ltd.	Ford Puma S1600	Engine		0
Retired SS10		51	(France) Patrick Magaud	(France) Guylène Brun	(United Kingdom) Ford Motor Co. Ltd.	Ford Puma S1600	Engine		0
Retired SS10		71	(Belgium) François Duval	(Belgium) Jean-Marc Fortin	(United Kingdom) Ford Motor Co. Ltd.	Ford Puma S1600	Accident		0
Retired SS9		50	(Austria) Manfred Stohl	(Austria) Ilka Minor	(Italy) Top Run SRL	Fiat Punto S1600	Suspension		0
Retired SS9		72	(Malaysia) Saladin Mazlan	(United Kingdom) Timothy Sturla	(Malaysia) Saladin Rallying	Ford Puma S1600	Accident		0
Retired SS7		54	(Belgium) Larry Cols	(Belgium) Yasmine Gerard	(Belgium) Peugeot Bastos Racing	Peugeot 206 S1600	Transmission		0
Retired SS7		65	(Paraguay) Alejandro Galanti	(Uruguay) Daniel Muzio	(Italy) Astra Racing	Ford Puma S1600	Engine		0
Retired SS7		69	(France) Nicolas Bernardi	(France) Delphine Bernardi	(France) Team Gamma	Peugeot 206 S1600	Mechanical		0
Retired SS6		55	(United Kingdom) Niall McShea	(United Kingdom) Michael Orr	(United Kingdom) Ford Motor Co. Ltd.	Ford Puma S1600	Retired		0
Retired SS6		60	(Switzerland) Cyril Henny	(Switzerland) Aurore Brand	(Switzerland) Rally Team Henny	Citroën Saxo S1600	Ignition		0
Retired SS3		62	(Finland) Jussi Välimäki	(Finland) Jakke Honkanen	(Finland) ST Motors	Peugeot 206 S1600	Accident		0
Retired SS3		64	(Italy) Massimo Macaluso	(Italy) Antonio Celot	(Italy) R&D Motorsport	Fiat Punto S1600	Accident		0
Retired SS2		67	(Andorra) Albert Llovera	(Spain) Marc Corral	(Spain) Pronto Racing	Fiat Punto S1600	Accident		0

==== Special stages ====
Day	Stage	Stage name	Length	Winner	Car	Time	Class leaders
Leg 1 (23 Mar)	SS1	La Trona 1	12.90 km	(France) Cédric Robert	Peugeot 206 S1600	9:06.1	(France) Cédric Robert
Leg 1 (23 Mar)	SS2	Alpens — Les Llosses 1	21.80 km	(France) Sébastien Loeb	Citroën Saxo S1600	14:37.6	(France) Sébastien Loeb
Leg 1 (23 Mar)	SS3	Vallfogona 1	15.80 km	(France) Sébastien Loeb	Citroën Saxo S1600	10:04.1	(France) Sébastien Loeb
Leg 1 (23 Mar)	SS4	La Trona 2	12.90 km	(Belgium) François Duval	Ford Puma S1600	9:05.2	(Belgium) François Duval
Leg 1 (23 Mar)	SS5	Alpens — Les Llosses 2	21.80 km	(United Kingdom) Niall McShea	Ford Puma S1600	14:45.3	(France) Sébastien Loeb
Leg 1 (23 Mar)	SS6	Vallfogona 2	15.80 km	(France) Sébastien Loeb	Citroën Saxo S1600	10:07.0	(France) Sébastien Loeb
Leg 2 (24 Mar)	SS7	Pratdip 1	31.57 km	(Austria) Manfred Stohl	Fiat Punto S1600	21:01.2	(Italy) Giandomenico Basso
Leg 2 (24 Mar)	SS8	Escaladei 1	14.43 km	(France) Sébastien Loeb	Citroën Saxo S1600	11:10.5	(Spain) Sergio Vallejo
Leg 2 (24 Mar)	SS9	La Riba 1	35.89 km	(France) Sébastien Loeb	Citroën Saxo S1600	23:38.6	(Spain) Sergio Vallejo
Leg 2 (24 Mar)	SS10	Pratdip 2	31.57 km	(France) Sébastien Loeb	Citroën Saxo S1600	20:48.5	(France) Sébastien Loeb
Leg 2 (24 Mar)	SS11	Escaladei 2	14.43 km	(France) Sébastien Loeb	Citroën Saxo S1600	11:32.3	(France) Sébastien Loeb
Leg 2 (24 Mar)	SS12	La Riba 2	35.89 km	Stage cancelled			(France) Sébastien Loeb
Leg 3 (25 Mar)	SS13	Coll de Bracons 1	19.66 km	(France) Sébastien Loeb	Citroën Saxo S1600	14:01.0	(France) Sébastien Loeb
Leg 3 (25 Mar)	SS14	Osor 1	13.26 km	(France) Sébastien Loeb	Citroën Saxo S1600	8:57.3	(France) Sébastien Loeb
Leg 3 (25 Mar)	SS15	Collsesplanes 1	26.28 km	(France) Sébastien Loeb	Citroën Saxo S1600	18:02.0	(France) Sébastien Loeb
Leg 3 (25 Mar)	SS16	Coll de Bracons 2	19.66 km	(France) Cédric Robert	Peugeot 206 S1600	14:08.9	(France) Sébastien Loeb
Leg 3 (25 Mar)	SS17	Osor 2	13.26 km	Notional stage time			(France) Sébastien Loeb
Leg 3 (25 Mar)	SS18	Collsesplanes 2	26.28 km	(France) Cédric Robert	Peugeot 206 S1600	18:21.4	(France) Sébastien Loeb

==== Championship standings ====
Pos.	Drivers' championships		
Pos.	Move	Driver	Points
1	New entry	(France) Sébastien Loeb	10
2	New entry	(Italy) Giandomenico Basso	6
3	New entry	(Italy) Corrado Fontana	4
4	New entry	(Norway) Martin Stenshorne	3
5	New entry	(Italy) Andrea Dallavilla	2
