= Nidec ASI =

Italian multinational company

Nidec Industrial Solutions
- Company type: Public
- Industry: Power Generation Electrical equipment
- Founded: 2013
- Headquarters: Viale Sarca, 336, I - 20126 Milano, Italy
- Key people: Dominique Llonch (CEO)
- Products: Medium Voltage electric motors and generators; Low and Medium voltage drives; power electronics for Power Supply and Power Quality; Industrial control and automation systems
- Number of employees: 1300 (2015)
- Website: Official website

Nidec Industrial Solutions is an Italian multinational company based in Milan, that designs and manufactures rotating electrical machines, Power electronics and industrial automation. It was founded in 2012 with the acquisition of Ansaldo Sistemi Industriali by Nidec Corporation. Working in electrical engineering, designs and manufactures of electric motors and generators, power electronics and control systems and automation for industrial applications, Nidec Industrial Solutions was founded in 2012 when Nidec, a Japanese multinational corporation listed on the TYO: 6594 and NYSE: NJ, NJ and ON TOPIX 100 Component and Nikkei, acquired Ansaldo Sistemi Industriali (ASI). ASI, an industrial branch of the Ansaldo Group, was privatized in 2000. Its markets include petrochemical, energy, steel, marine and industrial automation.

Nidec Industrial Solutions (formerly Ansaldo Sistemi Industriali) as a former Finmeccanica company, shares its history and its roots with the history of Italian company Ansaldo, founded in 1853 in Sampierdarena (Genoa district), then merged in 1993 in the Finmeccanica group.

== History ==
- 1853: Foundation of Gio Ansaldo & Co. in Genoa. Over the years the company develops in three business areas: transport, energy, industry.
- 1899: Ansaldo inaugurates its electrical plant in Genoa, from which derives the Ansaldo Sistemi Industriali.
- 1950: Ansaldo become a partially State-owned enterprise.
- 1989-1995: A period of great expansion for the industrial division of Ansaldo: the acquisition of Hill Graham Controls (UK), Ross Hill Controls (US) & Loire Automation.
- 2000: Ansaldo Sistemi Industriali (ASI), the industrial division of Ansaldo, is privatized and began collaborating with Robicon (USA) under the name ASIRobicon. Ansaldo Sistemi Industriali changes its name in ASIRobicon SpA.
- 2005: ASI ends collaboration with Robicon and the company became "a Lynn Tilton Company."
- 2006: ASIRobicon SpA becomes Ansaldo Sistemi Industriali SpA.
- 2012: Ansaldo Sistemi Industriali SpA becomes part of Nidec Corporation and becomes Nidec ASI SpA
- 2013: Nidec acquires Ansaldo Sistemi Industriali S.p.A. and becomes Nidec ASI S.p.A. Giovanni Barra, initially assumes the position of Chief Operating Officer of Nidec ASI S.p.A. and in 2014 is appointed CEO.
- 2017-2018: Nidec acquires from Emerson, the Leroy Somer motors and generators as well as the Control Technique drives and solutions activities. The solutions activities are merged with Nidec ASI under the Nidec Industrial Solutions umbrella. Dominique Llonch becomes President of Nidec Industrial Solutions and CEO of Nidec ASI S.p.A.

== Markets ==
Nidec ASI operates in the following markets:

- Oil & Gas,
- Steel,
- Energy,
- Marine
- Heavy industry such as material handling, rubber, mining, cement, and cable systems.

== Products ==
Nidec Industrial Solutions manufactures a complete electrical package including medium voltage electric motors and generators, Low and Medium voltage drives, power electronics for power supply and power quality and develops control and automation systems with proprietary platform.

== Skills and significant projects ==
- Energy – Nuclear fusion for Japan Atomic Energy Agency
- Energy – Smart microgrid, Ollegue, Chile
- Marine – Retrofitting of military ship Amerigo Vespucci
- Marine – Electrical ship Liuto, ZEB
- Power Supply – Ship to Shore Harbour of Livorno
- Metals – Yichang Cold Rolling Mill

== Geographical Presence ==
Nidec ASI, headquartered in Milan in Italy, is present with subsidiaries in France, Germany, Romania, Russia, China, Japan and United States.

== History of production sites ==
- Monfalcone - production of electrical rotating machines: born within the Trieste shipyard as Officine Elettromeccaniche Triestine (OET), the factory was moved to the present site in 1960. The site of Monfalcone can manage the production of large rotating machines.
- Milan - production of power electronics: the Milan site dates back to 1899 when Electrotechnical Group Ansaldo factory was founded. "The electricism - it is written in the pamphlet announces the birth of the factory - is the main industry of the future." The Milan site is dedicated to the manufacture of medium voltage converter, excitation systems and power quality systems.
- Montebello - production of Low Voltage drives, industrial control and automation systems: the site of Montebello is specialized in the production of low voltage inverter and the production of electrical panels for automation and renewable energy market. The website also presents a functional prototype of a micro smart grid (energy micro grid) connected to a system of solar panels and energy storage.
- Genoa - production of automation systems: the site of Genoa is the historic core of Nidec ASI SpA. The site is specialized in the design and commissioning of automation systems for steel plants as well as in the design of systems power quality and power supply.
- Ohio - Manufactures Avtron Encoders

== See also ==
- Ansaldo
- Finmeccanica
- List of Italian companies
- Nidec
