= Embraco =

Brazilian manufacturer of compressors for refrigeration systems

- Industry: Manufacturing
- Founded: 1971
- Headquarters: Joinville, Santa Catarina, Brazil
- Products: Refrigeration compressors and condensing units
- Number of employees: 10,000+
- Parent: Nidec Corporation
- Website: www.embraco.com

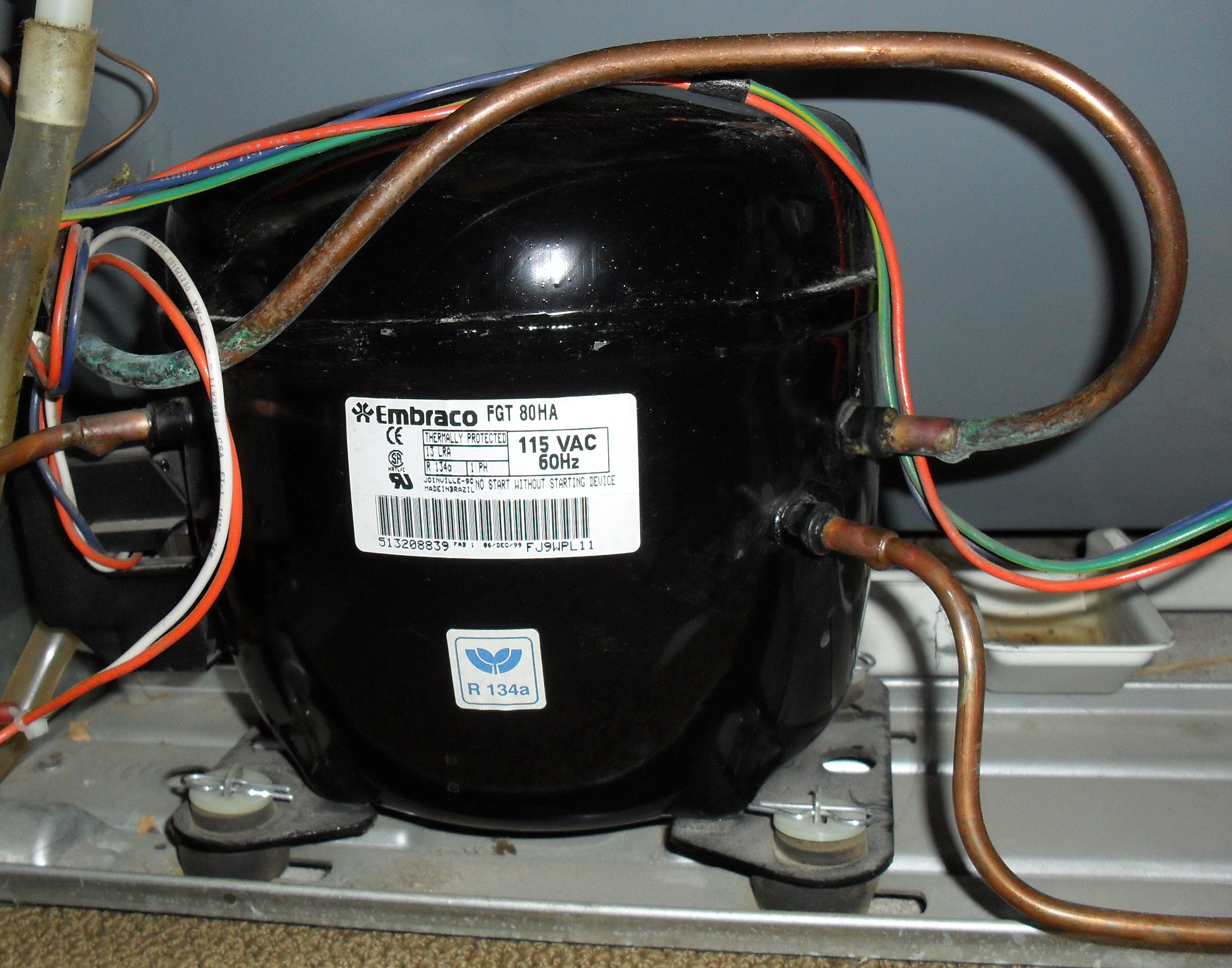
A Brazilian-made Embraco compressor fitted in a domestic refrigerator

Embraco is a manufacturer of compressors for refrigeration systems that was founded in 1971 in Brazil. Embraco produces hermetic compressors, condensing units, and sealed units, for domestic and commercial use.

Its headquarters and main factory is in Joinville, Santa Catarina in the southern region of Brazil. Embraco also has factories in China, Mexico and Slovakia, as well as business offices in Turin (Italy), Moscow (Russia) and Atlanta (United States).

Embraco employs approximately 10,000 people worldwide. The firm invests heavily in product design and manufacturing, and supplies large international household refrigeration OEMs as well as the biggest manufacturers of commercial refrigeration equipment.

== History ==
Embraco was founded in Joinville, in the Southern region of Brazil, in 1971. It was founded to supply the Brazilian refrigeration industry which, until then, relied entirely on imported compressors. A few years after its inauguration it began to export to other countries in the Americas.

In the 1980s, the sales and distribution structure reached over 80 countries. Anticipating a globalized economy, the company decided to set up production bases overseas.

In 2014, Embraco announced linear compressors which were claimed to be more compact than other compressors and to be oil-free.

In 2018, Embraco closed its factory in Turin and moved it to Slovakia, albeit leaving a business office in Turin.

In April 2018, Whirlpool Corporation entered into an agreement with Nidec Corporation to sell Embraco for $1.08 billion. Headquartered in Brazil, Embraco had been a Whirlpool Corporation business unit since 1997.
