= Nidec =

Japanese electric motor company

Nidec Corporation

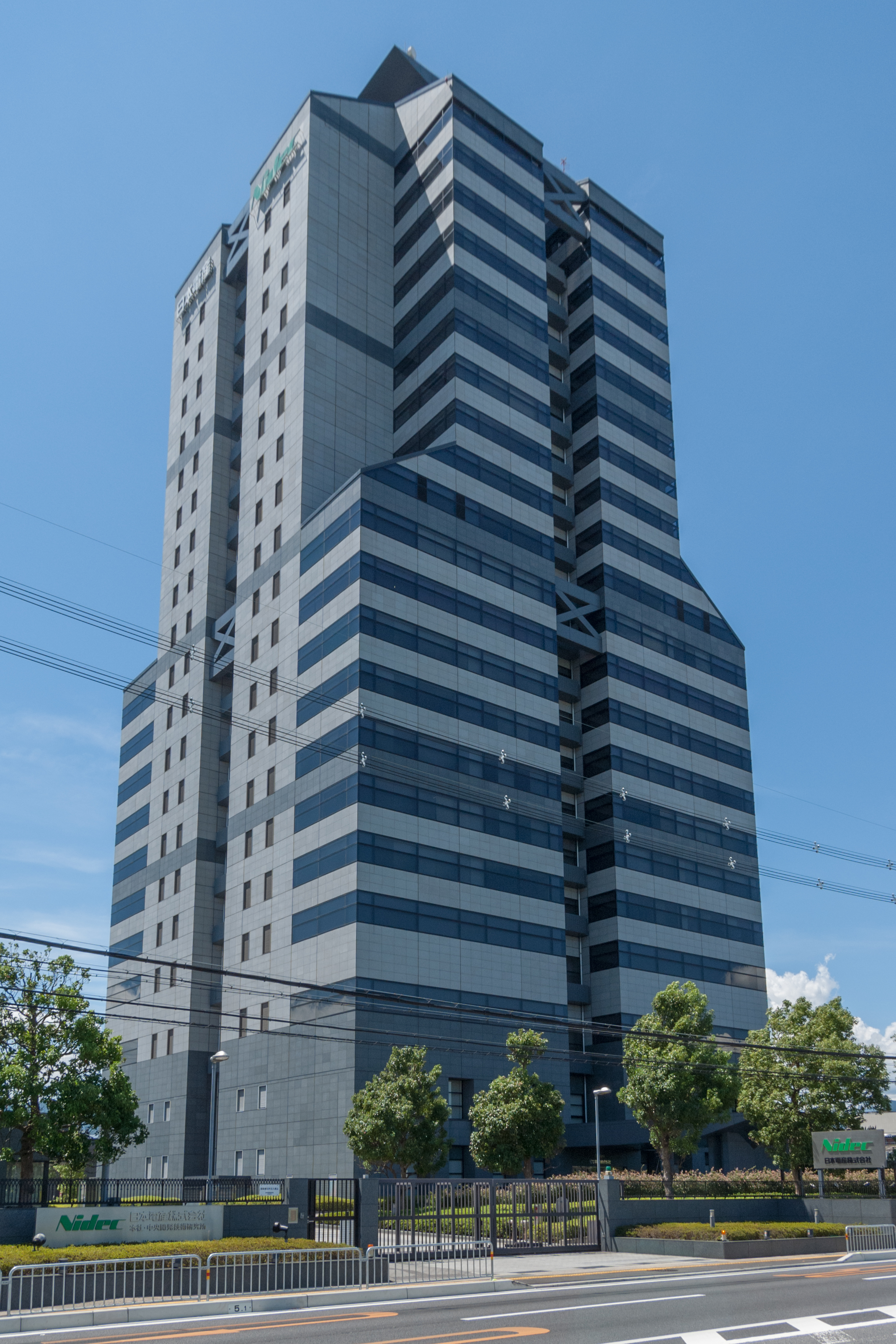
- Company headquarters and Central Technical Laboratory
- Native name: ニデック株式会社
- Romanized name: Nidec kabushiki gaisha
- Formerly: Nippon Densan Corporation (1973-2023)
- Type: Public KK
- Traded as: TYO: 6594; TOPIX 100 Component
- Industry: Electronic components
- Founded: July 23, 1973; 53 years ago
- Headquarters: 338 Kuzetonoshiro-cho, Minami-ku, Kyoto, Japan
- Key people: Shigenobu Nagamori (CEO)
- Products: Small precision motors; Automotive motors; Home appliance motors; Commercial and industrial motors; Motors for machinery; Electronic and optical components
- Revenue: ▲US$11.15 billion (FY 2017) (JPY 1199.3 billion) (FY 2017)
- Net income: ▲US$1.04 billion (FY 2017) (JPY 111.7 billion) (FY 2017)
- Number of employees: Nidec Corporation: 2,392 (as of March 31, 2017) Consolidated: 107,062 (as of March 31, 2017)
- Website: Official website

Nidec Corporation (ニデック株式会社, Nidekku Kabushiki gaisha), formerly known as Nippon Densan Corporation (日本電産株式会社, Nihon Densan Kabushiki gaisha), is a Japanese manufacturer and distributor of electric motors. Its products are found in hard-disk drives, electric appliances, automobiles and commercial and manufacturing equipment. The company is the global market leader for the spindle motors that power hard-disk drives.

The two largest product groups are hard-disk drive motors and automotive products with 16% and 22% of sales, respectively.

As of 2017, the company has 296 subsidiaries companies located across Japan, Asia, Europe and the Americas. Nidec is listed on the first section of the Tokyo Stock Exchange and is a constituent of the TOPIX 100 stock market index.

The company was number 42 on the 2005 edition of the Businessweek Infotech 100 list. Also Nidec was featured on the 2014 Forbes World's Most Innovative Companies list.

== History ==
| Year | Month | Major Events |
|---|---|---|
| 1973 | July | Shigenobu Nagamori, current chairman of the board, president and CEO, established Nippon Densan Corporation (now Nidec Corporation) in Nishikyo-ku, Kyoto with a capital of 20 million yen. |
| 1974 | October | Opened a sales agent in the U.S. Relocated its head office to Omiya, Nakagyo-ku, Kyoto. |
| 1975 | April | Launched full-scale production of brushless DC motors. |
| 1976 | April | Established Nidec America Corp, a locally incorporated company. |
| 1979 | October | Started production of spindle motors for 8-inch hard disk device. |
| 1984 | February | Acquired the axial-flow fan business from American company Torin Corporation, and established the locally incorporated company Nidec Torin Corporation in America. Started production of spindle motors for 3.5-inch hard disk device. |
| 1988 | October | The company listed its stock on the second section of the Osaka Stock Exchange, and the Kyoto Stock Exchange. |
| 1990 | August | Established Nidec Electronics (Thailand) Co., Ltd., a locally incorporated company. |
| 1992 | February | Established Nidec (Dalian) Ltd., a locally incorporated company in China. |
| 1993 | April | Established Nidec Electronics GmbH, a locally incorporated company in Germany. |
| 1995 | December | Established Nidec Philippines Corp., a locally incorporated company. |
| 1997 | December | Established Nidec Tosok (Vietnam) Co., Ltd. through a joint investment with Tosok Corp. |
| 1998 | February | Established P.T. Nidec Indonesia, a locally incorporated company.[Sep]Listed on the first section of the Tokyo Stock Exchange. Listed on the first section of the Osaka Stock Exchange. |
| 1999 | December | Established Nidec Korea Corp., a locally incorporated company. |
| 2001 | September | Listed on the New York Stock Exchange. |
| 2003 | March | The building for the Head Office and Central Technical Laboratory was completed in Minami-ku, Kyoto |
| 2006 | December | Established Nidec Motors & Actuators by acquiring the motor and actuator business of Valeo S.A., a French company. |
| 2010 | January | Nidec Techno Motor Holdings Corporation acquired the home appliance motor business of Appliances Components, an Italian home appliance manufacturer. Started Nidec Sole Motor Corporation S.R.L.[Dec]Established Nidec India Private Limited as its sales subsidiary in India. |
| 2012 | March | Established SC Wado Component (Cambodia) Co., Ltd. as the first operating base in Cambodia. |
| 2023 | April | Company name changed to Nidec Kabushiki gaisha |

== Nidec acquisitions ==
- Nidec ASI. In 2012 Nidec acquired Ansaldo Sistemi Industriali S.p.A. which became Nidec ASI. Since 2012 Nidec ASI has been involved in comprehensive drive technology. As a part of the Nidec Group, the core business of Nidec ASI S.p.A. includes energy, marine, metals, oil & Gas and general industry (cement, water treatment, rubber and plastic, materials handling, glass, ceramics, paper and ropeway). Since 2014, Giovanni Barra has been CEO of Nidec ASI
- Nidec Leroy-Somer. On January 31, 2017, Nidec acquired Leroy-Somer from Emerson Electric which became Nidec Leroy-Somer Holding.
- Nidec Global Appliance Compressors GmbH. On July 31, 2017, Nidec acquired Secop GmbH, a German hermetic compressor manufacturer from Aurelius Equity Group, expanding further into the refrigeration market. Since April 28, 2018, Nidec has entered into an agreement with Whirlpool Corporation to acquire the refrigeration compressor business of Embraco. In response to antitrust concerns, in 2019 Nidec sold Secop.
- In November 2018, Nidec became a shareholder of Nidec Chaun-Choung Technology Corporation, a long-established cooling company in Taiwan. In December 2019, it again announced that it would increase its shareholding from 49.01% to 53.48%, and reached 67% shareholding in December 2020.
