= Peugeot 106 =

City car

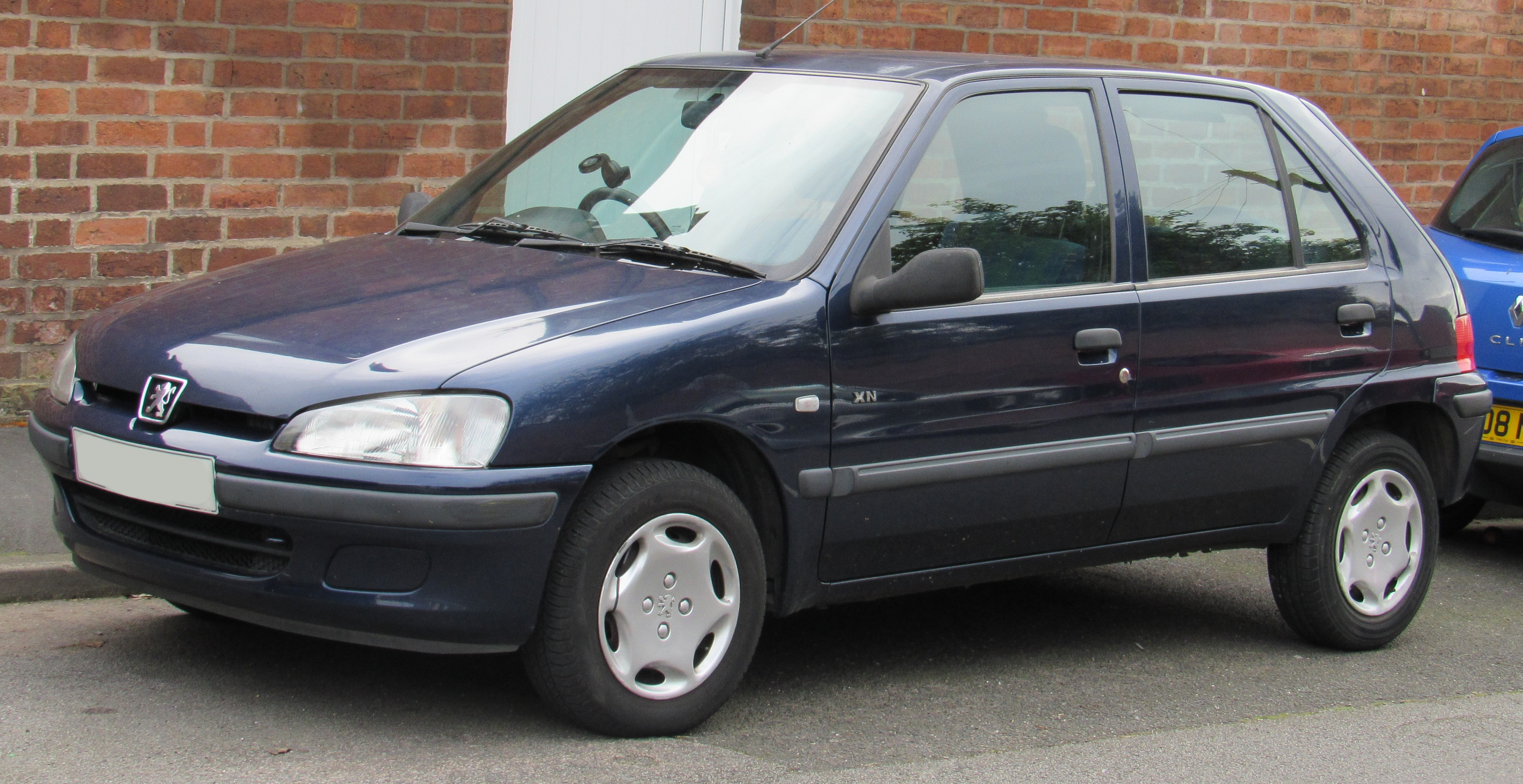
- 2001 Peugeot 106 XN (Phase II)

Overview
- Manufacturer: Peugeot
- Production: 1991–2003 (2,798,200 units)
- Assembly: Mulhouse, France; Aulnay-sous-Bois, France; La Marsa, Tunisia (STAFIM)
- Designer: Laurent Rossi under Philippe Couvreur (exterior); Paul Bracq (interior)

Body and chassis
- Class: Supermini (B)
- Body style: 3/5-door hatchback
- Layout: Front-engine, front-wheel-drive
- Related: Peugeot 205; Peugeot 306

Powertrain
- Engine: Petrol: 954 cc TU9 I4; 1124 cc TU1 I4; 1294 cc TU2 I4; 1360 cc TU3 I4; 1587 cc TU5 I4; Diesel: 1360 cc TUD3 I4; 1527 cc TUD5 I4
- Electric motor: 11 kW/15 hp (electric)

Dimensions
- Wheelbase: Phase I: 2,385 mm (93.9 in); Phase II: 2,387 mm (94.0 in)
- Length: Phase I: 3,564 mm (140.3 in); Phase II: 3,678 mm (144.8 in)
- Width: Phase I: 1,590 mm (62.6 in); Phase II: 1,594 mm (62.8 in); GTI: 1,610 mm (63.4 in)
- Height: Phase I: 1,369 mm (53.9 in); Phase II: 1,380 mm (54.3 in); GTI: 1,357 mm (53.4 in)
- Curb weight: 790–950 kg (1,741.7–2,094.4 lb)

Chronology
- Predecessor: Peugeot 104
- Successor: Peugeot 107

The Peugeot 106 is a supermini car produced by French automaker Peugeot Talbot between 1991 and 2003. Launched in September 1991, it was Peugeot's entry level offering throughout its production life, and was initially sold only as a three-door hatchback, with a five-door hatchback joining the range in August 1992. Production ended in July 2003.

For the first year of production, the 1.0 and 1.1 petrol engines came with a carburettor, but they were replaced by fuel injected engines from the end of 1992, as a result of EEC emissions regulations.

== Phase I (1991–1999) ==
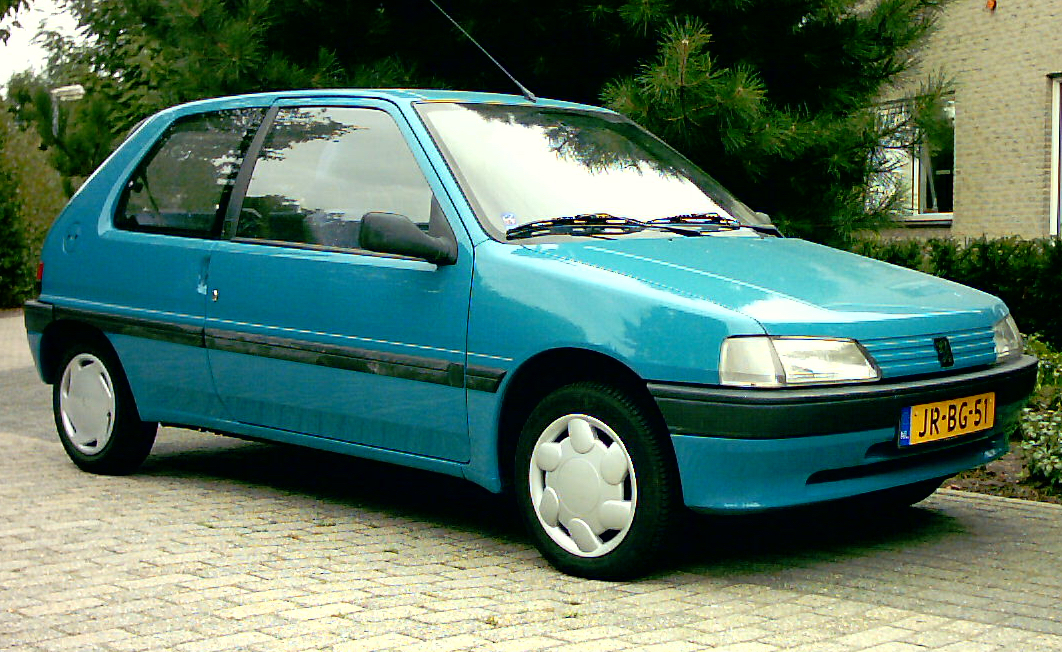

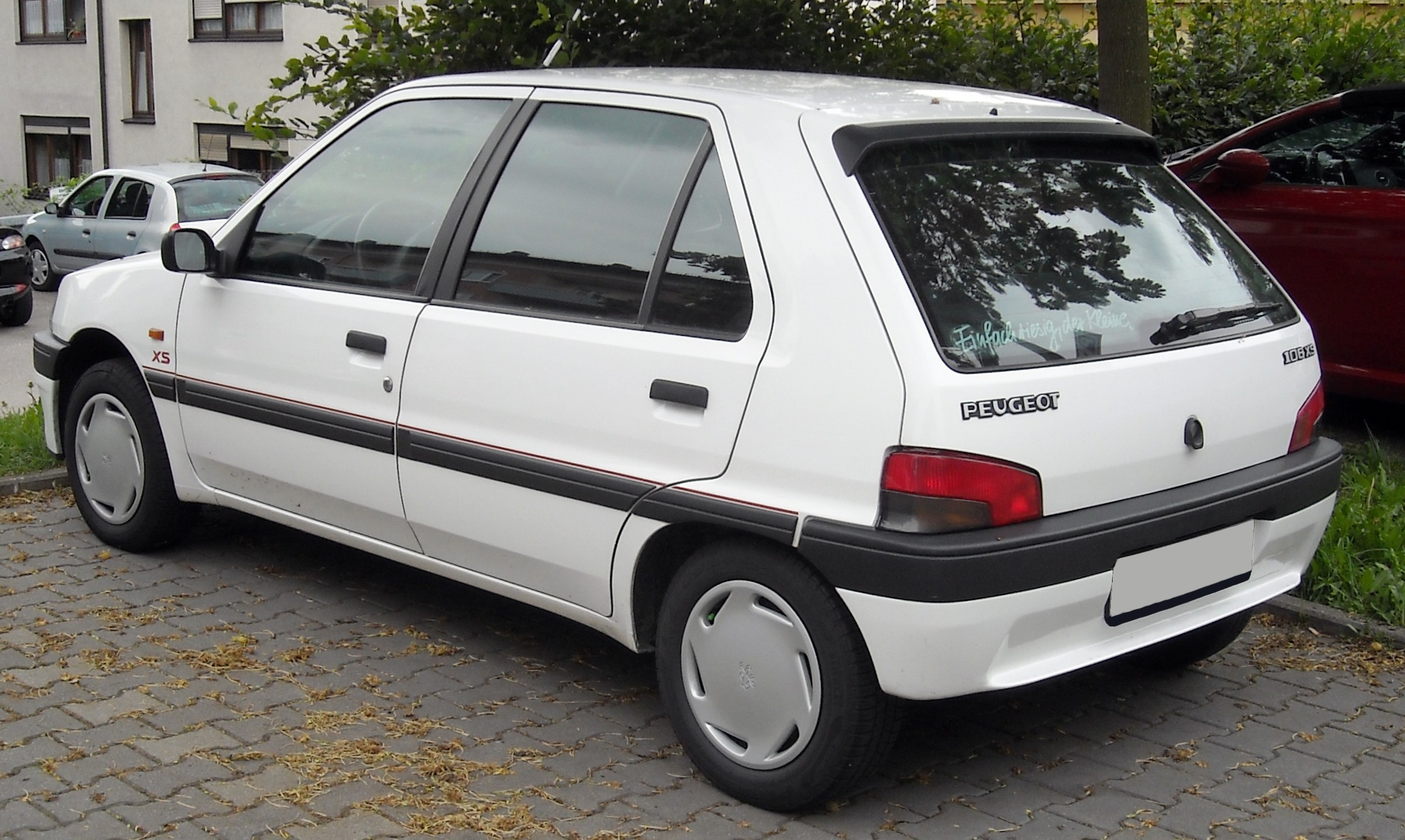
Peugeot 106 (Phase I)

The "100" line of Peugeot small cars had commenced in 1972 with the launch of the 104, one of the first modern European superminis. The 104 was effectively replaced by the Peugeot 306 in 1993, but remained in production for some markets until 1988. There was no "105". The 106 was the French brand's entry level car, slotting in beneath the 205. It was a substantial development of the Peugeot 205 platform and was aimed directly at the Renault Clio, which had gone into production a year earlier, and as a more modern alternative to the slightly larger 205. Like the 306 and the 205, it had all independent suspension with MacPherson struts at the front, and compact transverse torsion bars at the rear.

The 106 was introduced as a three-door hatchback in continental Europe in September 1991, and two months later in the United Kingdom. Initially, only a three-door model was on offer. A five-door derivative was presented in August 1992.

Trim levels were basic XN, mid-range XR, top-spec XT, and the sporty XSi model. Low-end models have areas of visible metal work on the doors and a generally more sparse interior. 1.0 and some early 1.1-litre cars were fitted with a four-speed manual gearbox, with all other models having a five-speed manual. An automatic gearbox was an option on a few engines. Most 106s had only basic features, with even a radio being only an option on some variants, such as the 106 'Kid' special edition (which had denim effect fabrics). Many of the cars sold in the United Kingdom were special editions, carrying such names as Graduate, Inca, Aztec and Independence. These were often based on the XN trim vehicles, but with the addition of bodywork graphics carrying the name of the special edition, and a few other basic options such as a tilt and slide sunroof.

In right-hand drive markets such as the United Kingdom, power steering was not available on Phase I cars as there was no space for the power steering pump. This was rectified on Phase II cars, where power steering was available as standard in higher specification models, or as an option on lower specification models. As for the 306, air-conditioning was never an option on right-hand drive 106s, because the blower motor was mounted in the bulkhead on the driver's side. As a result, there was insufficient space available to accommodate the evaporator, except by first ducting the air flow to the passenger side and then at the expense of the glovebox. Although an after-market kit was available that did exactly this, the resultant pressure loss made the system noisy and ineffective. The blower motor could also not be easily relocated, since the windscreen wiper motor was mounted in the passenger side space.

The initial engine range had 1.0, 1.1 and 1.4 petrol engines. An economic 1.4-litre diesel was added in August 1992. In late 1994, the 1.4 diesel was replaced by a larger, slightly more powerful but considerably torquier 1.5-litre derivative. The early 1.0 and 1.1s had carburettors, but these were replaced by fuel injection after a year due to EC emissions requirements. The lowest-priced 1.0 XN was discontinued for the French market in October 1994, meaning that the French range began with the 1.1-litre engine from then on.

== Phase II (1999–2003) ==
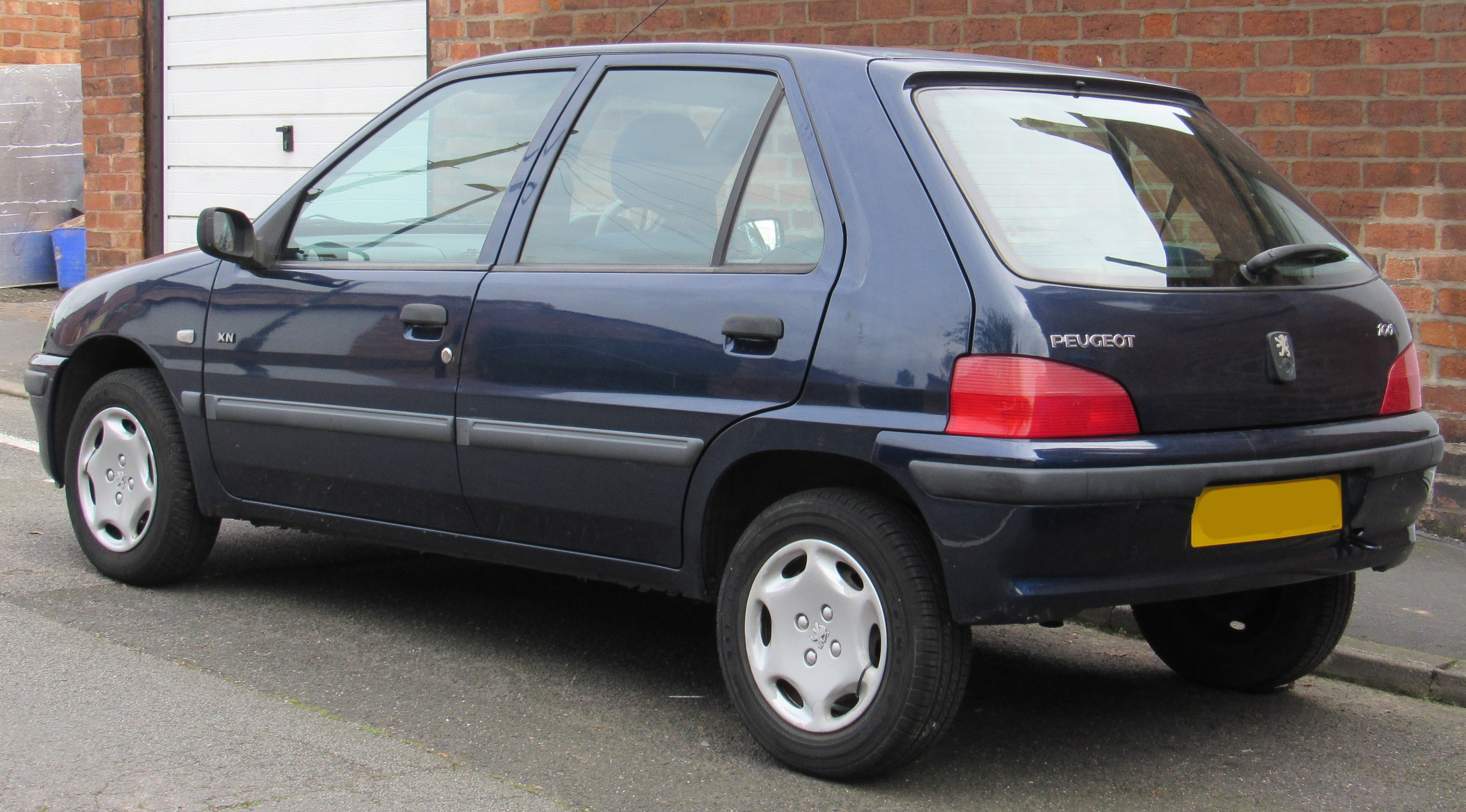
Peugeot 106 (Phase II)

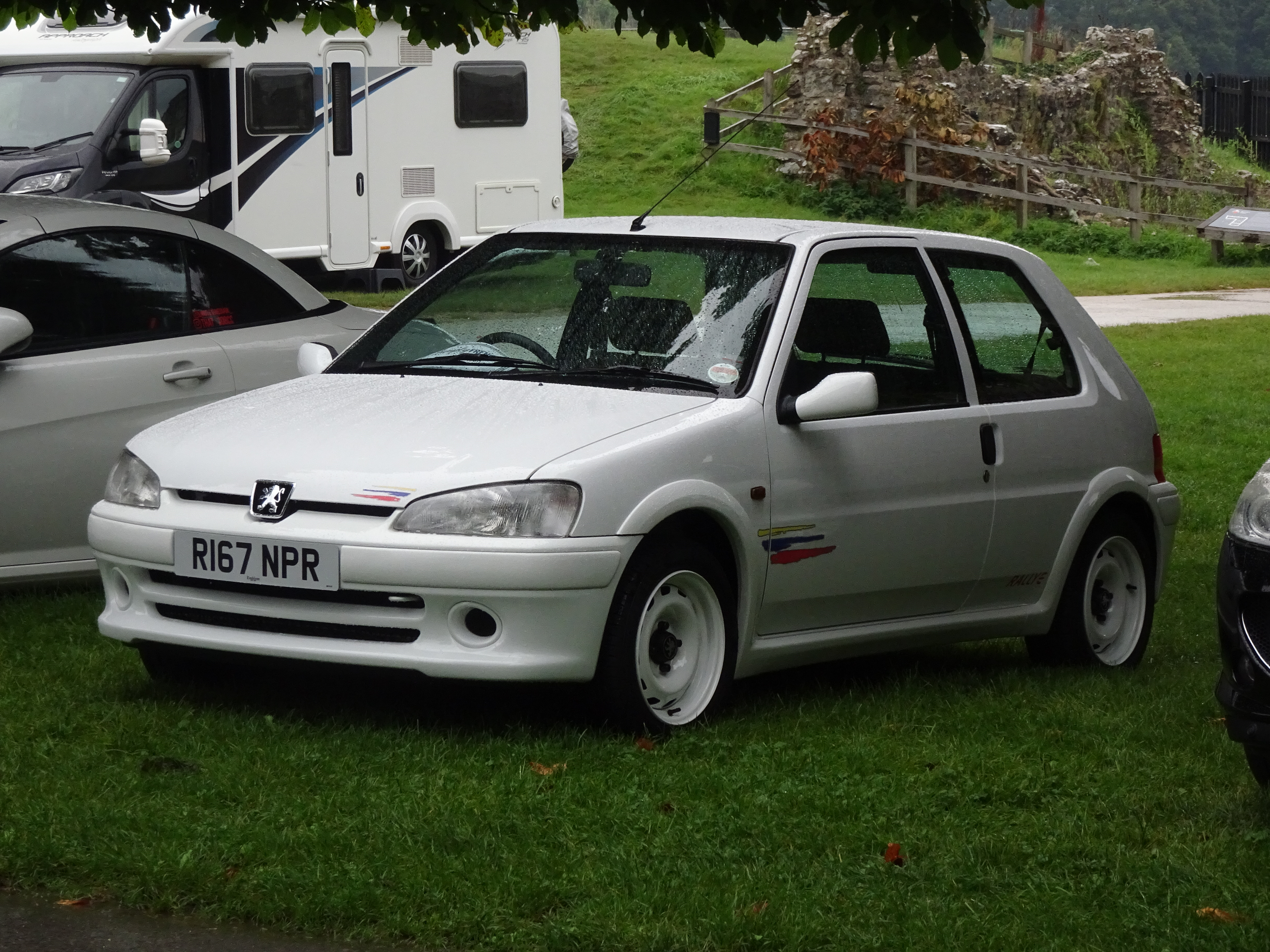
106 Rallye Phase 2

It was updated in July 1999, with changes including the introduction of side impact bars and availability of driver and passenger airbags for the first time, with the new 1.6 GTI joining the range as the spiritual successor to the hugely popular and highly regarded 205 GTI, which had been discontinued in 1994. The redesign was 114 mm (4.5 in) longer, thanks to a larger front end which resembled the design of the recently introduced 406 range.

In January 1999, the Peugeot 106 also formed the basis for the Peugeot 306, which was nearly identical in looks and size. At the end of 1998 the slightly larger Peugeot 206 arrived, providing internal competition and meaning that the 106 range was trimmed considerably. The revised range consisted only of the Zest versions (Zest, Zest 2, or Zest 3, fitted with the diesel or the smallest petrol variants) and the GTI. Various special editions such as the Quiksilver, Look, and Independence continued to be on offer as well.

The 106's successor, the Peugeot 107 (along with the rebadged Citroën C1 and Toyota Aygo) was launched two years later in June 2005, as a joint venture with Toyota.

== High performance variants ==
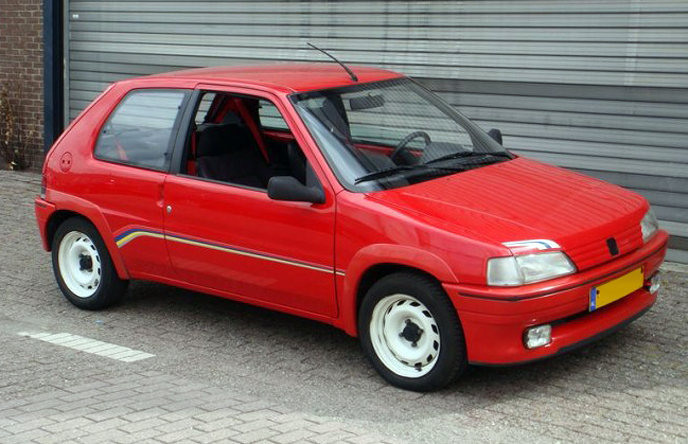
106 Rallye Phase 1

Marketed as having "fewer frills, more thrills", the Rallye version had trademark steel wheels painted white. Power steering, central locking, and electric windows were omitted to keep the weight down to 825 kg (1,819 lb).

There were pre and post facelift versions of the 106 Rallye known to enthusiasts as S1 and S2 models, with the latter having a 103 PS (76 kW), 1.6-litre (TU5J2) engine in place of the original high revving Rallye specific 1.3-litre, 100 PS (74 kW) TU2J2 engine that was fitted to pre facelift cars.

Contrary to some sources, the S1 models did not share the same engine with the 205 Rallye and 306 which used a carburettor TU24 engine. The dimensions of the aluminium S1 block resemble those of the 1.4 iron block with slightly lowered capacity to comply with the rules of the lower French rally classes at the time (under 1,300 cc). The S1 (TU2J2) and S2 (TU5J2) were fuel injected, employing Magneti Marelli multi point fuel injection systems.

The S1 Rallye were designed as a homologation special to compete in the 1300 cc rally class. It featured a four-cylinder, 8-valve, high compression engine with an aggressive cam profile designed to come "on song" between 5,400 and the 7,200 rpm redline.

This engine coupled to a short ratio five speed gearbox made the 1.3 more of a sprinter than a cruiser. 70 mph on the motorway was a noisy 4,000 rpm in fifth gear, but given enough tarmac, the 1.3 would redline in top gear at 115 mph.

The 106 was competitive in racing, but also made a practical small family car. All cars had steel wheels, and Rallye decals and seat coverings featuring a one or three colour flash, which again varied between early and late cars. With facelift came new top model named Peugeot 106 GTI with 1.6 litre 16 valves engine that produce 120 hp. It came with new exterior body kit and new wheels. On some markets in Europe, it was badged S16 or Rallye.

== Electric version ==
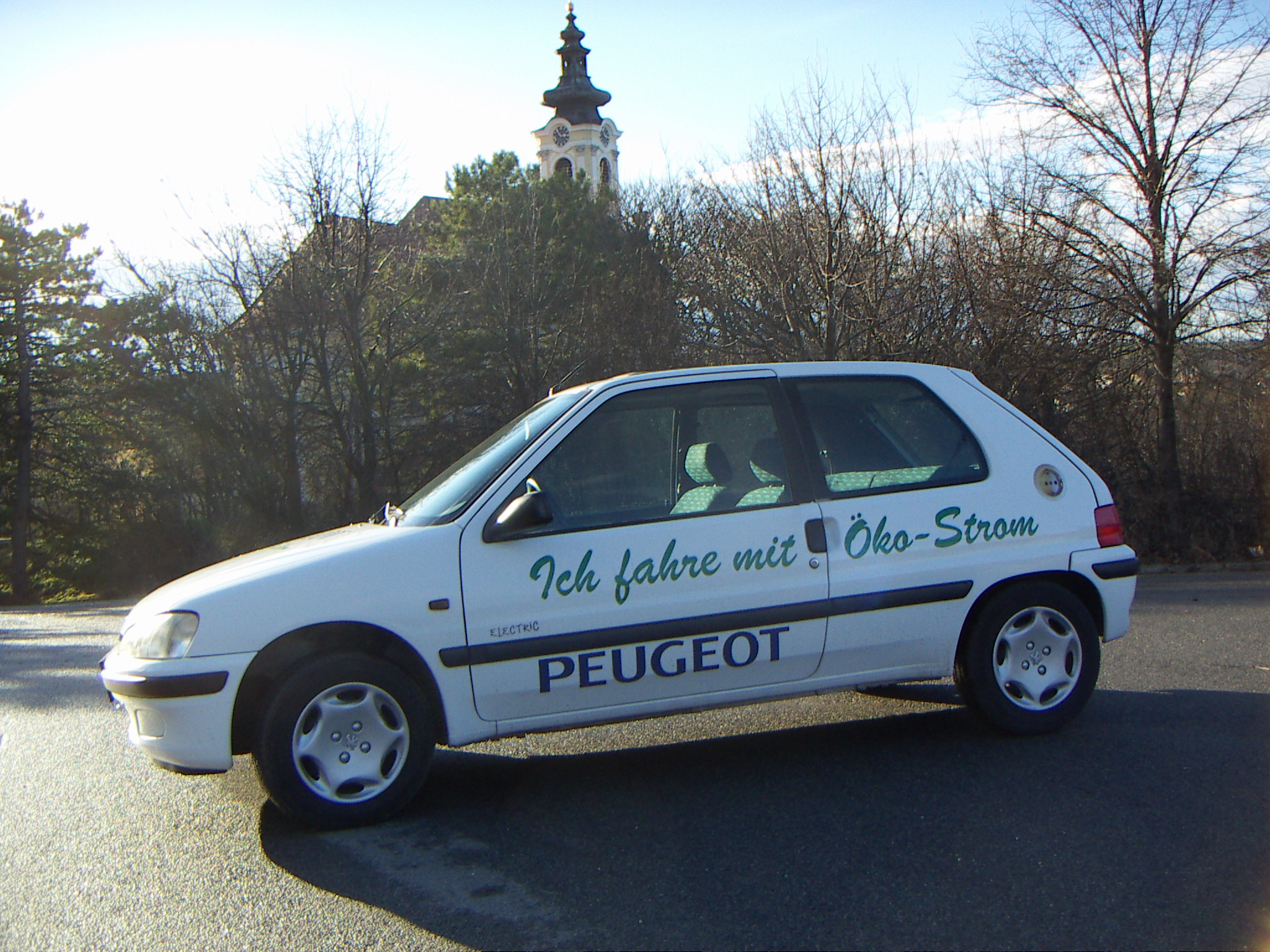
An electric Peugeot 106

In 1995, Peugeot launched an electric powered version of the 106, called the 106 Electrique. This was offered in a number of European countries including France, Belgium, The Netherlands, Switzerland, Norway and the United Kingdom.

The electric powertrain was developed and built by French engineering company Heuliez. The car used Nickel-cadmium battery technology manufactured by Saft Groupe S.A., had a top speed of 56 mph (90 km/h) and had an official range of 100 km (62 mi). Specifically, there are 20, 6V, 100Ah SAFT STM5 batteries in the car, which are liquid cooled. The car uses an AVCON style charging plug.

The motor is the same as its Citroen AX and Saxo Electrique twin, with a 20 kW (26 hp) separately excited brushed DC motor made by Leroy Somer, but was only capable of this peak power figure for short periods of time, and had a nominal power output of only 11 kW (15 hp). The car also came with a diesel heater to help with range in the winter.

Despite the high price of the vehicle, Peugeot anticipated demand for around 15,000 to 20,000 Peugeot 106 Électriques each year, with an expected total production run of 100,000 vehicles. In the end, only 6,400 Peugeot 106 Électriques were sold between 1995 and 2003, most purchased by the French Administration.

== Engines ==
=== Petrol Engines ===
Displacement	Type	Year	Fuel supply	Output	Models	Comments
1.0	TU9K	1991–1992	Solex Carburettor	45 PS (33 kW; 44 hp) at 6,000 rpm	Open, XN, Kid, Itinéa	
1.0	TU9ML/Z (CDY)	1993–1998	Mono–Motronic MA3.0	45 PS (33 kW; 44 hp) at 6,000 rpm		
1.0	TU9ML/Z (CDZ)	1993–2001	Mono–Motronic MA3.0	50 PS (37 kW; 49 hp) at 6,000 rpm		This engine is fitted in most of the cars sold in Brazil, because of a tax on engines over 1.0 litres, being retained until the end of the imports of the model in the end of 2001.
1.1	TU1K	1991–1992	Solex Carburettor	60 PS (44 kW; 59 hp)	Zen, Color Line, Quiksilver, Open, Equinoxe, Pop Art, Mistral, Kid, XN, XR, sketch	
1.1	TU1ML/Z (HDZ)	1991–1997	Mono–Jetronic	50 PS (37 kW; 49 hp) at 5,800 rpm		
1.1	TU1ML/Z (HDZ)	1993–1996	Magneti Marelli FDG6	60 PS (44 kW; 59 hp) at 6,200 rpm		
1.1	TU1M (HDY)	1997–1999	Motronic MA3.1	54 PS (40 kW; 53 hp) at 6,200 rpm		
1.1	TU1M (HDZ)	1997–2001	Motronic MA3.1	60 PS (44 kW; 59 hp) at 6,200 rpm		
1.1	TU1JP (HFX)	2000–2003	Motronic MP 7.4.4	60 PS (44 kW; 59 hp) at 5,500 rpm	Independence	
1.3	TU2J2L/Z (MFZ)	1993–1996	Magneti Marelli 8P	98 PS (72 kW; 97 hp) at 7,200 rpm	Rallye » phase 1	
1.4	TU3K	1991–1992	Solex carburettor	75 PS (55 kW; 74 hp) at 5,500 rpm		
1.4	TU3M/Z (KDY)	1991–1993	Mono–Jetronic	75 PS (55 kW; 74 hp) at 5,800 rpm	Color Line, Sport, Quiksilver, Enfant terrible, Equinoxe, Symbio, XR, XS, XT	
1.4	TU3FJ2 (K6B)	1991–1992	Motronic MP3.1	100 PS (74 kW; 99 hp) at 6,600 rpm	XSi 1.4 (Pre-cat model)	
1.4	TU3FJ2 (KFZ)	1993–1996	Motronic MP3.1	95 PS (70 kW; 94 hp) at 6,600 rpm	XSi 1.4	
1.4	TU3M (KDX)	1993–1996	Mono - Motronic MA3.0	75 PS (55 kW; 74 hp) at 5,800 rpm		
1.4	TU3JP (KFX)	1997–2001	Magneti Marelli 1AP	75 PS (55 kW; 74 hp) at 5,500 rpm		
1.4	TU3JP/IFI4 (KFX)	1998–2001	Motronic MP7.3	75 PS (55 kW; 74 hp) at 5,500 rpm		
1.6	TU5J2 (NFY)	1994–1996	Magneti Marelli 8P	103 PS (76 kW; 102 hp) at 6,200 rpm	XSi 1.6	
1.6	TU5JP (NFZ)	1997–2001	Motronic MP5.2	88 PS (65 kW; 87 hp) at 5,600 rpm		
1.6	TU5J2 (NFW)	1997–2000	Magneti Marelli 8P	103 PS (76 kW; 102 hp) at 6,200 rpm	Rallye » Phase 2	
1.6	TU5J4 (NFX)	1996–2003	Magneti Marelli 1AP	118 PS (87 kW; 116 hp) at 6,600 rpm	GTi, Rallye Phase 2 16V	In later years, Peugeot started putting the TU5J4 engine into the Phase 2 rallyes, though these were not available in every country.

=== Diesel Engines ===
Displacement	Type	Year	Fuel supply	Output	Models	Comments
1.4	TUD3Y (K9Y)	1992–1994		50 PS (37 kW) at 5,000 rpm	XND, XRD, XTD	
1.5	(VJX/VJY)	1999–2003	Bosch VP 20	58 PS (43 kW) at 5,000 rpm	XND, ZEST 2	In the United Kingdom, VJX engine code has Catalytic Converter, EGR and the fuel pump advance mechanism controlled by an ECU mounted on top of the battery.
1.5	TUD5Y (VJZ)	1994–2003	Lucas Type 070	58 PS (43 kW) at 5,000 rpm	XRD, XLD, XND, XTD, Kid, Equinoxe, Open, Symbio, Color Line	

== Special Editions ==
As with most Peugeot models at the time, there were many special editions of the 106 offered between 1991 and 2003.

== Motorsport ==
=== National Saloon Car Cup ===
The Peugeot 106 raced in the National Saloon Car Cup in the early 1990s.

In 1993, Olympic decathlete Daley Thompson raced a Peugeot in the NSCC and won his class at Thruxton.

=== Endurance Racing ===
Daley Thompson also entered his Peugeot 106 in the 1993 Willhire 24 Hour race at Snetterton.

The Peugeot 106 raced in the Nurburgring 24 Hours every year from 1993 to 2003 and the Spa 24 Hours from 1997 to 1999. Its best result was 11th at Spa in 1998.
