= Nidec Leroy-Somer =

French company

Logo of the company

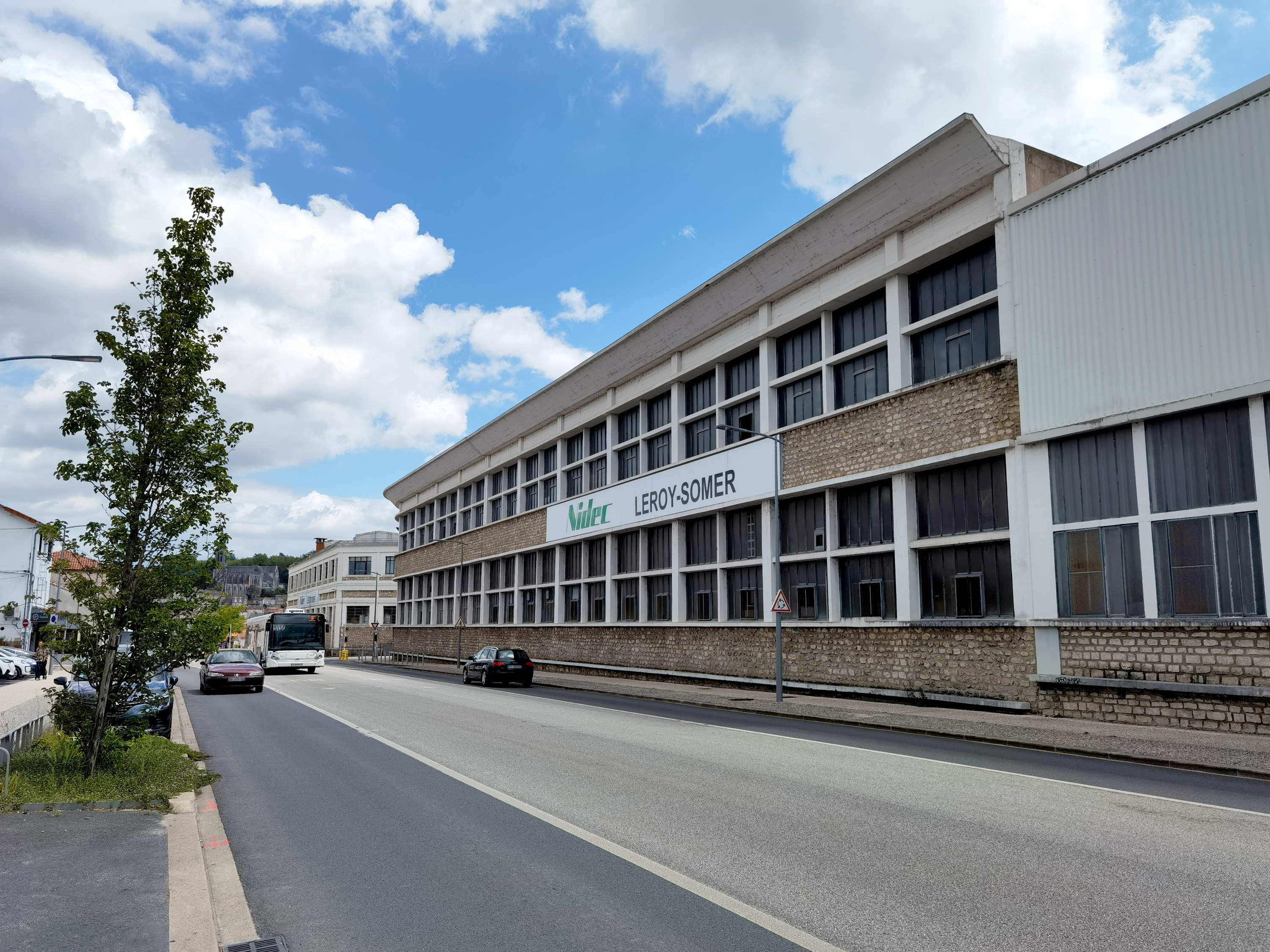
Front of the Sillac plant in Angoulême, Poitou-Charentes

Nidec Leroy-Somer is a French company based in Angoulême, Charente which manufactures mainly electric motors. It was established in 1919 by Marcellin Leroy.

The firm has now expanded in the Czech Republic, Hungary, Poland, Romania, China and India, with almost 10,000 employees.

Since January 31, 2017, Leroy-Somer has become a part of the Japanese Nidec Group.
