= Ford Puma (coupé) =

Small three-door coupé

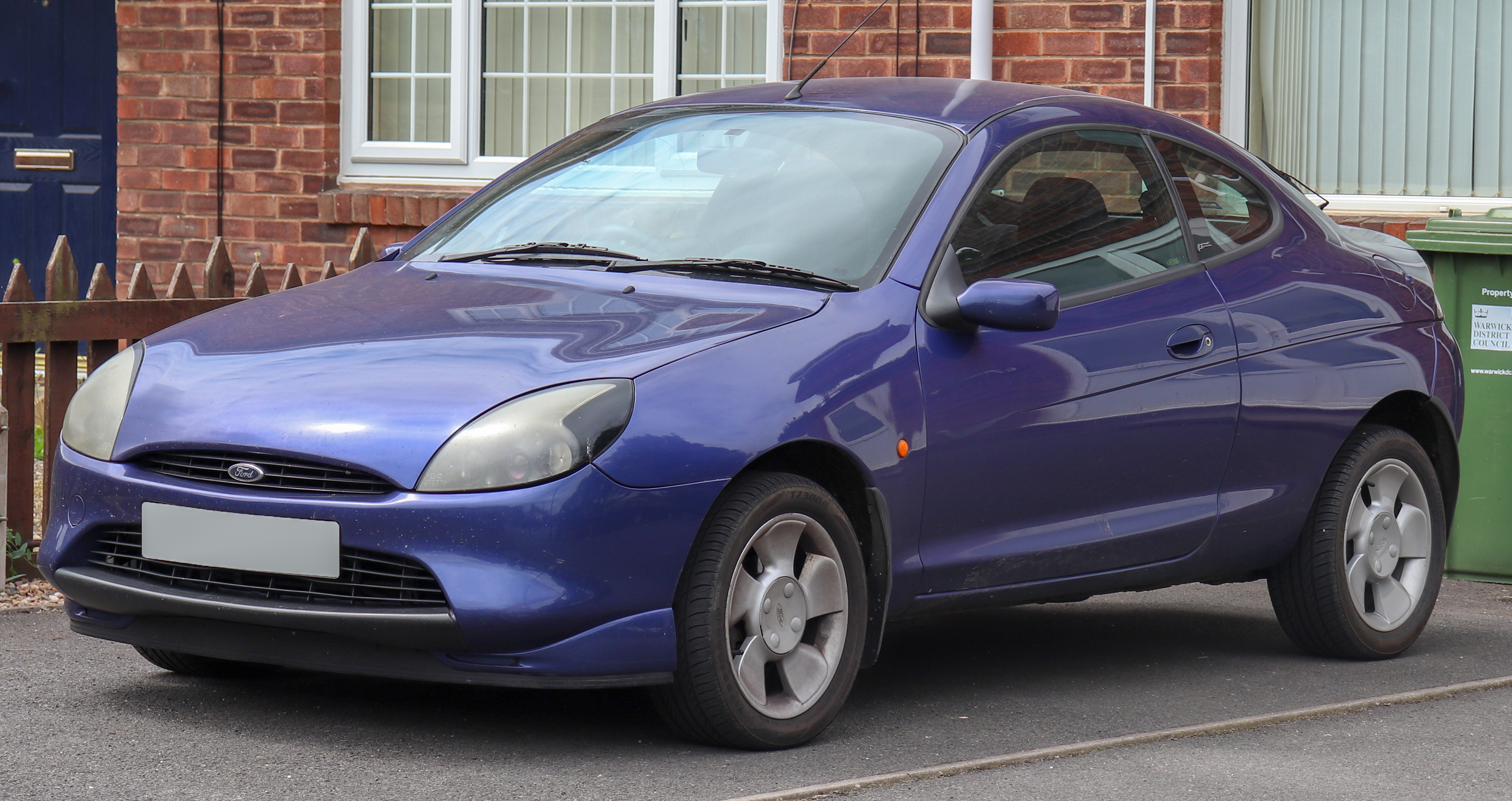

Overview
- Manufacturer: Ford
- Production: June 1997 – 2001
- Assembly: Germany: Cologne
- Designer: Chris Svensson

Body and chassis
- Class: Sports car
- Body style: 3-door coupé
- Layout: Front-engine, front-wheel drive
- Platform: Ford B platform
- Related: Ford Fiesta Mark IV

Powertrain
- Engine: 1.4l i4 Zetec (1997–2000) 1.6L I4 Zetec (2000–2002) 1.7L I4 Zetec
- Transmission: 5-speed IB5 manual

Dimensions
- Wheelbase: 2,446 mm (96.3 in)
- Length: 3,984 mm (156.9 in)
- Width: 1,837 mm (72.3 in)
- Height: 1,315 mm (51.8 in)
- Kerb weight: 1,035–1,039 kg (2,282–2,291 lb)

The Ford Puma is a small car that was produced by Ford Europe from June 1997 to 2001. The Puma is a three-door coupé that is based on the Mark IV Ford Fiesta and was built at Ford's Niehl plant in Cologne, Germany. The Puma follows common design cues with other Ford cars at the time, and is in the New Edge family of vehicles.

== Concept ==
The Ford Puma program was initiated in 1993 when then–Ford CEO and President Jacques Nasser and Ford Small and Medium Vehicle design director Claude Lobo discussed the possibility of doing a 2+2 coupe based on the Fiesta chassis. All development was done using the Paintbox CAD system, which allowed designers to render 2D and 3D models.

The first iteration of the design, called the Lynx concept car, was unveiled at the Geneva Motor Show in 1996, and the production car was launched at the 1997 Geneva Motor Show.

== Technical details ==
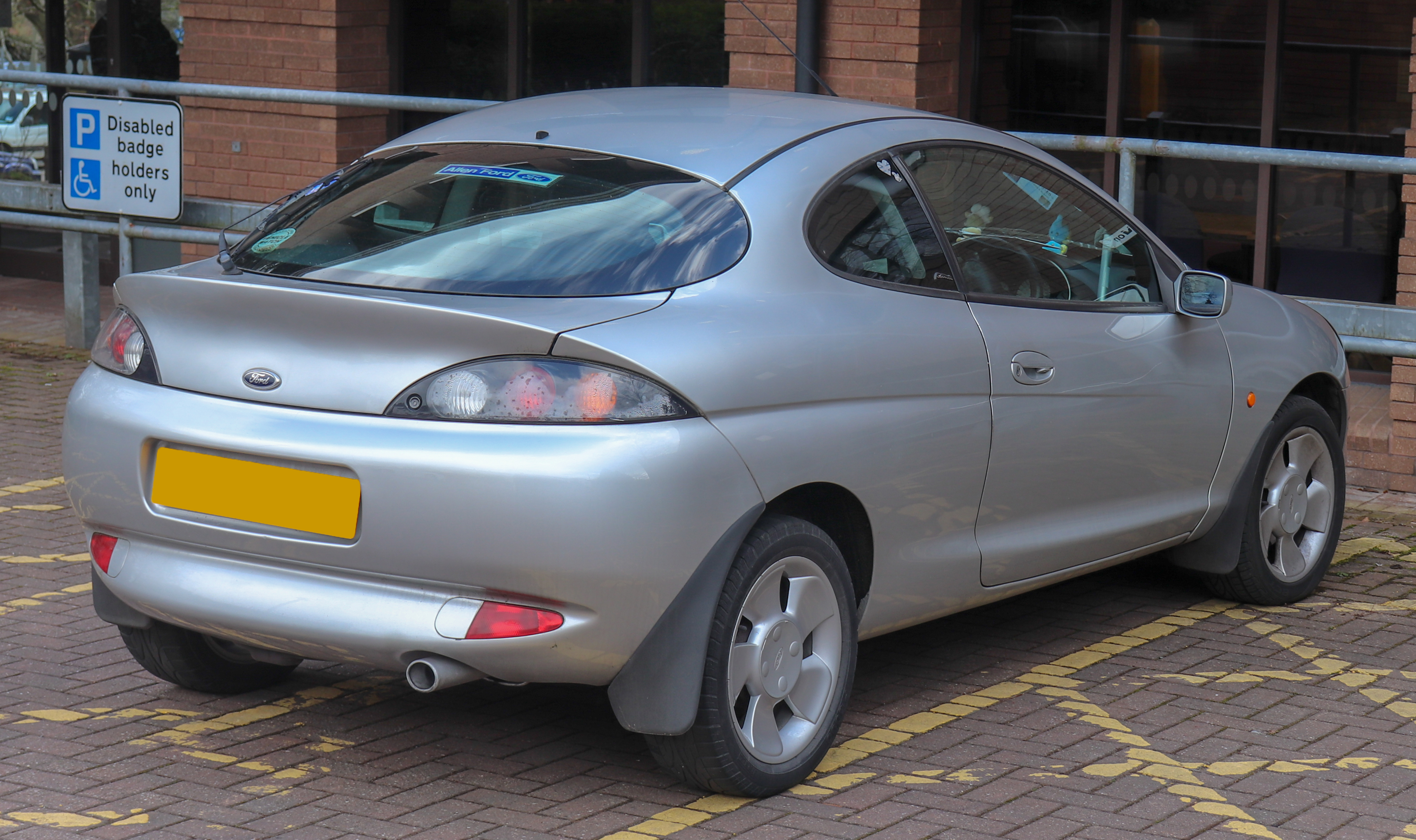
1999 Ford Puma rear

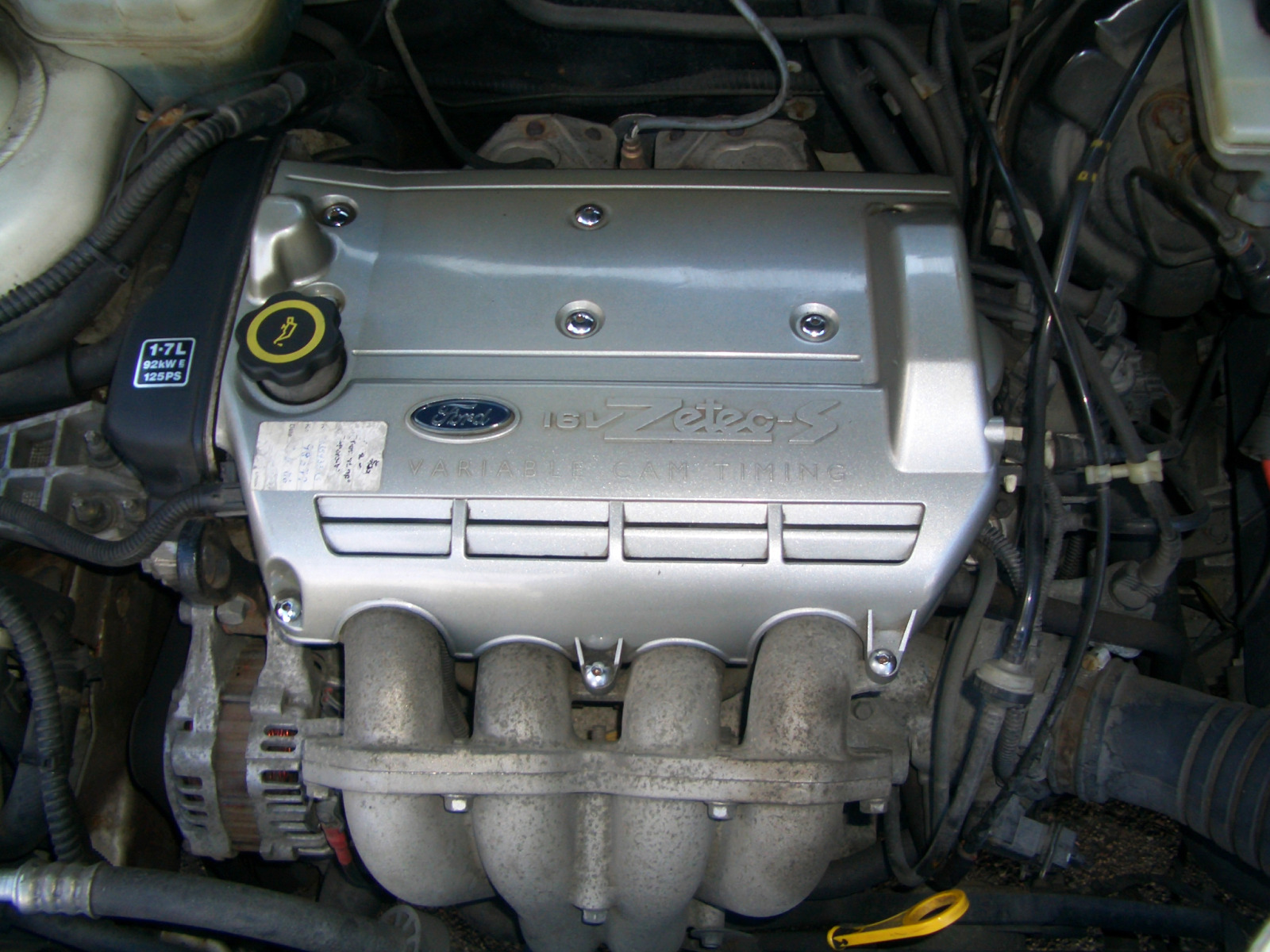
1.7-litre Zetec-S VCT engine in a 1999 Ford Puma

The Puma is a front-engined, front-wheel-drive, three-door coupé with four seats. They came with 15-inch (380 mm) alloy wheels as standard, (although the Ford Racing Puma was equipped with 17-inch (430 mm) alloy wheels), with front disc and rear drum brakes. However, the Ford Racing Puma was fitted with front and rear disc brakes. The car was based on the Mark 4 Ford Fiesta, with new engines (codeveloped with Yamaha), a new body, stiffer suspension, wider track and close-ratio gearbox, among other changes.

The Puma was available with four engine options: 1.4-litre (1997–2000), 1.6-litre (2000–2001), 1.7-litre VCT (only used in the Puma), and the Tickford-tuned 1.7-litre VCT (which was only used in the Ford Racing Puma), each of which used Ford's 16-v Sigma engines branded as Zetec-SE. Additionally, the 1.7-litre engines used Nikasil cylinder plating, which required a specific grade of oil (5W30 semisynthetic) to minimise mechanical wear.

Regarding the production journey of the 1.7-litre VCT, rough machined cylinder blocks were shipped from Ford's Valencia plant in Spain to Yamaha in Japan for Nikasil coating and completion. These were then shipped back to Ford's Cologne plant where the Puma was assembled.

All 1.7-litre-engined Pumas were equipped with low-speed traction control and antilock brakes. The antilock braking system was optional in the 1.4-litre Puma.

During the relatively short production run, approximately 133,000 Pumas were built (all models including the Ford Racing Puma). At its peak, 52,950 were registered with the DVLA in the UK, which has since reduced to 7,493 (including 5,457 that have statutory off-road notification (SORN)) as of Q3 2023.

=== Engines ===
Engine, litre (cm^{3})	Power	Torque	0–100 km/h (0-62 mph)	Top speed
1.4 (1388) 16-V	91 PS (67 kW; 90 hp) @ 5500 rpm	125 N⋅m (92 lb⋅ft)	10.8 s	180 km/h (112 mph)
1.6 (1596) 16-V	104 PS (76 kW; 103 hp) @ 6000 rpm	145 N⋅m (107 lb⋅ft)	10.1 s	190 km/h (118 mph)
1.7 (1679) 16-V VCT	125 PS (92 kW; 123 hp) @ 6300 rpm	157 N⋅m (116 lb⋅ft)	9.2 s	203 km/h (126 mph)
1.7 (1679) 16-V VCT	155 PS (114 kW; 153 hp) @ 7000 rpm	162 N⋅m (119 lb⋅ft)	7.9 s	203 km/h (126 mph)

== UK special editions ==
=== Millennium ===
Years available: 1999(V) to 2000(X)

Quantity produced: 1000

Peak quantity registered with DVLA (UK): 899 (2001 Q4)

Quantity remaining registered with DVLA (UK): 301 (including 216 that are SORN) as of Q3 2023

The Ford Millennium Edition cars were produced to commemorate the Millennium Products Award from the Design Council in 1999 for being 'The first Ford in Britain designed solely on computer and in record time.' The Millennium Edition Puma featured eye-catching Zinc Yellow paintwork, and an Alchemy Blue (dark/navy blue) leather interior with Recaro seats. A numbered badge and keyring were available upon purchase from Ford, but the cars were not automatically numbered.

The Ford Ka and Focus also received the same award, and were also produced in the same quantity and paintwork, but with black leather interiors.

=== Black ===
Years available: 2000(X) to 2001(51)

Quantity produced: 1600

Peak quantity registered with DVLA (UK): 1579 (2003 Q4)

Quantity remaining registered with DVLA (UK): 302 (including 226 that are SORN) as of Q3 2023

The Puma Black featured a Midnight Black (dark grey) leather interior, Panther Black paintwork, and Ford's F1-style alloy wheels. The original quantity of the Puma Black was meant to be only 1000, but as the edition proved to be popular, an additional 600 were produced.

=== Thunder ===
Years available: 2000(X) to 2002(52)

Quantity produced: 2000 (1000 each in Moondust Silver and Magnum Grey)

Peak quantity registered with DVLA (UK): 1908 (2002 Q4)

Quantity remaining registered with DVLA (UK): 557 (including 371 that are SORN) as of Q3 2023

These were among the final 2000 Pumas produced. Although Moondust Silver was available throughout the whole of the production run, Magnum Grey was only available on the Thunder Edition. All of the Thunder Editions featured a Midnight Black (dark grey) leather interior, a six-disc CD changer and multispoke alloy wheels similar to those featured on the Fiesta Zetec-S.

=== Ford Racing Puma (FRP) ===
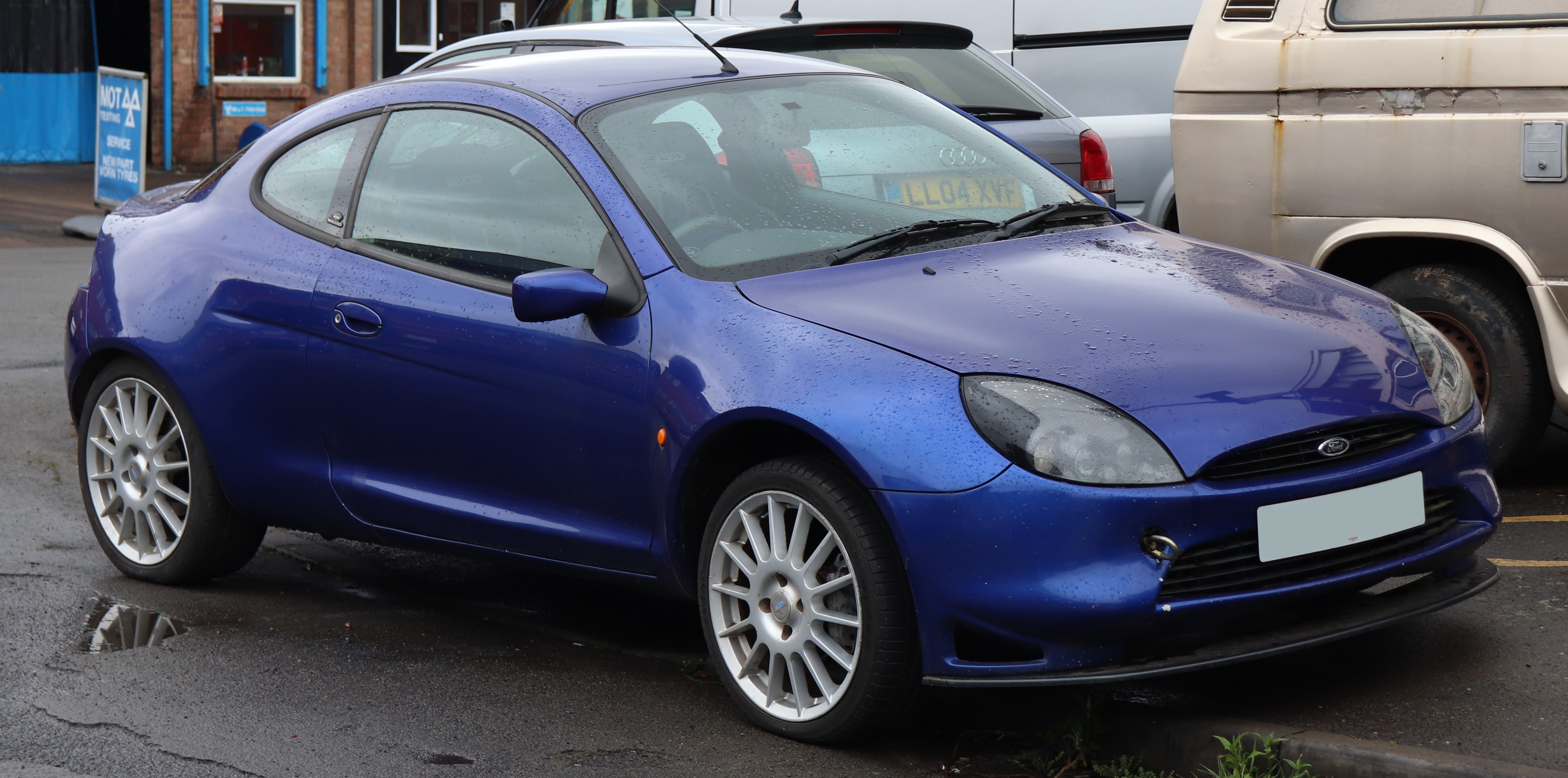

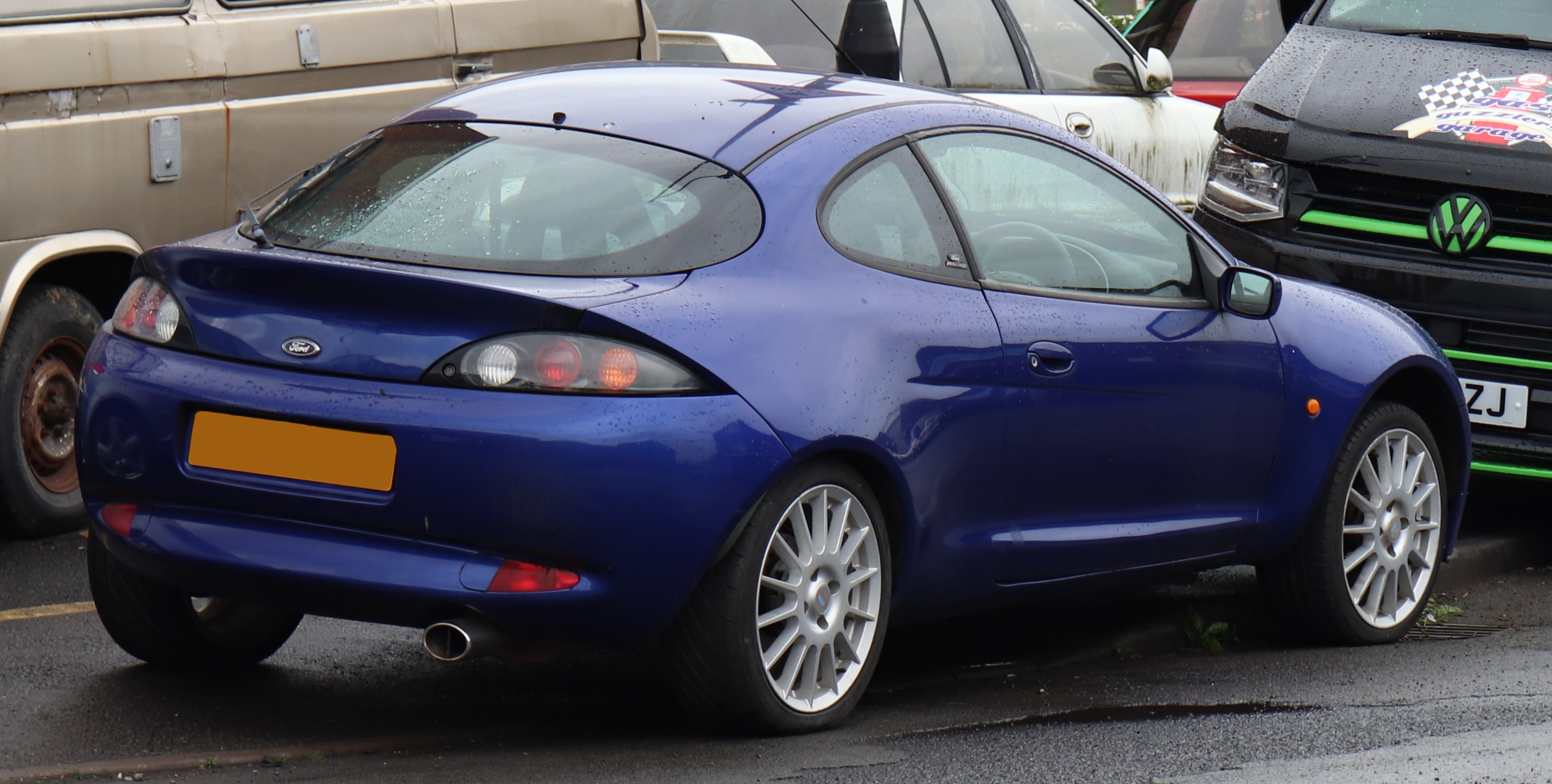
Ford Racing Puma

Years available: 1999(V) to 2001(51)

Quantity produced: 500 (all numbered on inlet manifold)

The Ford Racing Puma was the name eventually given to Ford's concept Puma, the Puma ST160 Concept, which was first unveiled to the public at the 1999 Geneva Motor Show. At the time, Ford were keen to stress that this was no mere styling job and the idea was to transfer the know-how and technology learned directly from Ford Puma race and rally programmes to a road car. It was created by the Ford Rally specialist team at Boreham. The strictly limited production run was initially pencilled to run for 1000 units, with 500 destined for the German market, and 500 for the UK. All conversions were carried out by Tickford, Daventry UK. In the end, only the 500 destined for the UK market were produced and sold.

Less than half of the 500 cars were actually sold directly to customers, with the vehicle's high price (£23,000 when new) often cited as a reason, as rival performance cars such as the Subaru Impreza (with an additional 50+ BHP/Turbo, four-wheel-drive and rallying pedigree) were being offered for a maximum of £21,000 with the optional Pro Drive pack. The lower than anticipated demand had Ford offering Racing Pumas to senior managers through their MRC scheme, which enabled cars to continue being registered and converted. The lack of demand when brand new has allowed it to maintain an increased value over the standard Puma due to its rarity.

==== Braking system ====
For the Racing Puma, Ford partnered with Alcon Design to produce a 4-Piston Motorsport braking system. The Alcon Racing Front Brake calipers use 295 mm (11.6 in) x 28mm discs (253mm discs on the rear). These brakes are one of the defining attributes of the Racing Puma and they contribute significantly to enabling the standard 1,174 kg (2,588 lb) car to pull a substantial 1.1g+ of braking force in the dry. This compares well to the normal Puma's ability to achieve 0.7g on regular, smaller, 258 mm (10.2 in) x 22 mm (0.9 in) brake discs and calipers.

The brake calipers themselves, being derived from a racing set-up, do not come fitted with any protective rubber boots which prevent brake dust and debris from coming into contact with the brake pistons. This means the brakes should be serviced regularly (fully dismantled and properly cleaned) to maintain efficiency. Furthermore, the inner portions of the caliper were unpainted aluminium, and are susceptible to corrosion.

==== Bodywork and handling ====
The bodywork was beefed up with wider, lightweight aluminium front and steel rear overhangs; these covered a substantially widened track at both the front and rear, requiring longer drive shafts unique to the Racing Puma. A front aerodynamic air splitter and modified wider front bumper with sports grille were used. The wheels are MiM Speedline alloys, 17 x 7.5 in (with an ET28 Offset) and use 215/40 17 tyres (original fitment tyres were Michelin SXGT 215/40 R17), this increases the width from 1674 mm to 1770 mm. The S1600 rally Puma is just 35 mm wider than this.

The Racing Puma's suspension was developed and honed by Ford's specialist division at Boreham, Essex, and the cars' monocoque shell was originally designed to be Ford's WRC entrant. Stig Blomqvist spent months fine-tuning the car's handling to ensure its chassis dynamics were perfected. The wider track, uprated springs, dampers, and special geometry settings refined the car's cornering poise to a level beyond the standard car's handling. The upshot of the improved chassis finesse was a bias towards tracks, hence the car has a very firm ride.

All Racing Pumas left the factory painted metallic Imperial Blue to signify their special racing edition status. This colour was only used by Ford on a select range of cars such as the Ford Escort Cosworth and Mk.1 Ford Focus RS edition models. The colour was not available on the regular Pumas in the UK market.

==== Gearbox and optional limited-slip differential ====
The standard IB5 gearbox was strengthened on the Racing Puma in comparison to the standard models. It contains modified shafts, which have been shot peened to withstand the extra load placed upon them. This allowed a revised Power-train Control Module software to be used, allowing more power and torque to be used in lower gears.

Additionally, Ford Racing offered an optional limited-slip differential to enhance handling even further, only 75 customer cars actually came equipped with that option from factory, but since then, subsequent owners have been known to retrofit it.

==== Interior ====
Sparco were commissioned to provide high-grip bucket seats for improved driver control in cornering situations. The blue Alcantara trim used on the seats and steering wheel provided improved grip over other material types. The door cards, rear seats, and rear interior were also trimmed with the same material, and the front seats were embroidered with the Ford Racing emblem.

==== FRP engine ====
The original design remit was to achieve 180 bhp using a 1.7-litre Zetec SE equipped with a turbocharger. However, due to spiralling project costs, this was not achieved and eventually the Racing Puma engineers were forced to keep their changes within a naturally aspirated engine. The majority of the engine remained unchanged from the 1.7 Zetec SE used in the standard Puma. Only the camshafts, air intake (with the unique edition number engraved on it), a specially tuned complete exhaust system by Janspeed, and a revised engine management software helped to increase power by 30 hp, reducing the 0-62 mph (100 km/h) time to 7.8 seconds, achieving a 126 mph (203 km/h) top speed.

== Rallying ==
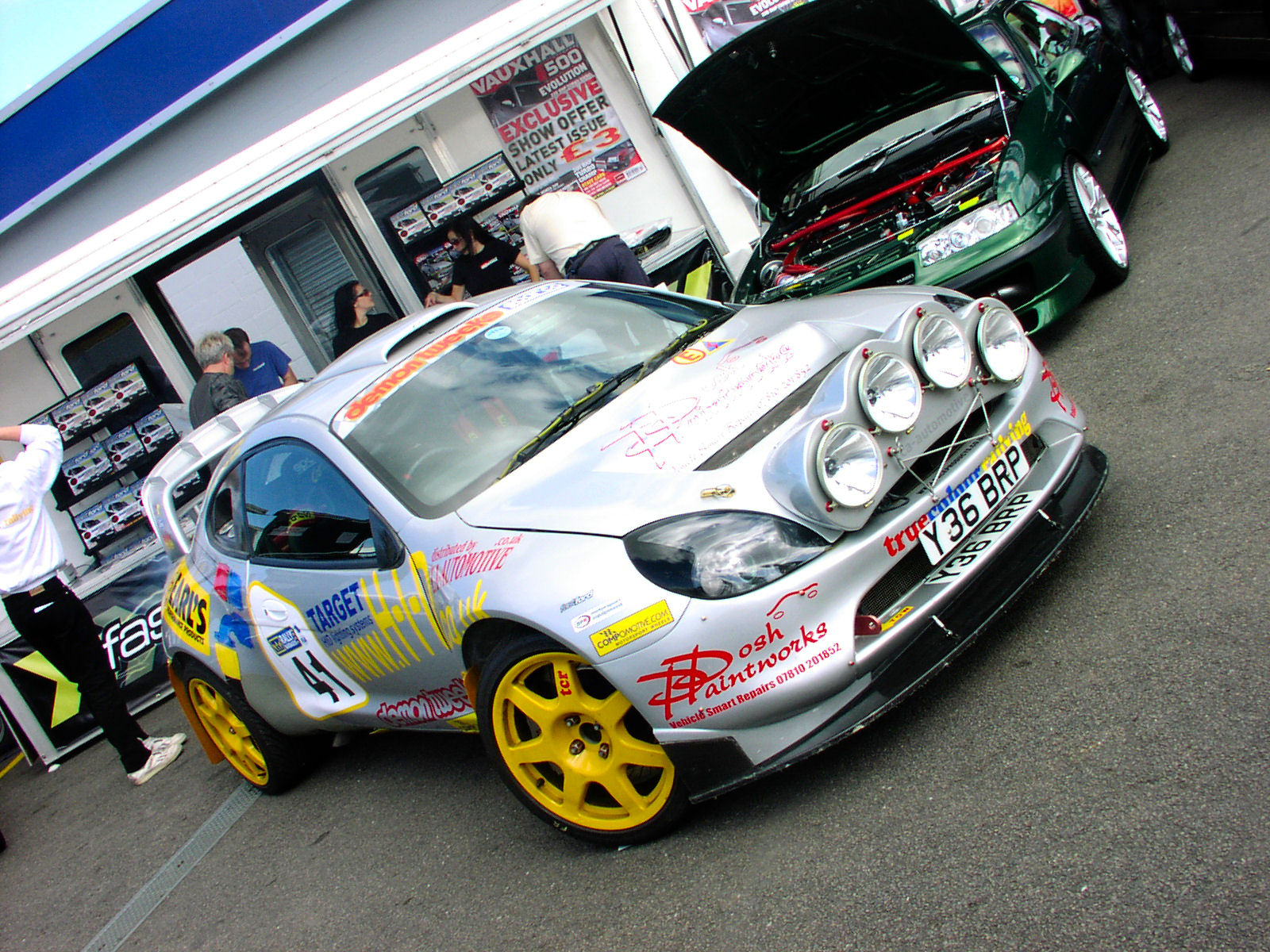
Ford Puma rally car of Andrew Costin-Hurley and Bryan Hull at Trax 2006

Ford produced a Ford Puma kit car, which was designed specifically for rallying. The Puma's technical details included a Zetec SE all-alloy engine with four cylinders and 16 valves at 1596 cm^{3}, power over 200 bhp (150 kW) at 9000 rpm, front wheel drive via a Hewland six-speed sequential gearbox, limited slip differential, dynamic front suspension using MacPherson struts with adjustable spring platforms, Ford Racing rear trailing arm beam with adjustable dynamic suspension, Alcon front brakes with 355 mm (14.0 in) diameter ventilated discs using four-piston calipers, Alcon 260 mm (10 in) diameter solid disc rear brakes with two piston calipers, a welded steel safety roll cage, and front and rear wheel arches and bumpers in composite.

The fuel tank was a 55-litre capacity FIA 'bag' tank located beneath the rear floor. Wheels were Tarmac 7 x 17 in aluminium wheels or 6 x 15 in aluminium wheels for gravel.

== Style and advertising ==
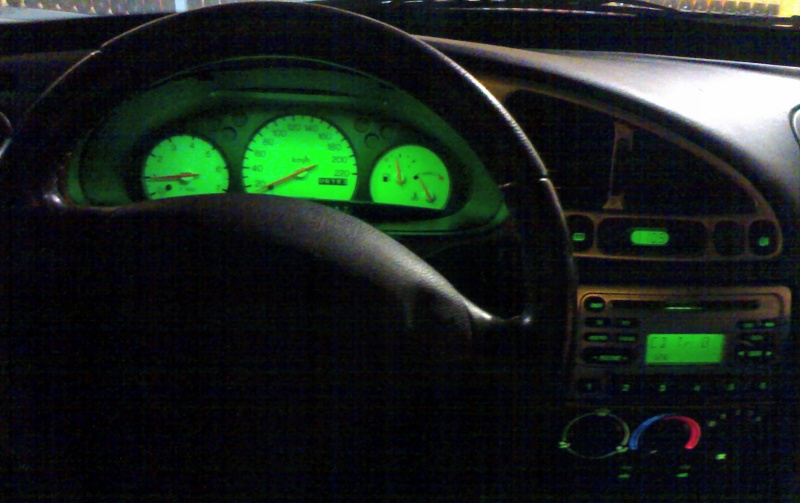
Puma interior at night

Stylistically, the Puma followed Ford's New Edge design strategy, as first seen in the 1996 Ford Ka. While not as controversial as the Ka when it first appeared, the Puma did achieve critical acclaim for its well-proportioned and cat-like design cues.

The Puma was memorable for its pan-European launch campaign that featured Steve McQueen. The original United Kingdom television advertisement used clips from the movie Bullitt and cut McQueen into the modern setting of a Puma in San Francisco. In Q4 2004, Ford once again used the McQueen footage for the first 2005 Ford Mustang commercial in the United States. Both commercials were directed by British director Paul Street, and won many advertising industry awards, featuring in all-time top 10 ad charts.

== Discontinuation ==
The Puma was only sold in Europe. Production ended in 2001, although sale of stock vehicles continued until late 2002. Ford did not replace it with another small coupé, and instead introduced the Ford StreetKa, a two-seater convertible based on the Fiesta like the Puma was. The StreetKa also borrowed the Puma's transmission and suspension. There are 7,493 Ford Pumas (including cars declared as SORN) that remain registered with the DVLA in the UK as of Q3 2023. The name was revived by Ford as a crossover model in 2019.

== Awards ==
- 1997 – Named Top Gear's Car of the Year for "the incredible feeling and driving sensation."
- 1999 – Design Council Millennium Products award for "The first Ford in Britain designed solely on computer and in record time."
- 2001 – What Car?: Used Sports Car of the Year – Ford Puma 1.7
- 2004 – What Car?: Best Used Sporting Car of the Year Under £10,000 – Ford Puma 1.7
- 2011 – What Car?: Best "Gem For Under £1,000" – Ford Puma 1.7
