= 2004 Race of Champions =

Motor racing competition

Seasons
- ← 2003 2005 →

Layout of 2004 Race of Champions

The 2004 Race of Champions took place on December 4 at the Stade de France in Saint-Denis. Unlike previous events at a gravel course in Gran Canaria, the new Stade de France event was all-tarmac, so road racers became more competitive than rally drivers.

The Nations' Cup underwent some significant changes - nations were now represented by only two competitors instead of three, with the motorcyclists axed. In addition, the rules regarding having one rally driver and one circuit driver were relaxed, leading to some all-circuit driver teams. As the host nation, France was permitted to field two teams.

The individual event was won by a then-relatively unknown Heikki Kovalainen, and the team event by Jean Alesi and Sébastien Loeb representing France. There was also a special "World Champions Challenge" race held between 2004 Formula One world champion Michael Schumacher and 2004 world rally champion Sébastien Loeb, which Schumacher won.

== Participants ==
Country	Driver 1	Driver 2
Brazil	Felipe Massa	Tony Kanaan
Finland	Heikki Kovalainen	Marcus Grönholm
France	Jean Alesi	Sébastien Loeb
France (Team PlayStation)	Sébastien Bourdais	Stéphane Sarrazin
Germany	Michael Schumacher	Armin Schwarz
(United Kingdom) Great Britain	David Coulthard	Colin McRae
Sweden	Kenny Bräck	Mattias Ekström
(United States) USA	Casey Mears*	Jimmie Johnson

* - Casey Mears was a last-minute substitute for Jeff Gordon, who was hospitalized with the flu and told not to participate in this event by doctors while at NASCAR's awards banquet in New York City that week.

== Race of Champions ==
=== Racing Group ===
Quarter-finals
ROC Car
(Finland) Heikki Kovalainen	1:45.8988
(United Kingdom) David Coulthard	1:56.9983 (penalty)
ROC Car
(United States) Casey Mears	1:45.4170
(France) Jean Alesi	1:44.8707
ROC Car
(Sweden) Kenny Bräck	1:59.0832 (penalty)
(France) Sébastien Bourdais	1:43.9553
ROC Car
(Germany) Michael Schumacher	1:43.6905
(Brazil) Felipe Massa	1:53.6368 (penalty)

Semi-finals
Ferrari 360 Modena
(Finland) Heikki Kovalainen	1:48.9325
(France) Jean Alesi	1:50.6410
Ferrari 360 Modena
(France) Sébastien Bourdais	1:52.5493
(Germany) Michael Schumacher	1:49.2940

Final
Ferrari 360 Modena
(Finland) Heikki Kovalainen	1:45.3851
(Germany) Michael Schumacher	1:56.3805 (penalty)

=== Rallying Group ===
Quarter-finals
Citroën Xsara WRC
(Sweden) Mattias Ekström	1:48.7732
(United Kingdom) Colin McRae	1:58.7684 (penalty)
Citroën Xsara WRC
(France) Stéphane Sarrazin	1:47.6678
(Finland) Marcus Grönholm	1:46.0241
Peugeot 307 WRC
(United States) Jimmie Johnson	2:18.5842 (penalty)
(Germany) Armin Schwarz	1:50.7135
Peugeot 307 WRC
(France) Sébastien Loeb	1:46.4110
(Brazil) Tony Kanaan	1:54.8822 (penalty)

Semi-finals
Peugeot 307 WRC
(Sweden) Mattias Ekström	1:46.5447
(Finland) Marcus Grönholm	1:45.2022
Citroën Xsara WRC
(Germany) Armin Schwarz	1:47.3488
(France) Sébastien Loeb	1:45.6719

Final
Citroën Xsara WRC
(Finland) Marcus Grönholm	1:44.6967
(France) Sébastien Loeb	1:44.0306

=== Final ===
Driver 1	Time 1	Car	Driver 2	Time 2
(Finland) Heikki Kovalainen	1:42.2602	Peugeot 307 WRC	(France) Sébastien Loeb	1:43.0579
(Finland) Heikki Kovalainen	1:47.4383	Ferrari 360 Modena	(France) Sébastien Loeb	1:55.5842 (yellow card)

== World Champions Challenge ==
Driver 1	Time 1	Car	Driver 2	Time 2
(Germany) Michael Schumacher	1:46.7832	ROC Car	(France) Sébastien Loeb	1:46.9166
(Germany) Michael Schumacher	1:43.6134	ROC Car	(France) Sébastien Loeb	1:43.3109
(Germany) Michael Schumacher	1:41.8246	ROC Car	(France) Sébastien Loeb	1:42.7484

== The Nations Cup ==
Quarter-finals
France	2
Team Playstation France	0
Brazil	2
Germany	0
(United Kingdom) Great Britain	2
(United States) USA	1
Finland	2
Sweden	0

Semi-finals
France	2
Brazil	0
(United Kingdom) Great Britain	0
Finland	2

Final
France	3
Finland	2

=== Quarterfinals ===
Team 1	Time 1	Score	Team 2	Time 2	Car
France		2-0	Team PlayStation France		
Jean Alesi	1:50.3002	2-0	Sébastien Bourdais	1:51.2661	Ferrari 360 Modena
Sébastien Loeb	1:44.1263	2-0	Stéphane Sarrazin	1:47.5831	Peugeot 307 WRC
Brazil		2-0	Germany		
Felipe Massa	1:50.1074	2-0	Michael Schumacher	1:53.7634	Ferrari 360 Modena
Tony Kanaan	1:49.7582	2-0	Armin Schwarz	1:50.0430	Citroën Xsara WRC
(United Kingdom) Great Britain		2-1	(United States) USA		
David Coulthard	1:56.2226	2-1	Casey Mears	1:53.5186	Ferrari 360 Modena
Colin McRae	1:53.9080	2-1	Jimmie Johnson	2:15.4507	Citroën Xsara WRC
David Coulthard	1:44.7981	2-1	Casey Mears	1:45.0045	Ferrari 360 Modena
Finland		2-0	Sweden		
Heikki Kovalainen	1:46.6362	2-0	Kenny Bräck	1:51.3292	Ferrari 360 Modena
Marcus Grönholm	1:49.0011	2-0	Mattias Ekström	1:49.6333	Citroën Xsara WRC

=== Semifinals ===
Team 1	Time 1	Score	Team 2	Time 2	Car
France		2-0	Brazil		
Jean Alesi	1:41.7459	2-0	Felipe Massa	1:42.1434	ROC Car
Sébastien Loeb	1:47.0386	2-0	Tony Kanaan	1:51.4750	Citroën Xsara WRC
(United Kingdom) Great Britain		0-2	Finland		
David Coulthard	1:43.6151	0-2	Heikki Kovalainen	1:41.6780	ROC Car
Colin McRae	1:46.7798	0-2	Marcus Grönholm	1:43.8857	Peugeot 307 WRC

=== Final ===
Team 1	Time 1	Score	Team 2	Time 2	Car
France		3-2	Finland		
Jean Alesi	1:42.2688	3-2	Heikki Kovalainen	1:40.8116	ROC Car
Sébastien Loeb	1:44.8087	3-2	Marcus Grönholm	1:46.0491	Citroën Xsara WRC
Jean Alesi	1:57.9157 (penalty)	3-2	Heikki Kovalainen	1:46.8295	Ferrari 360 Modena
Sébastien Loeb	1:43.1858	3-2	Marcus Grönholm	1:44.3120	Peugeot 307 WRC
Jean Alesi	2:22.4891	3-2	Heikki Kovalainen	DNF	Ferrari 360 Modena
