= 2005 Race of Champions =

Motor racing competition

Seasons
- ← 2004 2006 →

Layout of 2005 Race of Champions

The 2005 Race of Champions took place on December 3 again at the Stade de France in Saint-Denis.

The individual event was won by Sébastien Loeb after Tom Kristensen crashed out of the final, and the Nations Cup event by Tom Kristensen and Mattias Ekström representing Scandinavia.

Changes from the past included a number of wild card drivers, the use of the Porsche 911 GT3 instead of the Ferrari 360 Modena and the introduction of the Renault Mégane Trophy alongside the Citroën Xsara WRC and now traditional "ROC Buggy" as competition cars.

== Participants ==
Team	Racing Driver	Rally Driver
France	Jean Alesi	Sébastien Loeb
United States	Jeff Gordon	Travis Pastrana
(United Kingdom) Great Britain	David Coulthard	Colin McRae
Finland	Heikki Kovalainen	Marcus Grönholm
Brazil	Felipe Massa	Nelson Piquet Jr.
Scandinavia	(Denmark) Tom Kristensen	(Sweden) Mattias Ekström
Benelux	(Netherlands) Christijan Albers	(Belgium) François Duval
Team PlayStation France	Sébastien Bourdais	Stéphane Peterhansel
Germany	Bernd Schneider	Armin Schwarz
Wildcard - ROC	(United Kingdom) Dan Wheldon	(Spain) Daniel Sordo

== Race of Champions ==
=== Racing Group ===
Eight drivers were randomly selected to compete in a first eliminatory round.

Round of 16
ROC Car
(United States) Jeff Gordon	2:05.0100
(Netherlands) Christijan Albers	+5s
ROC Car
(France) Sébastien Bourdais	1:54.8757
(United Kingdom) Dan Wheldon	1:58.6148
ROC Car
(Brazil) Nelson Piquet Jr.	1:52.9866
(Sweden) Mattias Ekström	1:54.2395
ROC Car
(United Kingdom) David Coulthard	1:53.1299
(Denmark) Tom Kristensen	1:52.7306

Quarter-finals
ROC Car
(Finland) Heikki Kovalainen	1:54.0386
(Germany) Bernd Schneider	1:57.8659
ROC Car
(Brazil) Felipe Massa	1:53.8102
(France) Jean Alesi	1:54.8608
ROC Car
(United States) Jeff Gordon	1:56.6810
(France) Sébastien Bourdais	1:56.9084
ROC Car
(Brazil) Nelson Piquet Jr.	1:55.2597
(Denmark) Tom Kristensen	1:54.7267

Semi-finals
Renault Mégane Trophy
(Finland) Heikki Kovalainen	1:47.9089
(Brazil) Felipe Massa	1:48.7390
Renault Mégane Trophy
(United States) Jeff Gordon	2:19.9630
(Denmark) Tom Kristensen	1:53.6579

Final
Renault Mégane Trophy
(Finland) Heikki Kovalainen	1:46.2349
(Denmark) Tom Kristensen	1:46.2282

=== Rallying Group ===
Quarter-finals
Porsche 911 GT3
(Finland) Marcus Grönholm	1:56.9406
(France) Stéphane Peterhansel	1:57.9043
Citroën Xsara WRC
(Belgium) François Duval	DNF
(Spain) Daniel Sordo	1:56.2400
Porsche 911 GT3
(United Kingdom) Colin McRae	1:52.8600
(Germany) Armin Schwarz	1:53.2096
Citroën Xsara WRC
(France) Sébastien Loeb	1:53.9708
(United States) Travis Pastrana	2:15.5375

Semi-finals
Citroën Xsara WRC
(Finland) Marcus Grönholm	1:54.0491
(Spain) Daniel Sordo	1:56.0218
Citroën Xsara WRC
(United Kingdom) Colin McRae	1:54.6190
(France) Sébastien Loeb	1:52.8756

Final
Citroën Xsara WRC
(Finland) Marcus Grönholm	1:54.1724
(France) Sébastien Loeb	1:51.7369

=== Final ===
Driver 1	Time 1	Car	Driver 2	Time 2
(Denmark) Tom Kristensen	1:45.7349	Renault Mégane Trophy	(France) Sébastien Loeb	1:45.7349
(Denmark) Tom Kristensen	DNF	Citroën Xsara WRC	(France) Sébastien Loeb	2:36.9539

== The Nations Cup ==
Round of 16
(Denmark) (Sweden) Scandinavia	2
Benelux	0

Quarter-finals
France	1
Team PlayStation France	2
(United Kingdom) Great Britain	2
Germany	0
Brazil	1
(United States) USA	2
Finland	0
(Denmark) (Sweden) Scandinavia	2

Semi-finals
Team PlayStation France	2
(United Kingdom) Great Britain	1
(United States) USA	0
(Denmark) (Sweden) Scandinavia	2

Final
Team PlayStation France	0
(Denmark) (Sweden) Scandinavia	2

=== Preliminary round ===
Team 1	Time 1	Score	Team 2	Time 2	Car
(Denmark) (Sweden) Scandinavia		2-0	Benelux		
Tom Kristensen	1:44.6670	2-0	Christijan Albers	1:45.9915	Renault Mégane Trophy
Mattias Ekström	1:46.5395	2-0	François Duval	1:48.6053	ROC Car

=== Quarterfinals ===
Team 1	Time 1	Score	Team 2	Time 2	Car
France		1-2	Team PlayStation France		
Jean Alesi	1:44.4043	1-2	Sébastien Bourdais	1:44.0267	Porsche 911 GT3
Sébastien Loeb	1:45.4355	1-2	Stéphane Peterhansel	1:47.2582	ROC Car
Jean Alesi	1:45.9329	1-2	Sébastien Bourdais	1:45.8009	ROC Car
(United Kingdom) Great Britain		2-0	Germany		
David Coulthard	1:42.3108	2-0	Bernd Schneider	1:43.2584	Renault Mégane Trophy
Colin McRae	1:45.6080	2-0	Armin Schwarz	1:46.7458	ROC Car
Brazil		1-2	United States		
Nelson Piquet Jr.	1:45.2953	1-2	Jeff Gordon	1:44.0434	Porsche 911 GT3
Felipe Massa	1:44.6443	1-2	Travis Pastrana	1:46.0117	ROC Car
Nelson Piquet Jr.	1:45.9035	1-2	Jeff Gordon	1:44.6499	ROC Car
Finland		0-2	(Denmark) (Sweden) Scandinavia		
Heikki Kovalainen	1:56.8013	0-2	Tom Kristensen	1:45.3118	Renault Mégane Trophy
Marcus Grönholm	1:46.3587	0-2	Mattias Ekström	1:43.7845	ROC Car

=== Semifinals ===
Team 1	Time 1	Score	Team 2	Time 2	Car
Team PlayStation France		2-1	(United Kingdom) Great Britain		
Sébastien Bourdais	1:43.4333	2-1	David Coulthard	1:43.9026	Porsche 911 GT3
Stéphane Peterhansel	1:52.4131	2-1	Colin McRae	1:48.0446	Citroën Xsara WRC
Sébastien Bourdais	1:44.7226	2-1	David Coulthard	1:44.7976	ROC Car
United States		0-2	(Denmark) (Sweden) Scandinavia		
Jeff Gordon	1:43.7200	0-2	Tom Kristensen	1:43.6386	Renault Mégane Trophy
Travis Pastrana	2:00.0571 (penalty)	0-2	Mattias Ekström	1:47.4469	Citroën Xsara WRC

=== Final ===
Team 1	Time 1	Score	Team 2	Time 2	Car
Team PlayStation France		0-2	(Denmark) (Sweden) Scandinavia		
Sébastien Bourdais	1:44.1617	0-2	Tom Kristensen	1:43.6516	Porsche 911 GT3
Stéphane Peterhansel	1:56.3242	0-2	Mattias Ekström	1:47.4428	Citroën Xsara WRC

== See also ==
- Race of Champions
