= 2006 Race of Champions =

Motor racing competition

Seasons
- ← 2005 2007 →

Layout of 2006 Race of Champions

The 2006 Race of Champions took place on 16 December at the Stade de France in Saint-Denis.

The Nations' Cup was competed first and the event was won by Finland, with Heikki Kovalainen winning over United States' Travis Pastrana on the final round. Kovalainen's teammate was the two-time World Rally Champion Marcus Grönholm, whereas Pastrana drove all the rounds for the US team, after both Jimmie Johnson and his replacement, Scott Speed, had to withdraw from competing due to injuries.

The individual event and the Henri Toivonen Memorial Trophy was won by Mattias Ekström of Sweden. He beat Kovalainen by 0.0002 seconds in the semi-finals, and defending champion, Sébastien Loeb of France, in the finals.

The cars used were the Citroën Xsara WRC, the Renault Mégane Trophy, the Porsche 996 GT3 RSR, the Aston Martin V8 Vantage Rally GT and the ubiquitous ROC Buggy.

== Participants ==
Team	Racing driver	Rally driver
Autosport England	James Thompson	(Guernsey) Andy Priaulx
Finland	Heikki Kovalainen	Marcus Grönholm
PlayStation France	Sébastien Bourdais	Sébastien Loeb
Auto Hebdo France	Yvan Muller	Stéphane Peterhansel
Germany	Bernd Schneider	Armin Schwarz
Scandinavia	(Denmark) Tom Kristensen	(Sweden) Mattias Ekström
F1 Racing Scotland	David Coulthard	Colin McRae
Spain	Nani Roma	Dani Sordo
United States	Travis Pastrana	

== Race of Champions ==
=== Racing Group ===
Round of 16
ROC Car
(Germany) Bernd Schneider	2:32.9344
(United Kingdom) James Thompson	2:35.6080

Quarter-finals
Aston Martin V8 Vantage Rally GT
(France) Sébastien Bourdais	2.23.5206
(United Kingdom) Andy Priaulx	2.26.1519
Aston Martin V8 Vantage Rally GT
(France) Yvan Muller	2.23.0462
(United Kingdom) David Coulthard	2.25.6639
Aston Martin V8 Vantage Rally GT
(Sweden) Mattias Ekström	2.19.9117
(Germany) Bernd Schneider	2.21.7284
Aston Martin V8 Vantage Rally GT
(Denmark) Tom Kristensen	2.23.2352
(Finland) Heikki Kovalainen	2.23.1061

Semi-finals
Renault Mégane Trophy
(France) Sébastien Bourdais	2.15.9999
(France) Yvan Muller	2.16.0170
Renault Mégane Trophy
(Sweden) Mattias Ekström	2.14.6003
(Finland) Heikki Kovalainen	2.14.6005

Final
Renault Mégane Trophy
(France) Sébastien Bourdais	2.15.1278
(Sweden) Mattias Ekström	2.12.0659

=== Rallying Group ===
Quarter-finals
Porsche 996 GT3 RSR
(France) Sébastien Loeb	2:18.9701
(Spain) Nani Roma	2:20.4327
Porsche 996 GT3 RSR
(France) Stéphane Peterhansel	2:40.3303
(United States) Travis Pastrana	2:29.2107
Porsche 996 GT3 RSR
(Spain) Dani Sordo	2:16.8528
(Germany) Armin Schwarz	2:26.9785
Porsche 996 GT3 RSR
(United Kingdom) Colin McRae	2:15.9343
(Finland) Marcus Grönholm	2:19.0594

Semi-finals
Citroën Xsara WRC
(France) Sébastien Loeb	2:18.8750
(United States) Travis Pastrana	2:22.4944
Citroën Xsara WRC
(Spain) Dani Sordo	2:21.0805
(United Kingdom) Colin McRae	2:20.2493

Final
Citroën Xsara WRC
(France) Sébastien Loeb	2:24.5987
(United Kingdom) Colin McRae	2:25.5745

=== Final ===
Driver 1	Time 1	Car	Driver 2	Time 2
(Sweden) Mattias Ekström	2:21.2617	Citroën Xsara WRC	(France) Sébastien Loeb	2:21.4500
(Sweden) Mattias Ekström	2:16.1273	Renault Mégane Trophy	(France) Sébastien Loeb	2:22.4954

== The Nations Cup ==
Round of 16
PlayStation France	2
Auto Hebdo France	0

Quarter-finals
Germany	1
(United States) USA	2
F1 Racing Scotland	2
Autosport England	1
Finland	2
(Denmark) (Sweden) Scandinavia	1
Spain	0
PlayStation France	2

Semi-finals
(United States) USA	2
F1 Racing Scotland	1
Finland	2
PlayStation France	1

Final
(United States) USA	1
Finland	2

=== Preliminary Round ===
Team 1	Time 1	Score	Team 2	Time 2	Car
PlayStation France		2-0	Auto Hebdo France		
Sébastien Bourdais	2:29.1005	2-0	Yvan Muller	2:29.7141	Porsche 996 GT3 RSR
Sébastien Loeb	2:33.3325	2-0	Stéphane Peterhansel	2:35.8314	Aston Martin V8 Vantage Rally GT

=== Quarterfinals ===
Team 1	Time 1	Score	Team 2	Time 2	Car
Germany		1-2	(United States) USA		
Bernd Schneider	2:37.6729	1-2	Travis Pastrana	2:30.4220	Porsche 996 GT3 RSR
Armin Schwarz	2:33.2329	1-2	Travis Pastrana	2:37.1421	Aston Martin V8 Vantage Rally GT
Bernd Schneider	2:47.5800	1-2	Travis Pastrana	2:43.6257	ROC Car
F1 Racing Scotland		2-1	Autosport England		
David Coulthard	2:24.8384	2-1	James Thompson	2:28.6790	Porsche 996 GT3 RSR
Colin McRae	2:31.8388	2-1	Andy Priaulx	2:31.4565	Aston Martin V8 Vantage Rally GT
David Coulthard	2:41.6900	2-1	James Thompson	2:47.4845	ROC Car
Finland		2-1	(Denmark) (Sweden) Scandinavia		
Heikki Kovalainen	2:24.1735	2-1	Tom Kristensen	2:27.2222	Porsche 996 GT3 RSR
Marcus Grönholm	2:31.3845	2-1	Mattias Ekström	2:26.9936	Aston Martin V8 Vantage Rally GT
Heikki Kovalainen	2:35.3213	2-1	Tom Kristensen	2:39.3472	ROC Car
Spain		0-2	PlayStation France		
Nani Roma	2:36.5373	0-2	Sébastien Bourdais	2:20.5726	Porsche 996 GT3 RSR
Dani Sordo	2:28.7845	0-2	Sébastien Loeb	2:24.2804	Aston Martin V8 Vantage Rally GT

=== Semifinals ===
Team 1	Time 1	Score	Team 2	Time 2	Car
(United States) USA		2-1	F1 Racing Scotland		
Travis Pastrana	3:07.1516	2-1	David Coulthard	2:32.1668	Renault Mégane Trophy
Travis Pastrana	2:29.3571	2-1	Colin McRae	2:35.3752	Citroën Xsara WRC
Travis Pastrana	2:34.4833	2-1	David Coulthard	2:34.9779	ROC Car
Finland		2-1	PlayStation France		
Heikki Kovalainen	2:25.3105	2-1	Sébastien Bourdais	2:53.0120	Renault Mégane Trophy
Marcus Grönholm	2:24.6853	2-1	Sébastien Loeb	2:22.8908	Citroën Xsara WRC
Heikki Kovalainen	2:28.9772	2-1	Sébastien Bourdais	2:32.7080	ROC Car

=== Final ===
Team 1	Time 1	Score	Team 2	Time 2	Car
(United States) USA		1-2	Finland		
Travis Pastrana	2:56.4534	1-2	Heikki Kovalainen	2:21.1936	Renault Mégane Trophy
Travis Pastrana	2:25.0260	1-2	Marcus Grönholm	2:28.8001	Citroën Xsara WRC
Travis Pastrana	2:32.1670	1-2	Heikki Kovalainen	2:28.7805	ROC Car

== See also ==
- Race of Champions
