= 2007 Race of Champions =

Motor racing competition

Seasons
- ← 2006 2008 →

Layout of 2007 Race of Champions

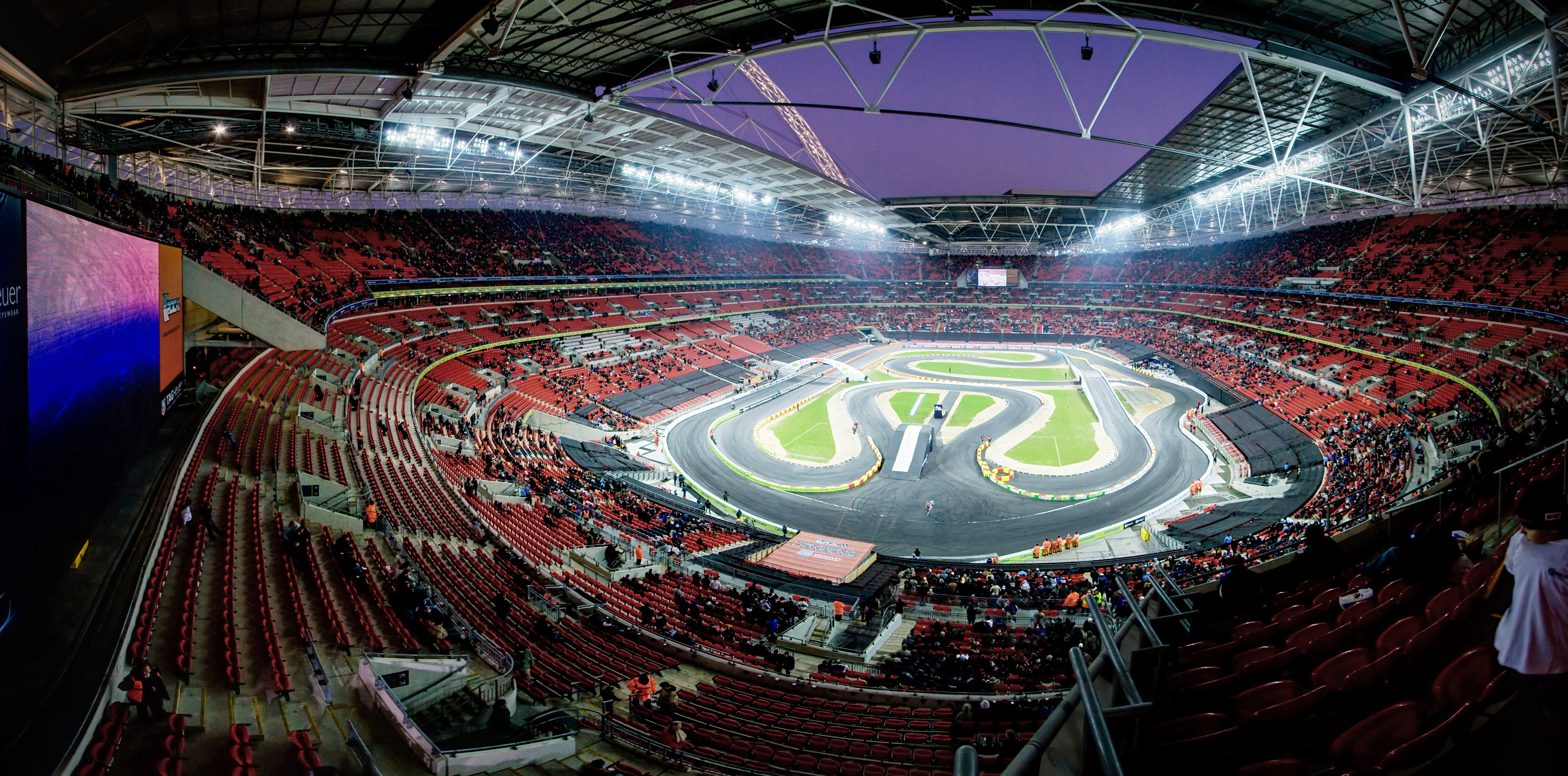
2007 Race of Champions at Wembley Stadium.

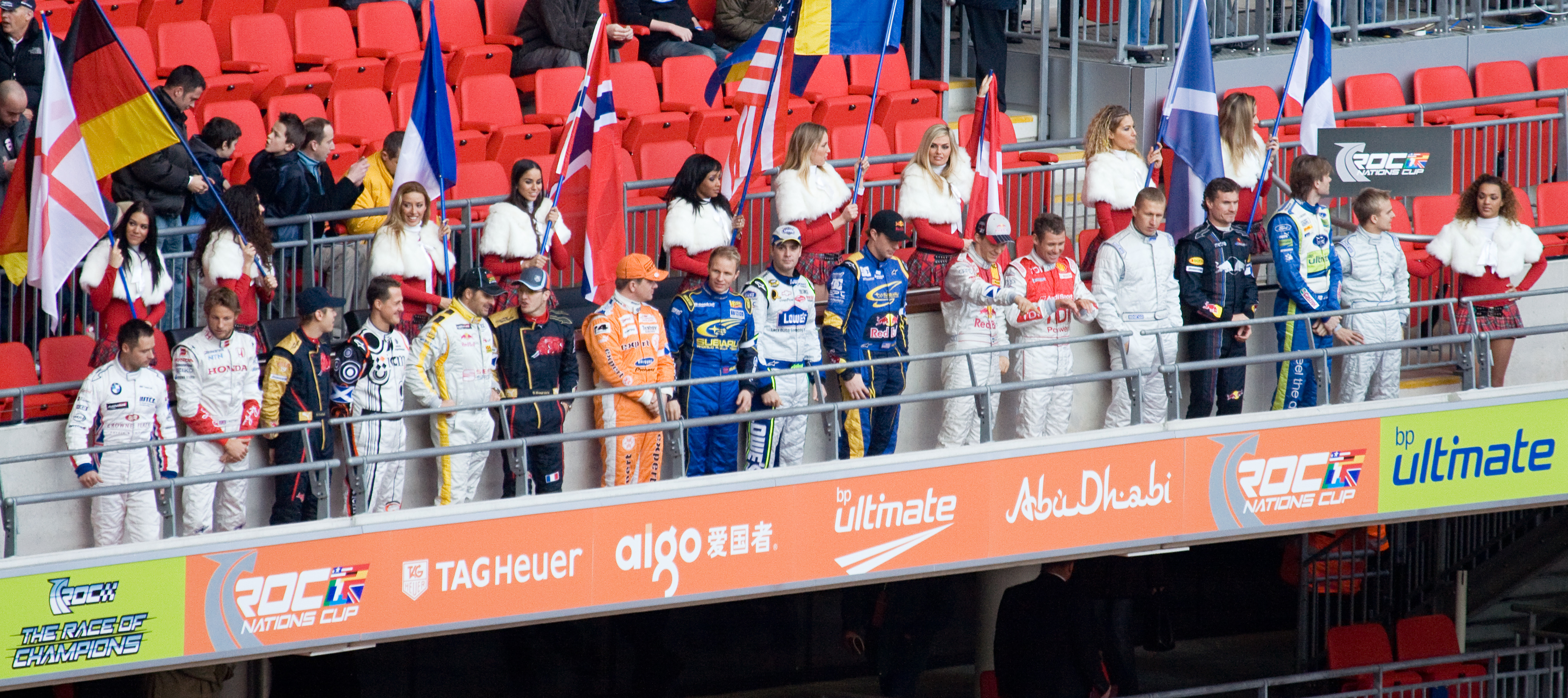
The 16 competitors line up before the start of the event.

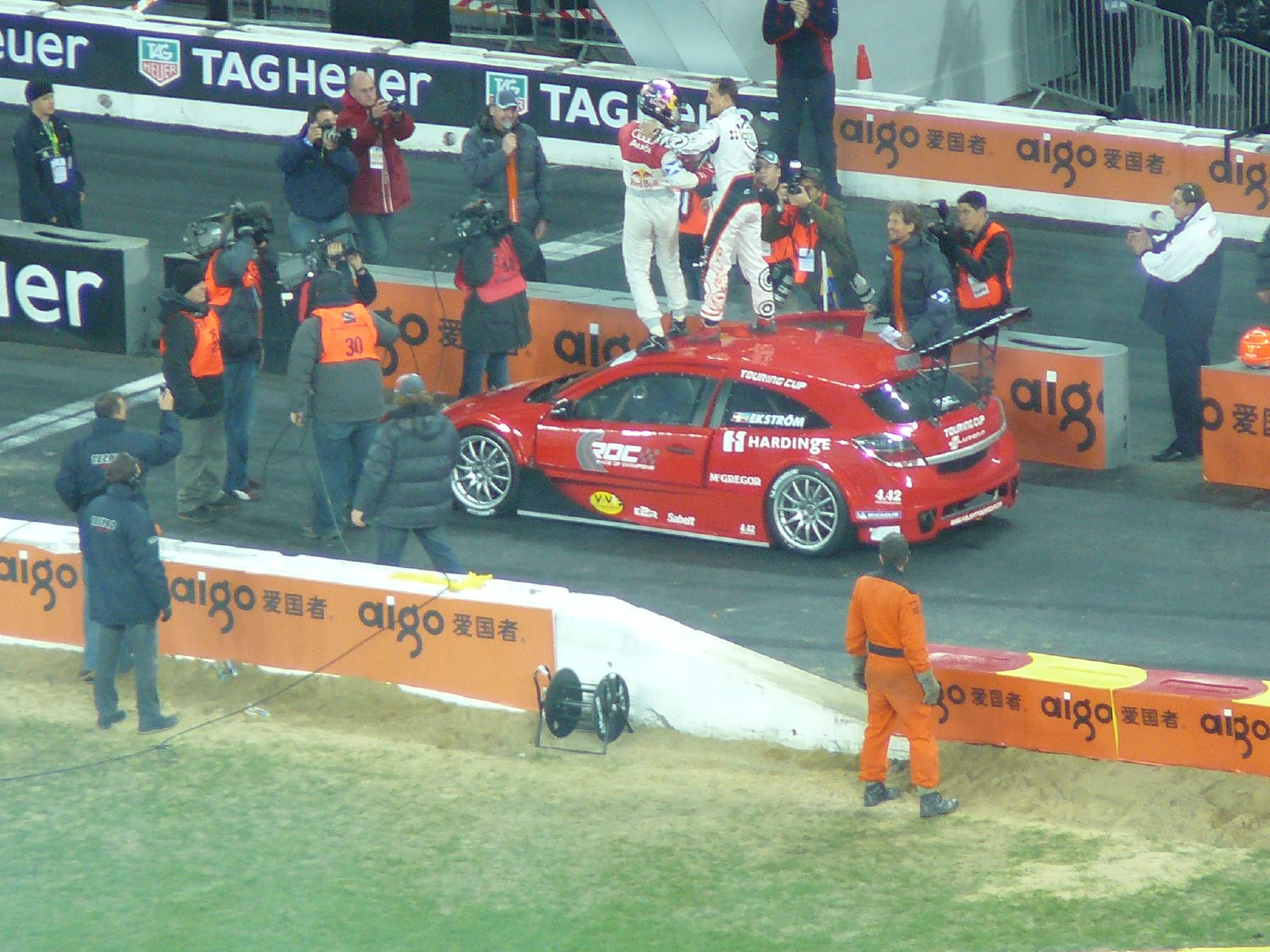
Michael Schumacher congratulates Mattias Ekström for his second RoC title.

The 2007 Race of Champions took place on December 16 at the Wembley Stadium. Michael Schumacher and Sebastian Vettel of the German team beat Finland to the Nation's Cup, however Mattias Ekström of Sweden and the Scandinavian team won the Driver's Cup after beating Schumacher in the three-heat final.

The event itself was overshadowed by the recent death of former World Rally Champion Colin McRae who died in a helicopter accident on the 15 September. He was due to represent Scotland alongside David Coulthard. Colin's position was filled by his rally driver brother Alister McRae.

== Participants ==
Team	Drivers	2007 series
Autosport England	Jenson Button	Formula One
Autosport England	Andy Priaulx	WTCC
Finland	Marcus Grönholm	WRC
Finland	Heikki Kovalainen	Formula One
France	Sébastien Bourdais	Champ Car
France	Yvan Muller	WTCC
Germany	Michael Schumacher	none
Germany	Sebastian Vettel	Formula One
Norway	Henning Solberg	WRC
Norway	Petter Solberg	WRC
(Denmark) (Sweden) Scandinavia	Mattias Ekström	DTM
(Denmark) (Sweden) Scandinavia	Tom Kristensen	DTM
F1 Racing Scotland	David Coulthard	Formula One
F1 Racing Scotland	Alister McRae	WRC
United States	Jimmie Johnson	NASCAR
United States	Travis Pastrana	X Games & Rally America

== Cars ==
- Abarth Grande Punto S2000
- Aston Martin Vantage N24
- Ford Focus RS WRC
- ROC Car
- Solution F Prototype

== Driver's Cup ==
Round of 16
Solution F Prototype
(Germany) Michael Schumacher	1:50.1346
(Norway) Henning Solberg	1:52.2629
ROC Car
(United Kingdom) Jenson Button	1:52.3686
(United Kingdom) Alister McRae	1:54.8733
Solution F Prototype
(United States) Jimmie Johnson	1:49.6683
(France) Sébastien Bourdais	1:48.9771
ROC Car
(United Kingdom) David Coulthard	1:50.6241
(Norway) Petter Solberg	2:06.7098
Solution F Prototype
(Finland) Heikki Kovalainen	1:50.2973
(Germany) Sebastian Vettel	1:51.1478
ROC Car
(United Kingdom) Andy Priaulx	1:49.6485
(France) Yvan Muller	1:51.6445
Solution F Prototype
(Sweden) Mattias Ekström	1:50.0963
(Denmark) Tom Kristensen	1:51.1692
ROC Car
(Finland) Marcus Grönholm	1:56.8349
(United States) Travis Pastrana	1:55.2582

Quarter-finals
ROC Car
(Germany) Michael Schumacher	1:48.0203
(United Kingdom) Jenson Button	1:49.1543
Solution F Prototype
(France) Sébastien Bourdais	1:50.4782
(United Kingdom) David Coulthard	1:51.4879
Aston Martin Vantage N24
(Finland) Heikki Kovalainen	1:53.7035
(United Kingdom) Andy Priaulx	1:53.6036
Ford Focus RS WRC
(Sweden) Mattias Ekström	1:54.3696
(United States) Travis Pastrana	1:57.1632

Semi-finals
ROC Car
(Germany) Michael Schumacher	1:47.9105
(France) Sébastien Bourdais	1:48.9747
Solution F Prototype
(United Kingdom) Andy Priaulx	DNF
(Sweden) Mattias Ekström	1:49.3806

Final
(Germany) Michael Schumacher	1
(Sweden) Mattias Ekström	2

=== Final ===
Driver 1	Time 1	Car	Driver 2	Time 2
(Germany) Michael Schumacher	1:49.8010	Solution F Prototype	(Sweden) Mattias Ekström	1:48.1945
(Germany) Michael Schumacher	1:47.0026	ROC Car	(Sweden) Mattias Ekström	1:47.9687
(Germany) Michael Schumacher	DNF	Solution F Prototype	(Sweden) Mattias Ekström	1:47.3191

== Nations Cup ==
Quarter-finals
France	1
Norway	2
Finland	2
(Denmark) (Sweden) Scandinavia	0
F1 Racing Scotland	0
Autosport England	2
United States	1
Germany	2

Semi-finals
Norway	0
Finland	2
Autosport England	0
Germany	2

Final
Germany	2
Finland	1

=== Quarterfinals ===
Team 1	Time 1	Score	Team 2	Time 2	Car
France		1–2	Norway		
Sébastien Bourdais	1:51.6054	1–2	Henning Solberg	1:55.1300	Solution F Prototype
Yvan Muller	1:55.2650	1–2	Petter Solberg	1:55.0342	Ford Focus RS WRC
Sébastien Bourdais	DNF	1–2	Petter Solberg	1:56.2768	ROC Car
Finland		2–0	(Denmark) (Sweden) Scandinavia		
Heikki Kovalainen	1:50.9680	2–0	Tom Kristensen	1:51.7954	Solution F Prototype
Marcus Grönholm	1:51.3012	2–0	Mattias Ekström	1:52.4360	Ford Focus RS WRC
F1 Racing Scotland		0–2	Autosport England		
David Coulthard	2:04.5674	0–2	Jenson Button	2:02.9926	Abarth Grande Punto S2000
Alister McRae	1:59.2322	0–2	Andy Priaulx	1:53.9674	Aston Martin Vantage N24
(United States) USA		1–2	Germany		
Jimmie Johnson	2:04.5386	1–2	Michael Schumacher	2:01.6595	Abarth Grande Punto S2000
Travis Pastrana	1:53.2361	1–2	Sebastian Vettel	1:54.6346	Aston Martin Vantage N24
Travis Pastrana	1:55.6721	1–2	Michael Schumacher	1:51.4714	ROC Car

=== Semifinals ===
Team 1	Time 1	Score	Team 2	Time 2	Car
Norway		0–2	Finland		
Henning Solberg	2:02.4305	0–2	Heikki Kovalainen	2:01.0103	Abarth Grande Punto S2000
Petter Solberg	1:54.1627	0–2	Marcus Grönholm	1:52.1561	Ford Focus RS WRC
Autosport England		0–2	Germany		
Jenson Button	1:50.1701	0–2	Michael Schumacher	1:49.7097	Solution F Prototype
Andy Priaulx	1:52.3379	0–2	Sebastian Vettel	1:51.7319	Ford Focus RS WRC

=== Final ===
Team 1	Time 1	Score	Team 2	Time 2	Car
Germany		2–1	Finland		
Michael Schumacher	DNF	2–1	Heikki Kovalainen	DNF	Abarth Grande Punto S2000
Sebastian Vettel	1:50.8516	2–1	Marcus Grönholm	1:51.3727	Ford Focus RS WRC
Sebastian Vettel	1:49.6363	2–1	Heikki Kovalainen	1:51.1503	ROC Car

== See also ==
- Race of Champions
