= Heikki Kovalainen =

Finnish racing and rally driver (born 1981)

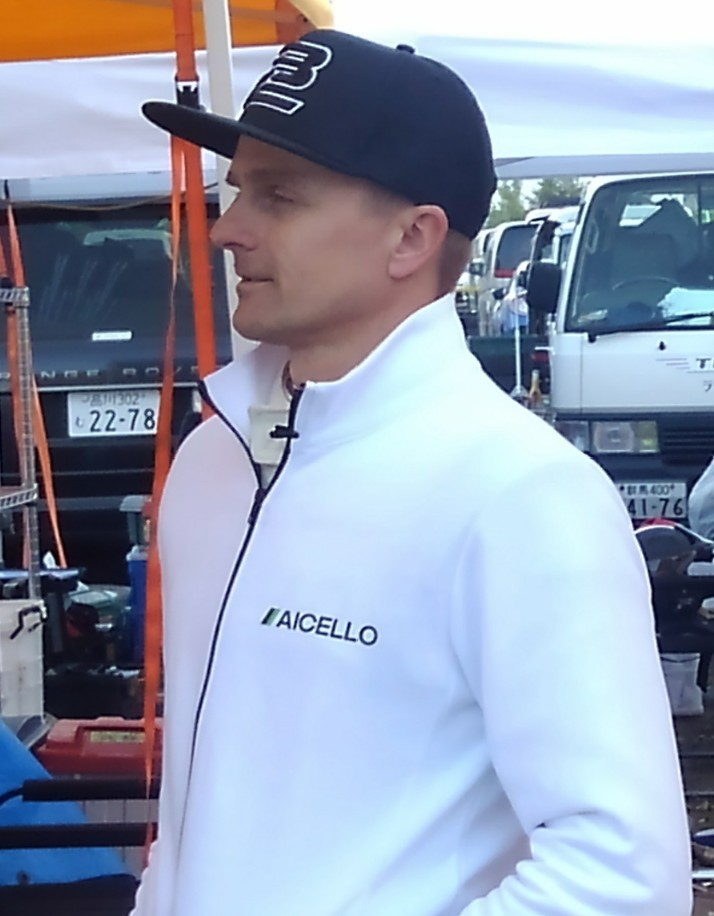
- Kovalainen in 2019
- Born: Heikki Johannes Kovalainen; 19 October 1981 (age 45); Suomussalmi, Kainuu, Finland
- Spouse: Catherine Hyde (m. 2014)
- Children: 1
- Categorisation: FIA Platinum

Formula One World Championship career
- Nationality: (Finland) Finnish
- Active years: 2007–2013
- Team(s): Renault, McLaren, Team Lotus, Caterham, Lotus
- Entries: 112 (111 starts)
- Championships: 0
- Wins: 1
- Podiums: 4
- Career points: 105
- Pole positions: 1
- Fastest laps: 2
- First entry: 2007 Australian Grand Prix
- First win: 2008 Hungarian Grand Prix
- Last entry: 2013 Brazilian Grand Prix

Super GT career
- Years active: 2015–2021
- Teams: SARD
- Starts: 54
- Championships: 1 (2016)
- Wins: 5
- Podiums: 10
- Poles: 2
- Fastest laps: 2
- Best finish: 1st in 2016 (GT500)

World Rally Championship record
- Years active: 2022–2023
- Rallies: 4
- Championships: 0
- Rally wins: 0
- Podiums: 0
- Total points: 1
- First rally: 2022 Rally Japan
- Last rally: 2025 Rally Japan

Heikki Johannes Kovalainen (Finnish pronunciation: [ˈhei̯kːi ˈkoʋɑlɑi̯nen]; born 19 October 1981) is a Finnish racing and rally driver, who competed in Formula One from 2007 to 2013. Kovalainen won the 2008 Hungarian Grand Prix with McLaren. In sportscar racing, Kovalainen won Super GT in 2016 with SARD.

Kovalainen was supported by the Renault Driver Development programme early in his racing career, during which he won the World Series by Nissan championship and finished runner-up in the GP2 series. Renault signed him on as a full-time Formula One test driver for 2006, and then promoted him to a race seat for 2007. He gained his first podium by finishing second in the Japanese Grand Prix that year.

Kovalainen moved to McLaren for the 2008 season, where he partnered Lewis Hamilton. His second season in Formula One saw him achieve his first pole position at Silverstone and his first victory at the Hungaroring, becoming the 100th driver to win a Formula One Grand Prix. He remained with the team for the 2009 season.

In 2010, Kovalainen moved to the newly created Team Lotus where he also remained for 2011 and 2012, with the team renamed Caterham F1 for 2012, Kovalainen's last full season in Formula One. Although he didn't score points in the uncompetitive cars, he earned respect for outperforming drivers who were racing in similarly uncompetitive cars. Kovalainen competed in the last two races of the 2013 season for Lotus F1 as a short-notice stand-in for regular driver Kimi Räikkönen.

In 2015, Kovalainen moved to Japan to compete in Super GT in the GT500 class with Team SARD. He won the championship in his second season in the series in 2016 alongside co-driver Kohei Hirate.

== Early career ==
=== Karting (1991–2000) ===
Born in Suomussalmi, Finland, Kovalainen's career began in kart racing, much like that of many other race car drivers. He competed in karting from 1991 to 2000, during which time he finished runner-up in the Finnish Formula A championship in 1999 and 2000. In 2000, he won the Nordic championship and the Paris-Bercy Elf Masters event, as well as finished third in the World Formula Super A Championship, leading him to be elected as the Finnish Kart Driver of the Year.

=== Formula Renault (2001) ===
Kovalainen began his car racing career in the British Formula Renault Championship, which fellow Finn Kimi Räikkönen had won in 2000 before moving straight into Formula One with Sauber. Kovalainen's apprenticeship in the junior categories of motor sport was more conventional, but he used Renault power at every step along the way. He finished fourth in the championship with two wins, two pole positions, five podiums and three fastest laps, earning the Rookie of the Year award. He also took part in the Formula Three Macau Grand Prix, where he finished eighth.

=== Formula Three (2002) ===
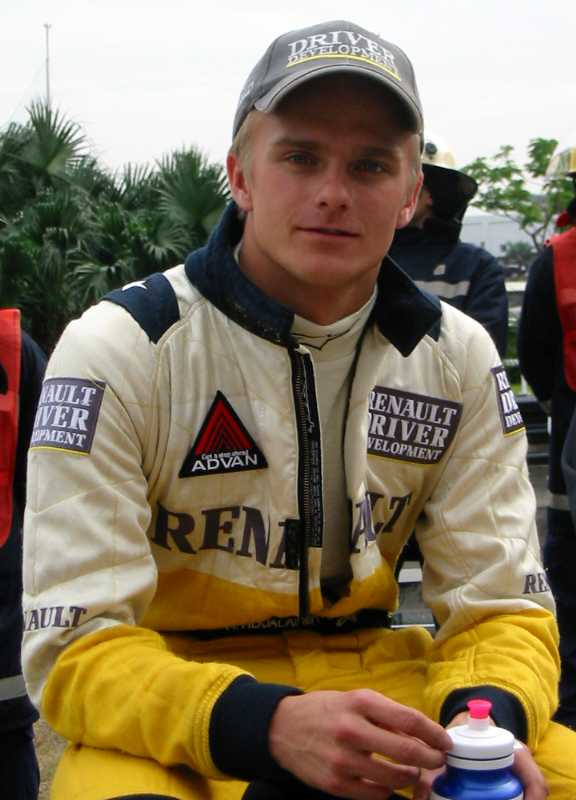
Kovalainen at the 2002 Macau Grand Prix

Kovalainen attracted the support of the Renault Driver Development programme and in 2002 moved up to the British Formula 3 Championship with Fortec Motorsport who used Renault engines. He became one of the most competitive drivers on the grid by the second half of the season and all five of his wins came in the final nine races. With three pole positions and three fastest laps, Kovalainen finished third overall in the championship behind Robbie Kerr and James Courtney and he was again Rookie of the Year.

Kovalainen also demonstrated strong form in the international non-championship rounds, with second place in Macau and fourth place at the Marlboro Masters at Zandvoort.

=== World Series by Nissan (2003–2004) ===
Kovalainen moved into the Renault-owned World Series by Nissan in 2003 – but faced a tough teammate at the Gabord team in Franck Montagny. Montagny had already spent two seasons in the World Series and had won the championship in 2001. Montagny won the 2003 title with nine wins to Kovalainen's one.

Kovalainen continued in the series in 2004, but moved to Pons Racing, where he won the championship ahead of Tiago Monteiro, with 192 points and six wins. With Kimi Räikkönen finishing seventh in Formula One and Marcus Grönholm fifth in the World Rally Championship, Kovalainen received the Finnish Driver of the Year award.

=== GP2 Series (2005) ===
In 2005, Kovalainen entered the GP2 Series, the new 'feeder' series for F1 and the successor to Formula 3000. Driving for the Arden International team, Kovalainen began the season with strong results by winning the first round of the championship in Imola and then finishing third in the sprint race. In Barcelona, he scored his third consecutive podium, but in the sprint race, his car stalled on the grid. He dominated the race in Monaco by claiming pole position, leading the race for the first 21 laps and clocking the fastest lap of the race. Problems during his pitstop, however, dropped him down to fifth. At the Nürburgring, he gave his best performance yet, by winning the race from 17th on the grid. In the sprint race, José María López caused a collision which forced Kovalainen to retire. At Magny-Cours, he won again from fourth on the grid, and came third in the sprint race.

At this point in the season, however, a resurgent Nico Rosberg with his ART Grand Prix team seemed to find more speed and began scoring victories, emerging as Kovalainen's main rival for the championship. Kovalainen and Arden fought back, scoring podiums and points positions in Silverstone, Hockenheim and Hungaroring, but were unable to find the necessary speed to beat Rosberg. In Istanbul's feature race Kovalainen finished tenth due to engine problems, but in the sprint race held in wet conditions he returned to his winning ways. At Monza Arden were fast again, and Kovalainen snatched his second pole of the season and won the feature race. In the sprint race he could only manage fifth position, however, and this meant that with four races left in the season, Kovalainen was leading Rosberg by only four points.

After a chaotic weekend at Spa affected by rain and Safety Cars, Rosberg took the lead from Kovalainen. In the final two rounds in Bahrain, Rosberg and ART seemed to be unmatched again, and he secured the championship by winning the feature race with Kovalainen finishing third. Retiring from the last sprint race, Kovalainen finished runner-up in the series, 15 points adrift.

== Formula One ==
=== Renault (2004–2007) ===
==== 2004–2006 ====
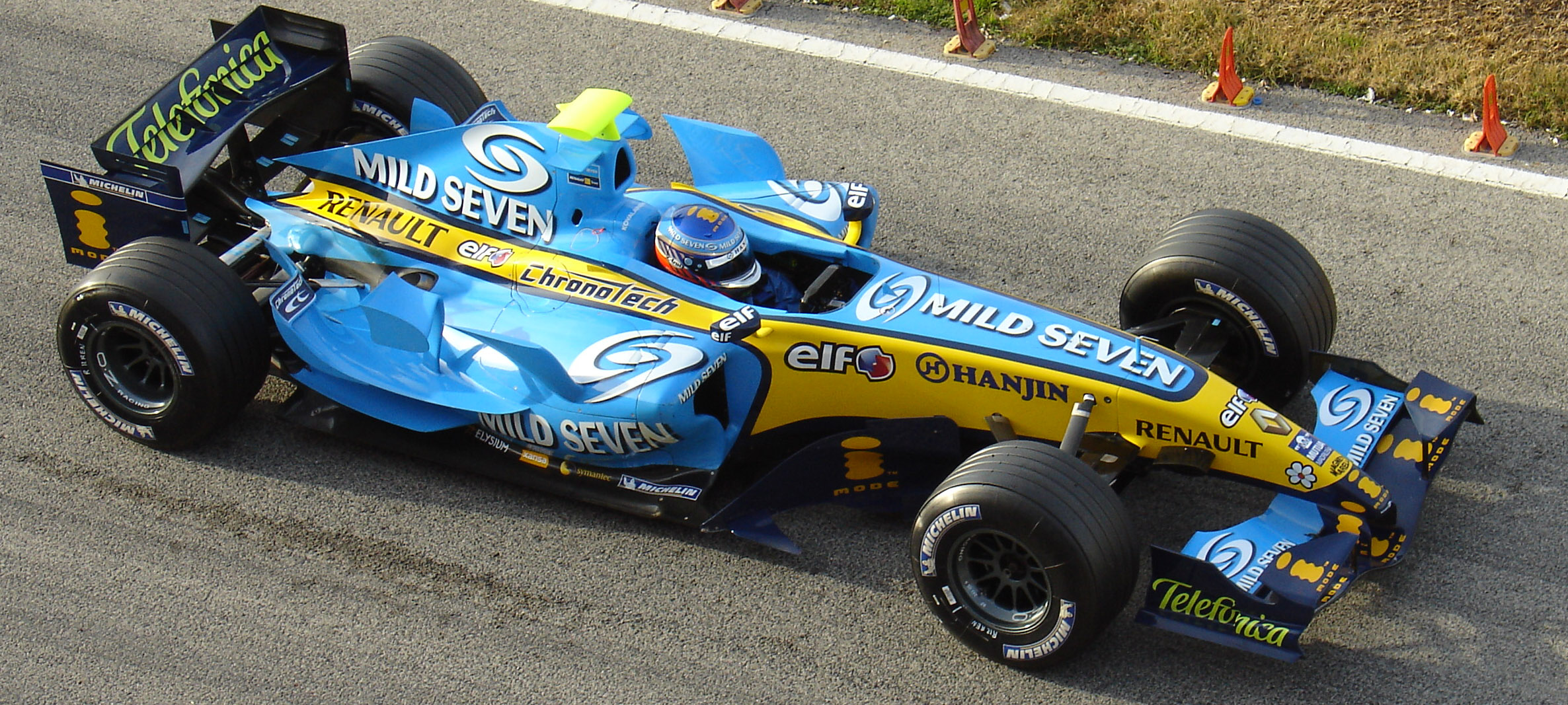
Kovalainen testing for Renault F1 in 2006, at Valencia

Kovalainen, Franck Montagny and José María López tested the Renault R23B F1 car at Barcelona in December 2003. Kovalainen also tested for Minardi, but Renault made him second test driver alongside Montagny for 2004.

Kovalainen was promoted in Montagny's place at the end of 2005 and spent the 2006 season in a full-time testing role, logging over 28,000 km of testing.

Renault's lead driver Fernando Alonso had signed for McLaren for the 2007 season, and Renault elected to promote Kovalainen in his place, which they confirmed on 6 September 2006. Team boss Flavio Briatore said: "With Kovalainen, I hope to find the anti-Alonso."

==== 2007 ====
Kovalainen made his race debut at the Australian Grand Prix. His season got off to a rough start; he made several mistakes during the race, finishing tenth. Flavio Briatore felt it was a disappointing debut for the young Finn and hoped the real Kovalainen would show up next time.

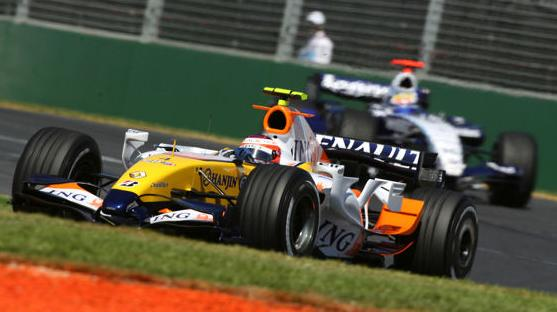
Kovalainen at the 2007 Australian Grand Prix, leading Nico Rosberg

Kovalainen scored his first World Championship point in his second Grand Prix at Sepang, Malaysia, and followed this with a ninth place in Bahrain. He then secured seventh place in Barcelona, outperforming teammate Giancarlo Fisichella, but finished down the order in Monaco, in 13th.

In Canada, Kovalainen made mistakes throughout practice, including one at the exit of turn 7, and hit the barrier. He crashed at the first chicane in qualifying, and damaged his rear wing significantly, and failed to make it through to the second qualifying session. In the race he made progress early on, and then halted. He had luck with the strategy and the Safety Car, and a podium was within his grasp, but he could not find a way past Alexander Wurz of Williams, who had also started towards the rear of the pack. Kovalainen was pulling away from the Ferrari of Kimi Räikkönen in the closing stages, which was a real confidence booster for the team.

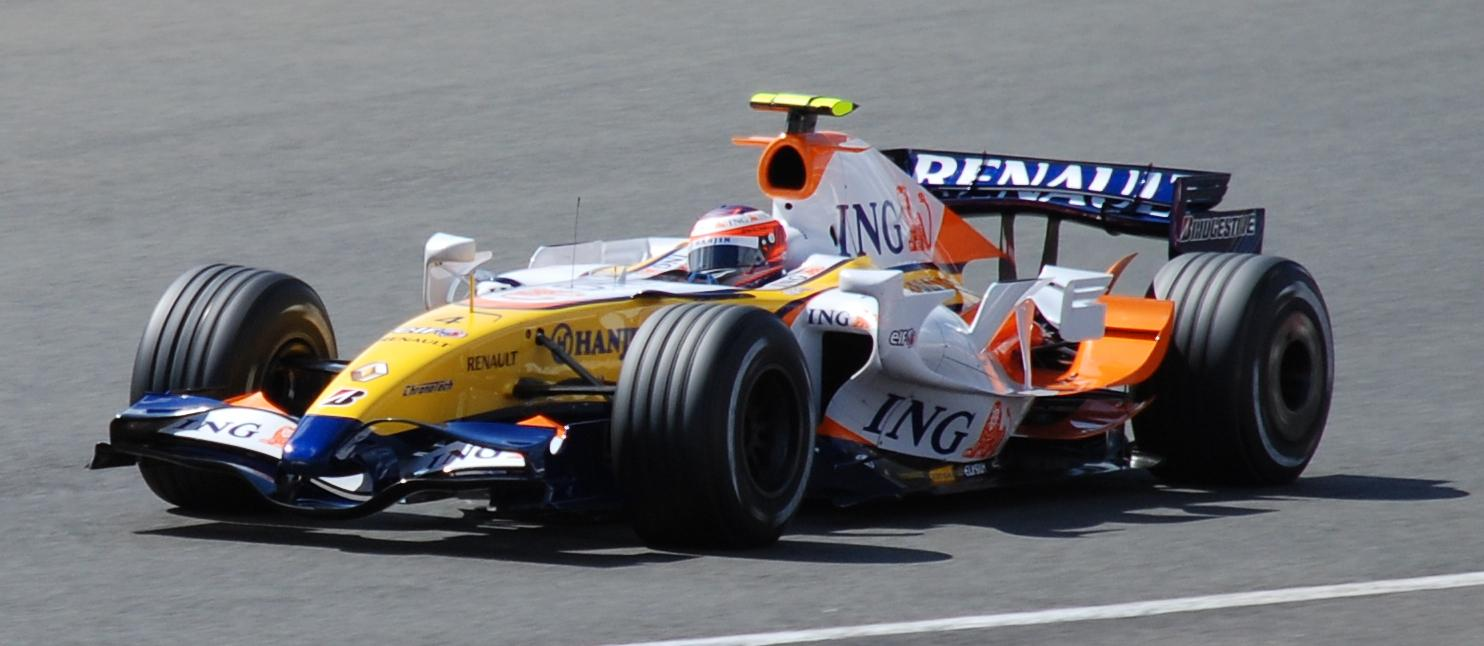
Kovalainen at the 2007 British Grand Prix

In the United States Grand Prix at Indianapolis, Kovalainen qualified in sixth position, and a good start saw him go past Räikkönen into fifth place. He held Räikkönen off, and led the race at the end of his first stint when the cars ahead of him made their pit stops. He re-joined behind Räikkönen and looked comfortable in sixth place until Nick Heidfeld's BMW Sauber broke down in front of him, and thus, Kovalainen finished fifth, while teammate Fisichella failed to score points.

The second half of the European season failed to produce equally strong results, but it did keep the points tally ticking over. During the French Grand Prix at Magny-Cours, Kovalainen was battling with Fisichella until the sharp Adelaide hairpin, when Jarno Trulli's Toyota made an optimistic lunge up the inside of Kovalainen which wrecked both drivers' races. Kovalainen had to pit for repairs and eventually finished 15th. Seventh place at the British Grand Prix was no disaster, with Fisichella finishing behind him.

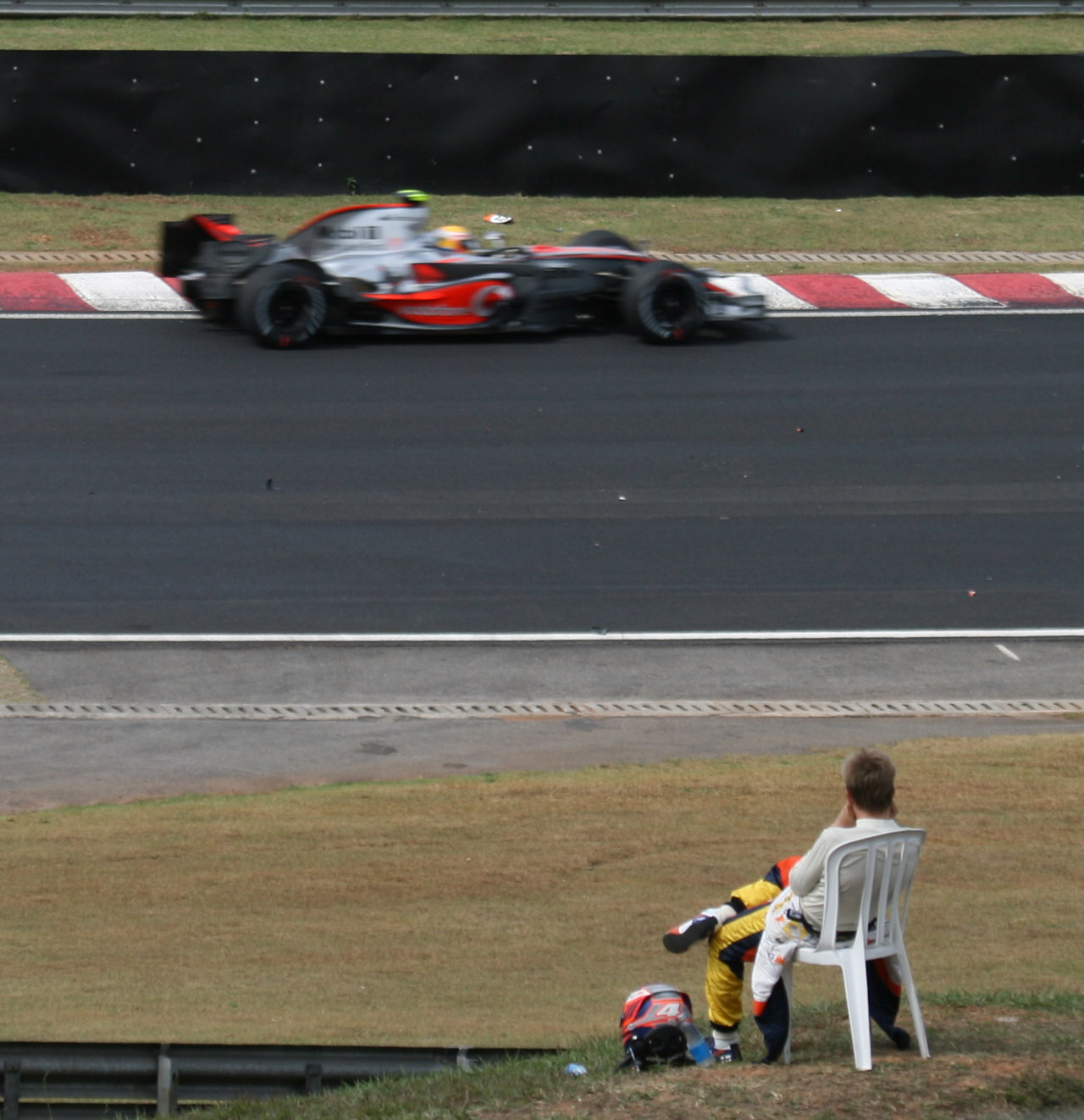
Kovalainen had time to watch the Brazilian Grand Prix after his only retirement of the season.

Kovalainen scored a point at both the Nürburgring and the Hungaroring, and scored three more in Turkey, with Kovalainen coming ahead of Robert Kubica. Kovalainen again led the Grand Prix when cars ahead of him made their pit stops. Seventh place at Monza was a fair result. The team took a gamble in the next race at Spa-Francorchamps, with Kovalainen on a one-stop strategy while his challengers for the rear end of the points were all on two-stop strategies, which included the BMW's of Heidfeld and Kubica (who was docked ten places down the grid due to an engine change), Nico Rosberg and Mark Webber. A good start from Kovalainen saw him become a mobile chicane for all of them except Webber. The gamble did not pay off, although Kovalainen held off Kubica in the closing stages to secure the final points position. Better was to come at the Japanese Grand Prix at Fuji Speedway, where, despite not making it through to the final qualifying session, Kovalainen raced well. While most of his rivals got into trouble one way or another in the hazardous wet conditions, Kovalainen did not and held off Kimi Räikkönen in the closing laps to take second place and his first podium in Formula One.

After finishing ninth in the Chinese Grand Prix, Kovalainen made a mistake in qualifying in Brazil and was left 17th on the grid. At the start of the race Ralf Schumacher collided with Kovalainen, forcing him to pit. His teammate Fisichella was involved in a collision with Sakon Yamamoto. On lap 36 he felt a vibration at the left rear, and suddenly something on the rear suspension snapped, launching Kovalainen into the barriers. The retirement, possibly caused by damage from the collision with Schumacher, was his first of the season, meaning he lost the once-in-a-lifetime opportunity of becoming the first driver to finish all of the races in his first season. At the time, he shared the record for most consecutive finishes from start of career with Tiago Monteiro, both having finished 16 races, until Max Chilton broke the record by finishing his first 25 races in 2013 and 2014.

=== McLaren (2008–2009) ===
At the end of the 2007 season Fernando Alonso returned to Renault, and Kovalainen was left with offers from Toyota and McLaren. On 14 December 2007 it was confirmed that Kovalainen would replace Alonso once again and drive for McLaren Mercedes in 2008, alongside Lewis Hamilton. Kovalainen joined Keke Rosberg, Mika Häkkinen and Kimi Räikkönen as Finnish drivers that have driven for McLaren.

==== 2008: Only Grand Prix win ====
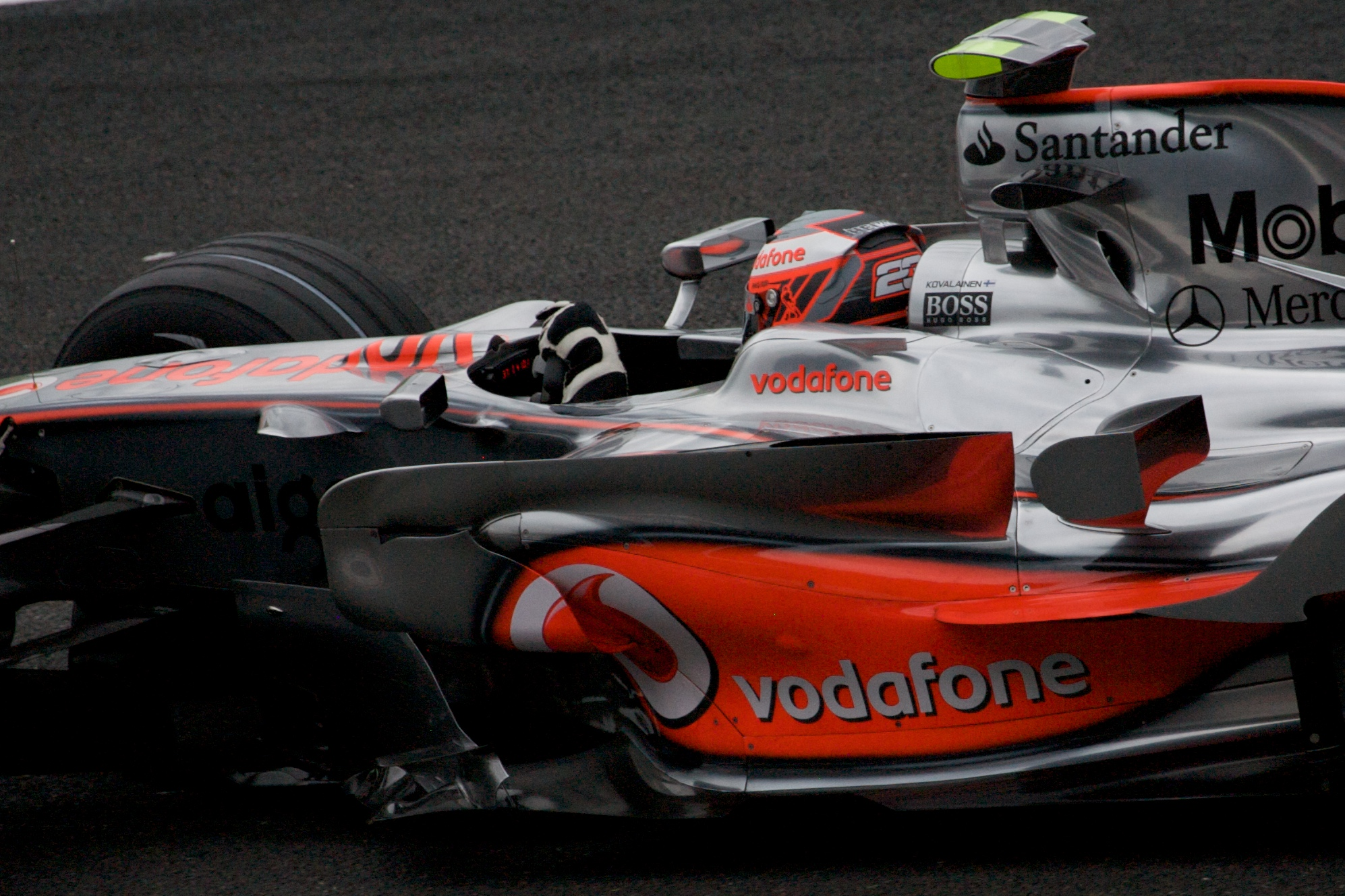
Kovalainen driving the McLaren MP4-23

After his first official testing session occurred on 9 January 2008 at Jerez, Kovalainen made his McLaren race début at the Australian Grand Prix, where he was quickest in the first qualifying session and started third on the grid behind Lewis Hamilton and Robert Kubica. He overtook Fernando Alonso on the final lap, but then accidentally hit the pit lane limiter granting fourth place to Alonso, himself finishing fifth, but Kovalainen did set the fastest lap of the race.

In Malaysia, Kovalainen was penalised five places for blocking Nick Heidfeld's BMW Sauber in the latter stages of qualifying, dropping to eighth. Kovalainen finished the race third as Hamilton faced problems in the pits, and Ferrari's Felipe Massa retired due to a spin. In Bahrain he flatspotted a tyre on the first lap and was consequently well off the pace of the Ferraris and the BMW Saubers. Towards the end he improved and recorded the fastest lap of the race again, coming home fifth.

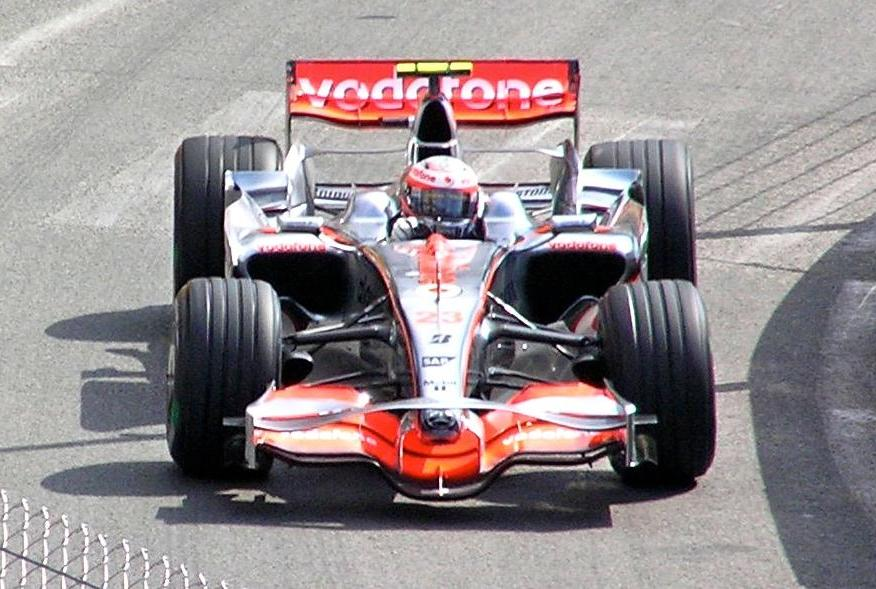
Kovalainen at the Monaco Grand Prix

At the Spanish Grand Prix, Kovalainen had just taken the lead, when his front-left tyre suddenly deflated and his car crashed into the tyre wall on lap 22. Kovalainen's car was almost completely buried under the tyres. The Safety Car was deployed for six laps as the debris was removed, and he was finally removed from the car and placed on a stretcher, at which point he gave a "thumbs-up". He was then taken by helicopter to a Barcelona area hospital for further tests. His final condition was a minor concussion, whilst also complaining of a sore elbow and neck. Kovalainen apparently did not lose consciousness at any point, according to the people who assisted him at the scene, but he himself had no memory of the accident nor of giving the "thumbs-up". The first thing he remembered was waking up at the hospital and the team doctor telling him what had happened. Kovalainen was released from the hospital two days later and he was able to race in Turkey. The cause of the accident was later determined to have been a production error on the wheel rim.

In the Turkish Grand Prix, evidence of the different driving styles used by the two McLaren drivers became apparent. Hamilton's more aggressive driving style meant that he had to adopt a three-stop strategy for the race due to concerns over his tyres' durability at Istanbul Park, while Kovalainen was able to use a two-stop strategy. Kovalainen qualified in second place, but suffered a puncture during a fight with Kimi Räikkönen in the first corner and dropped back to finish the race in 12th place.

More disappointment was to follow in Monaco, when a software glitch stalled his car on the grid. He was able to start from the pitlane after the mechanics changed his steering wheel, and he made his way up to score a point for eighth place. In Montreal, Kovalainen experienced difficulties with his tyres, as they seemed to degrade much more rapidly than Hamilton's, and the team was forced to tell him to take it easy in order to avoid a puncture. He finished ninth, and later described his race as a total catastrophe, suspecting the tyre issues had something to do with his driving style. At the French Grand Prix Kovalainen started tenth on the grid, after being docked five places for blocking Mark Webber in qualifying, and finished the race in fourth.

At Silverstone, Kovalainen achieved his first pole position, and led the race for the first four laps, before Hamilton passed him at Stowe. Despite two spins due to losing grip on the wet circuit, Kovalainen finished fifth. After the race Kovalainen reported similar tyre problems that he suffered in Canada; after a few laps the rear tyres were completely degraded and had lost their grip.

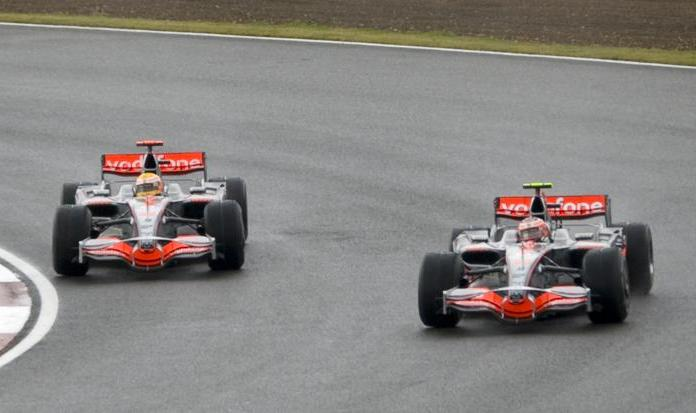
Kovalainen leading Lewis Hamilton at Silverstone

At the German Grand Prix, Kovalainen finished fifth. In the week leading up to the Hungarian Grand Prix, McLaren confirmed that Kovalainen would remain with the team for 2009. He won his only race at Hungary and became the 100th driver to win a Formula One Grand Prix after race leader Felipe Massa retired due to an engine failure with three laps remaining. After the race, Kovalainen commented: "In previous races my driving was too hard on the tyres. For this race we made somewhat radical changes to the set-up, and they were definitely a step in the right direction." He finished the following race in Valencia in fourth position, which moved him into the top five in the championship.

In September, Kovalainen elaborated on the tyre issues for Autosport. The problem seemed to be indeed caused by his different driving style compared to Hamilton, particularly the way he enters corners, uses brakes differently and then accelerates. Hamilton turns the car in a shorter time whereas Kovalainen is trying to make the corners more round, inadvertently causing more wear on the tyres. They had made progress by adapting the car and working on his driving style.

In Belgium, Kovalainen qualified third, but lost eight places at the start. On lap ten, he collided with Mark Webber and was given a drive-through penalty, which dropped him to fifteenth place. He worked his way back up to seventh, but on the final lap had to retire due to a gearbox failure, which left him outside the points. At the Italian Grand Prix, he qualified second behind Sebastian Vettel in the tricky wet conditions. In the race Kovalainen developed brake temperature problems, however, and could not match Vettel's pace, finishing in second place, but was disappointed at the lost chance for a win.

In Singapore, Kovalainen qualified fifth, and tried to overtake Kubica for fourth place at the start of the race, but they made contact at Turn 3, causing Kovalainen to lose two places to Glock and Vettel. During a Safety Car period, both McLarens pitted at the same time and Kovalainen had to queue up behind Hamilton, dropping him down the order to 14th. He ultimately finished tenth.

Prior to the Japanese Grand Prix, Kovalainen discussed his driving style and the tyre problems in an interview with the Finnish newspaper Turun Sanomat, feeling they had now solved the issues. He explained his driving style was now very close to Hamilton's, as well as his car set-up. Hamilton's aggressive driving style seemed to work the best with the McLaren MP4-23, allowing the tyres to last longer. Hamilton hits the brakes harder and turns the car more quickly into the corner, while Kovalainen's softer driving style would be to drive with a longer curve into the corner, going easier on the brakes and accelerating halfway through the corner. Since the McLaren was harder on the tyres than the Renault and the Bridgestones were not quite as robust as the Michelins, that driving style now led to excessive tyre degradation. In Japan Kovalainen qualified third behind Hamilton and Kimi Räikkönen. During the initial tussle between Hamilton and Räikkönen, Kovalainen was pushed off the track along with several other cars. Kovalainen was running in third when on lap 17 his car suffered an engine failure.

At the Chinese Grand Prix, on his 27th birthday, Kovalainen qualified in fifth position despite leading the timesheets in the initial part of third qualifying. In the race, Kovalainen's first set of front tyres had been marked incorrectly, so the left tyre was installed on the right-hand side of the car and vice versa, meaning the tyres were spinning in the wrong direction, causing understeer. He reported the understeer on the radio, and during his first pit stop the mechanics tried to improve the situation by raising the front-wing angle. Now that he also had correctly marked tyres, however, meant that the front-wing was now causing oversteer and making the front of the car heavier. This possibly caused the puncture to his front right tyre on lap 35, forcing him to pit and drop down to 17th, before he finally retired on lap 49 due to a hydraulics problem.

Going into the Brazilian Grand Prix, Kovalainen qualified fifth on the grid, leading many to believe that the McLarens were fuelled heavier than the other frontrunners, having set the pace earlier in the weekend. Kovalainen eventually finished seventh.

==== 2009 ====
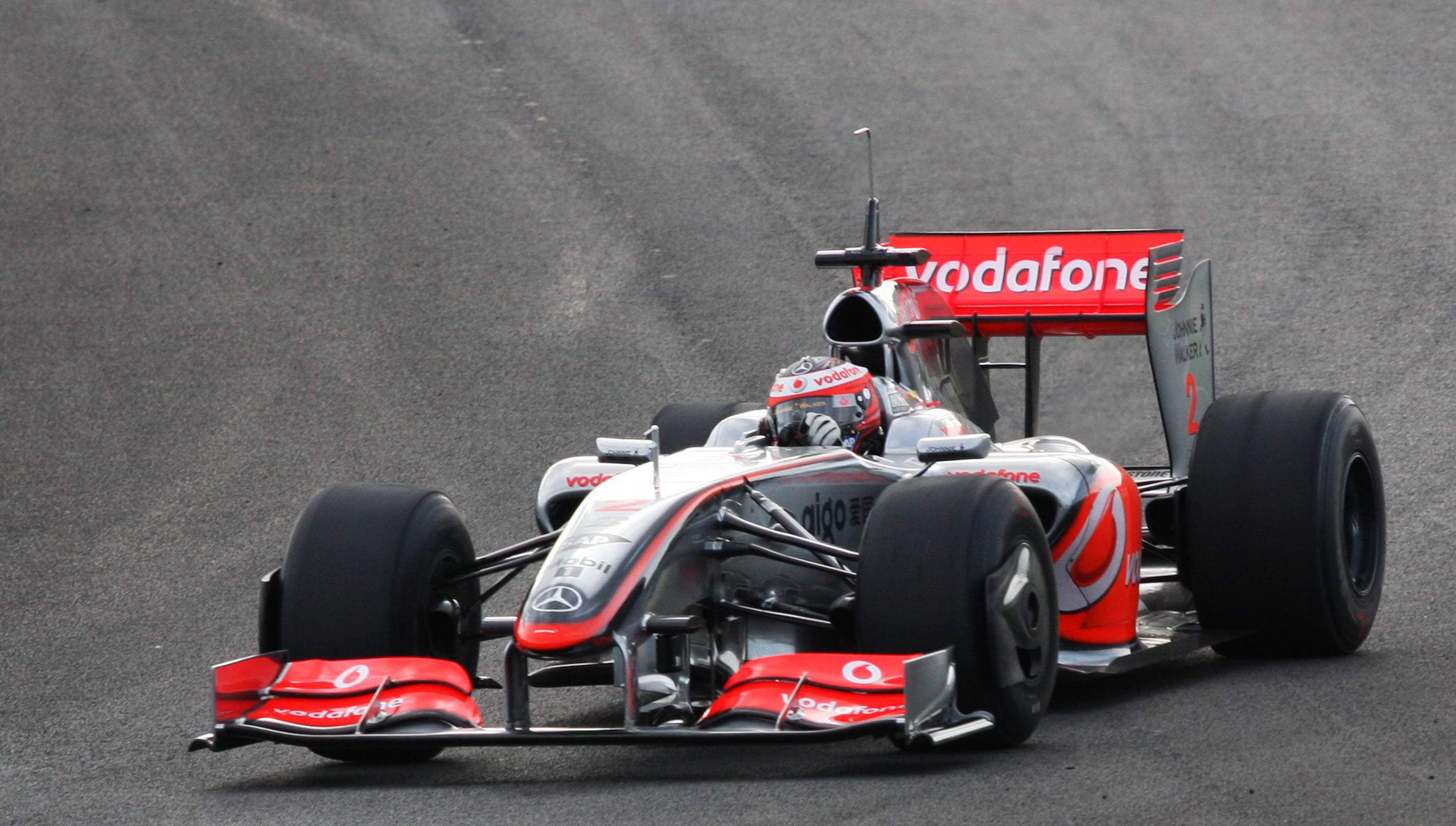
Kovalainen testing the McLaren MP4-24 at Jerez

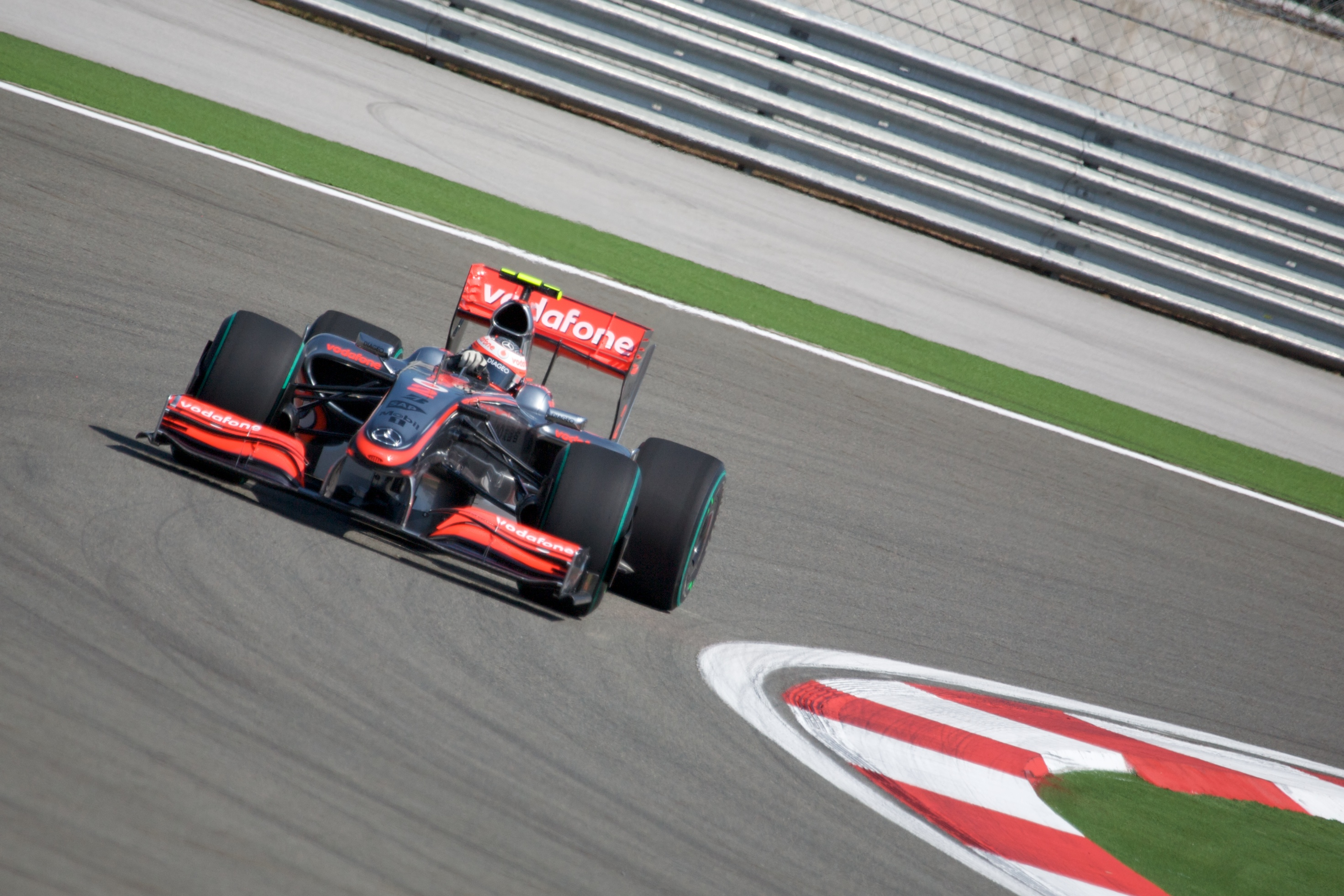
Kovalainen at the 2009 Turkish Grand Prix

At the start of the 2009 season, McLaren were struggling for pace. Both Kovalainen and Hamilton failed to get into the top ten in qualifying for the first two races.

In the Australian Grand Prix, Kovalainen retired due to a collision with Mark Webber in the first corner and in Malaysia he spun off on the first lap while fighting for position with Hamilton and Massa. In China, he scored his first points of the season by finishing fifth. McLaren gradually developed the car and results began to improve, with Kovalainen finishing eighth in Germany, fifth in Hungary and his best result of the season, a fourth place at the European Grand Prix. This was followed by back-to-back sixth places at Spa and Monza, and seventh in Singapore. He ended the season with 22 points having had five retirements, this left him in 12th position in the championship. On 18 November, it was announced that recently crowned world champion Jenson Button had been signed on a multi-year deal as Hamilton's teammate, leaving Kovalainen without a 2010 F1 drive.

=== Lotus (2010–2011) ===
==== 2010 ====
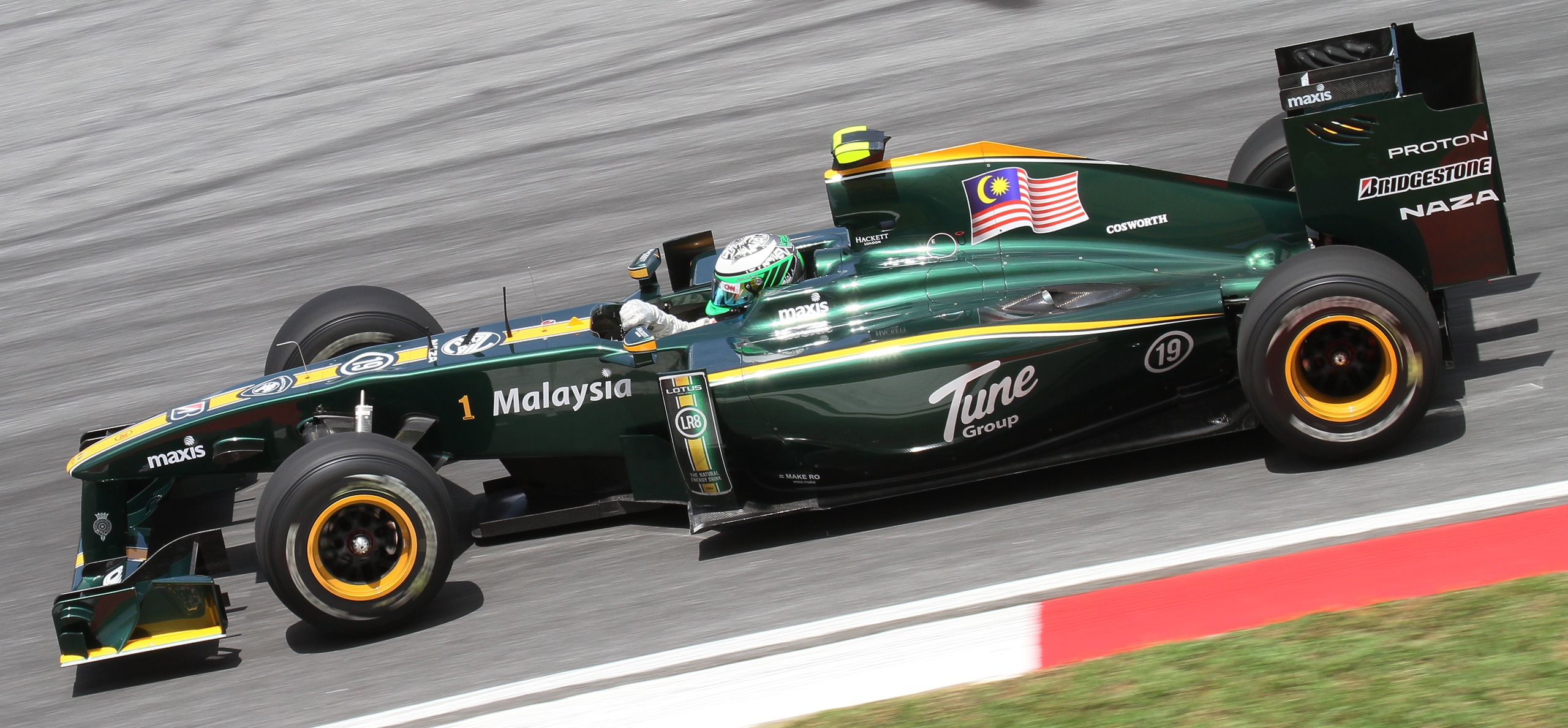
Kovalainen driving for Lotus at the 2010 Malaysian Grand Prix

It was announced on 14 December 2009, that Kovalainen would drive for Lotus Racing in 2010 along with Jarno Trulli. The team made their debut at the Bahrain Grand Prix on 14 March 2010. The car was off the pace in pre-season testing, due to a lack of downforce caused by the need for a conservative initial design. Kovalainen finished in fifteenth position in the race, two laps down on winner Fernando Alonso.

In Australia, Trulli did not start the race and Kovalainen finished 13th. In Malaysia, Kovalainen retired with ten laps to go, and followed this up with 14th in China, while in Spain Kovalainen failed to start with gearbox problems. He retired in Monaco with steering problems, and in Turkey with hydraulic problems. Kovalainen finished 16th in Canada, two laps down.

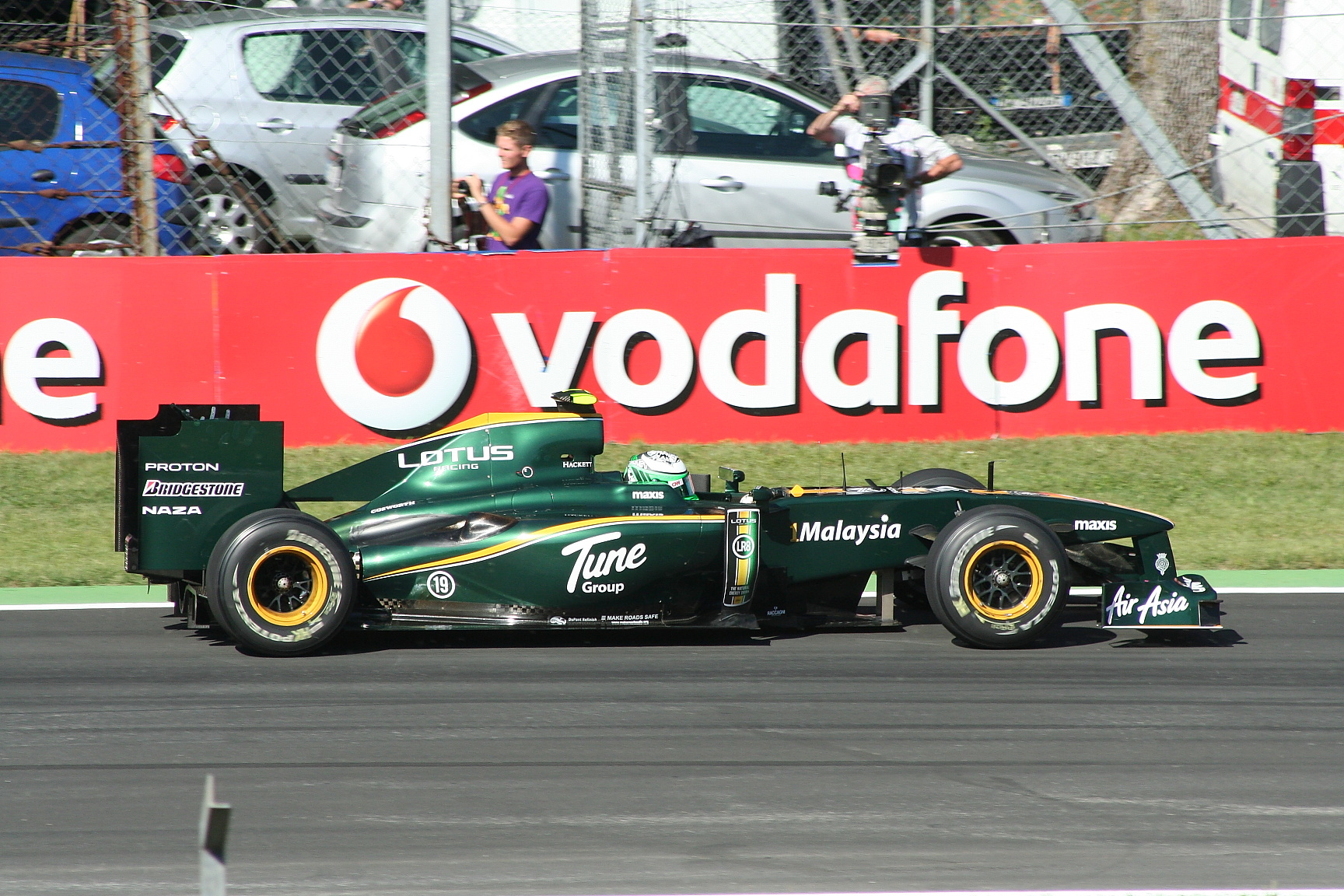
Kovalainen driving for Lotus at the 2010 Italian Grand Prix

At Valencia on lap 9, Mark Webber's Red Bull hit Kovalainen's Lotus and went over the top, before landing and skidding into the barrier. Kovalainen recovered to the pits but retired from the race. A 17th-place finish at Silverstone and a fourteenth in Hungary sandwiched his fourth retirement of the season in Germany, due to damage caused by a collision with Sauber's Pedro de la Rosa. He retired yet again at the 2010 Singapore Grand Prix after his car caught fire in the final lap, although his decision to not go into the pit lane and instead stop at the side of the track and tackle the blaze himself was met with applause from the crowd.

==== 2011 ====
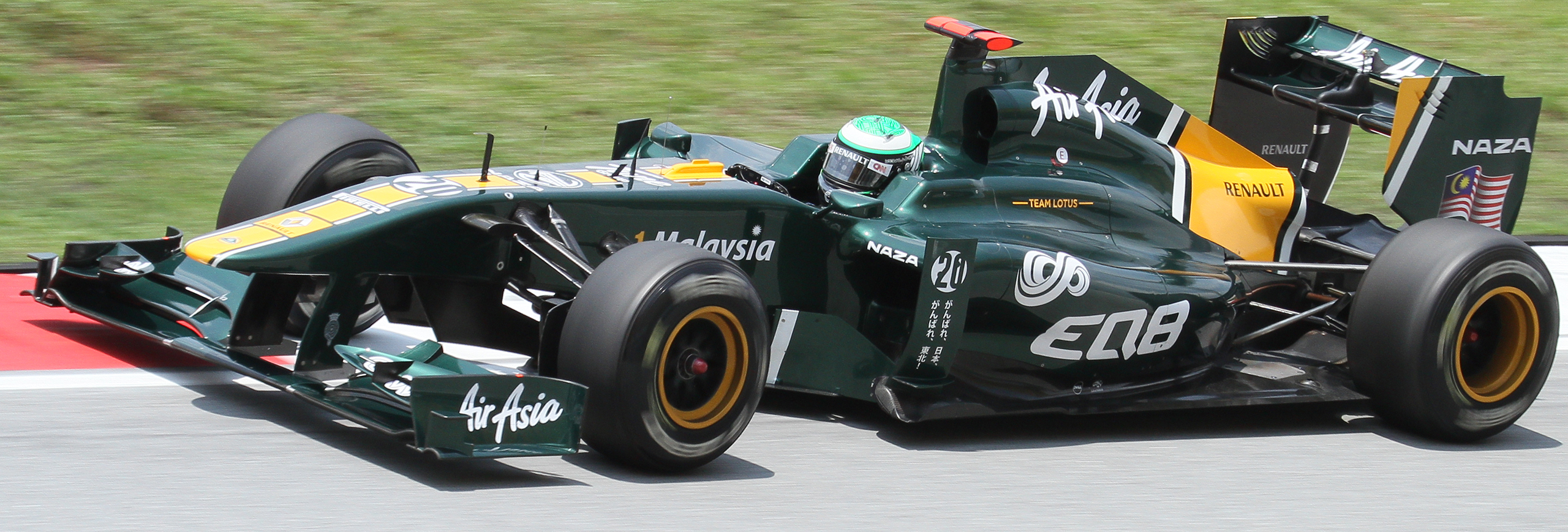
Kovalainen driving for Lotus at the 2011 Malaysian Grand Prix

Kovalainen remained with Lotus in 2011. At the season-opening Australian Grand Prix, he was forced to retire after a water leak, before recording his first finish of the season in Malaysia where he finished 15th, before a 16th-place finish in China. He finished 19th in Turkey and crashed out in Spain, having started from 15th on the grid, outqualifying the Force Indias of Paul di Resta and Adrian Sutil. He finished 14th in Monaco and 19th at the European Grand Prix, with further retirements in Canada and Great Britain. Kovalainen finished 16th at the German Grand Prix, before another retirement due to a water leak in Hungary. Kovalainen then finished each of the next five races, with a best placing of 13th at the Italian Grand Prix. He also finished on the lead lap, in 18th place at the Japanese Grand Prix, and finished ahead of the Saubers of Kamui Kobayashi and Sergio Pérez in Korea, in 14th place. In India, Kovalainen finished 14th again, running as high as tenth place during the race.

During the season, Kovalainen outqualified teammates Trulli and Karun Chandhok in 17 out of the 19 races held, and Team Lotus principal Tony Fernandes stated that he was satisfied with Kovalainen's performance over the season.

=== Caterham (2012–2013) ===
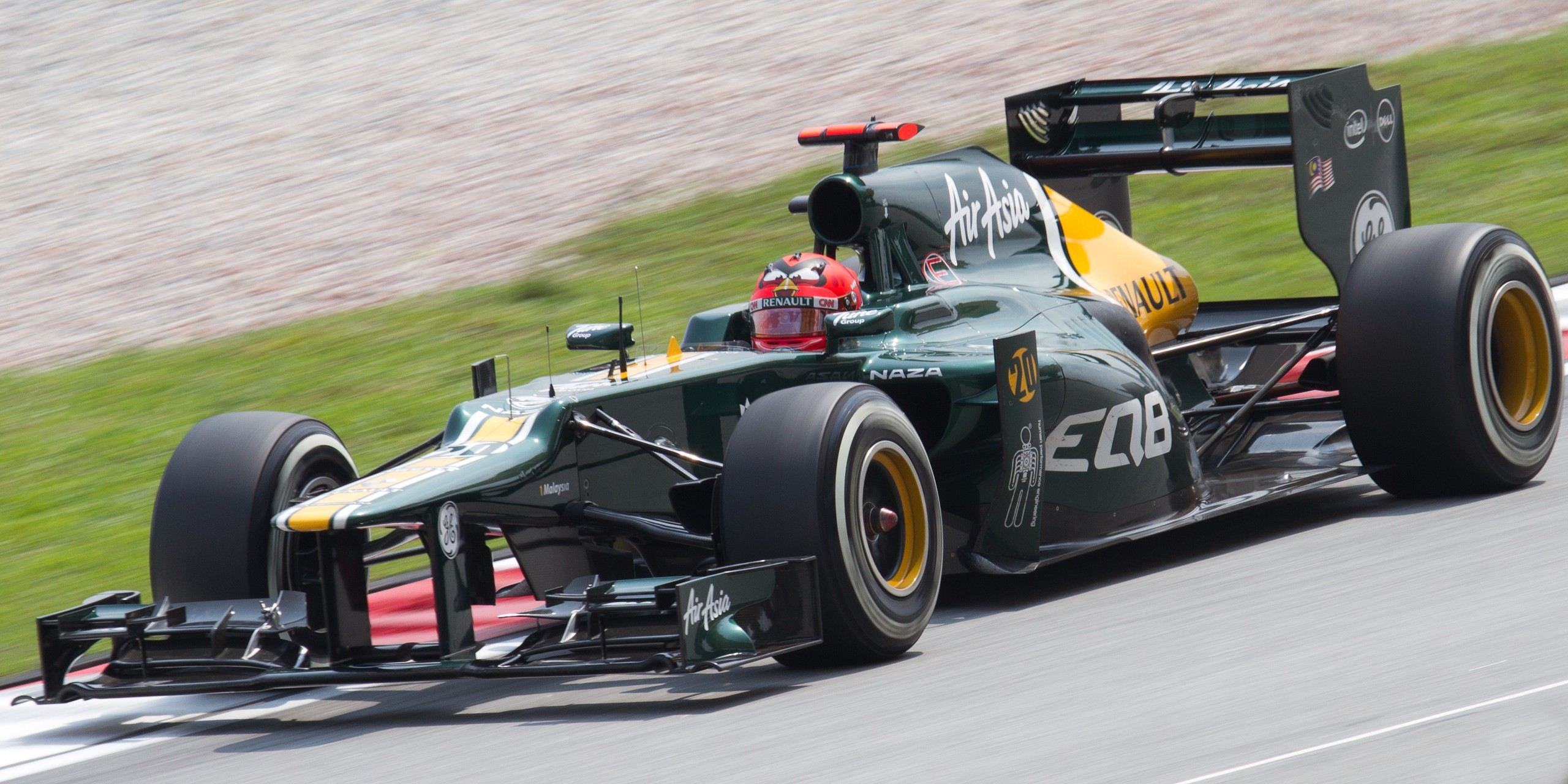
Kovalainen, complete with his new Angry Birds-themed helmet design, driving for Caterham at the 2012 Malaysian Grand Prix.

==== 2012 ====
Kovalainen was retained by the team – renamed Caterham F1 for 2012 – for a third year, partnering Vitaly Petrov. This season was more stable, as Kovalainen finished all races but the initial Australian Grand Prix.

==== 2013 ====
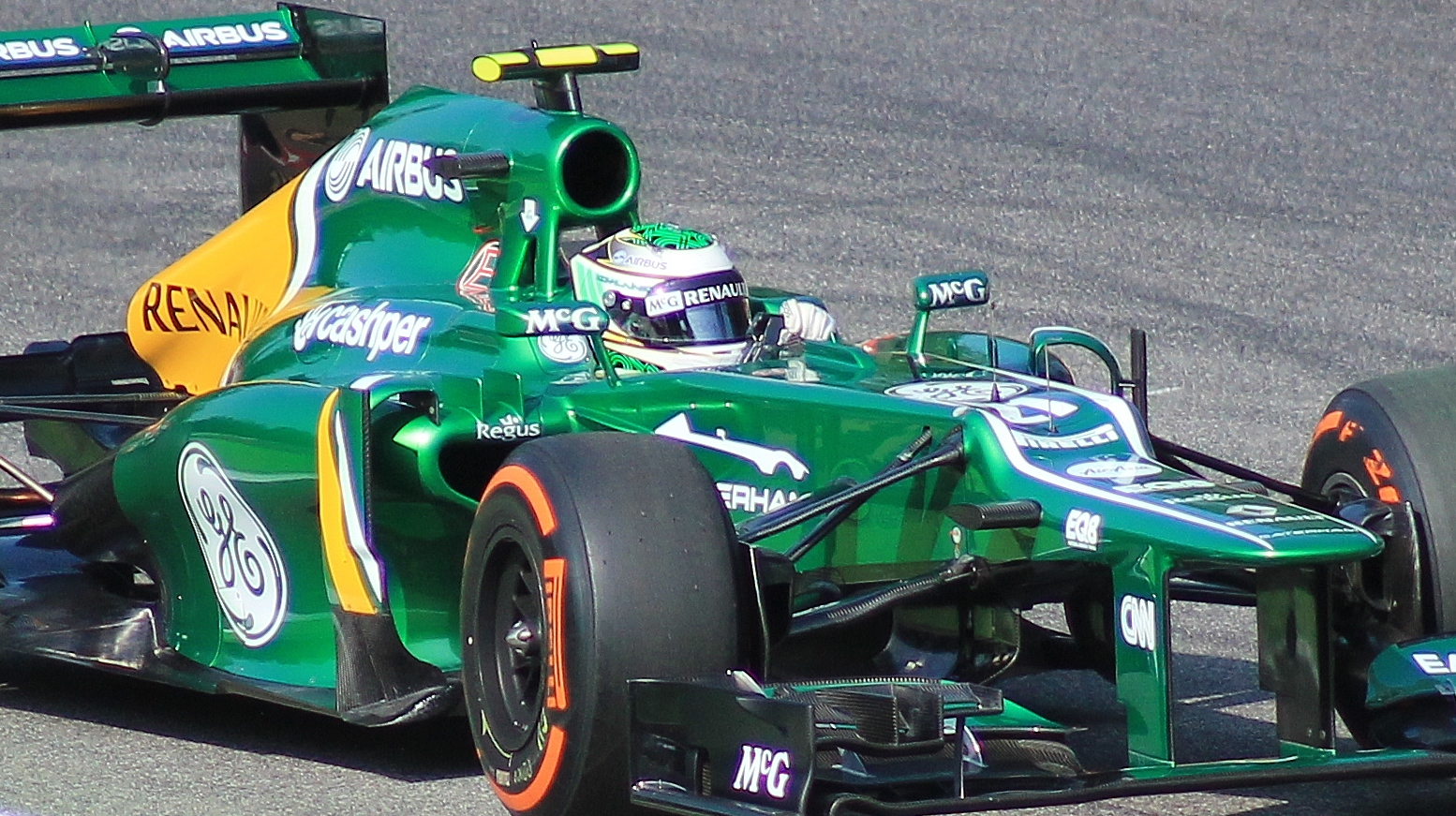
Kovalainen testing at the 2013 Italian Grand Prix

Kovalainen and Petrov were dropped in favour of Charles Pic and Giedo van der Garde ahead of the 2013 season, but Kovalainen remained on good terms with Caterham, attending the Malaysian Grand Prix as a personal guest of Tony Fernandes. Ahead of the Bahrain Grand Prix, the team announced that it had re-signed Kovalainen as one of its reserve drivers, replacing Ma Qing Hua and alongside Alexander Rossi, in which role he took part in the first free practice sessions in Bahrain and Spain.

=== Lotus (2013) ===
==== 2013 ====
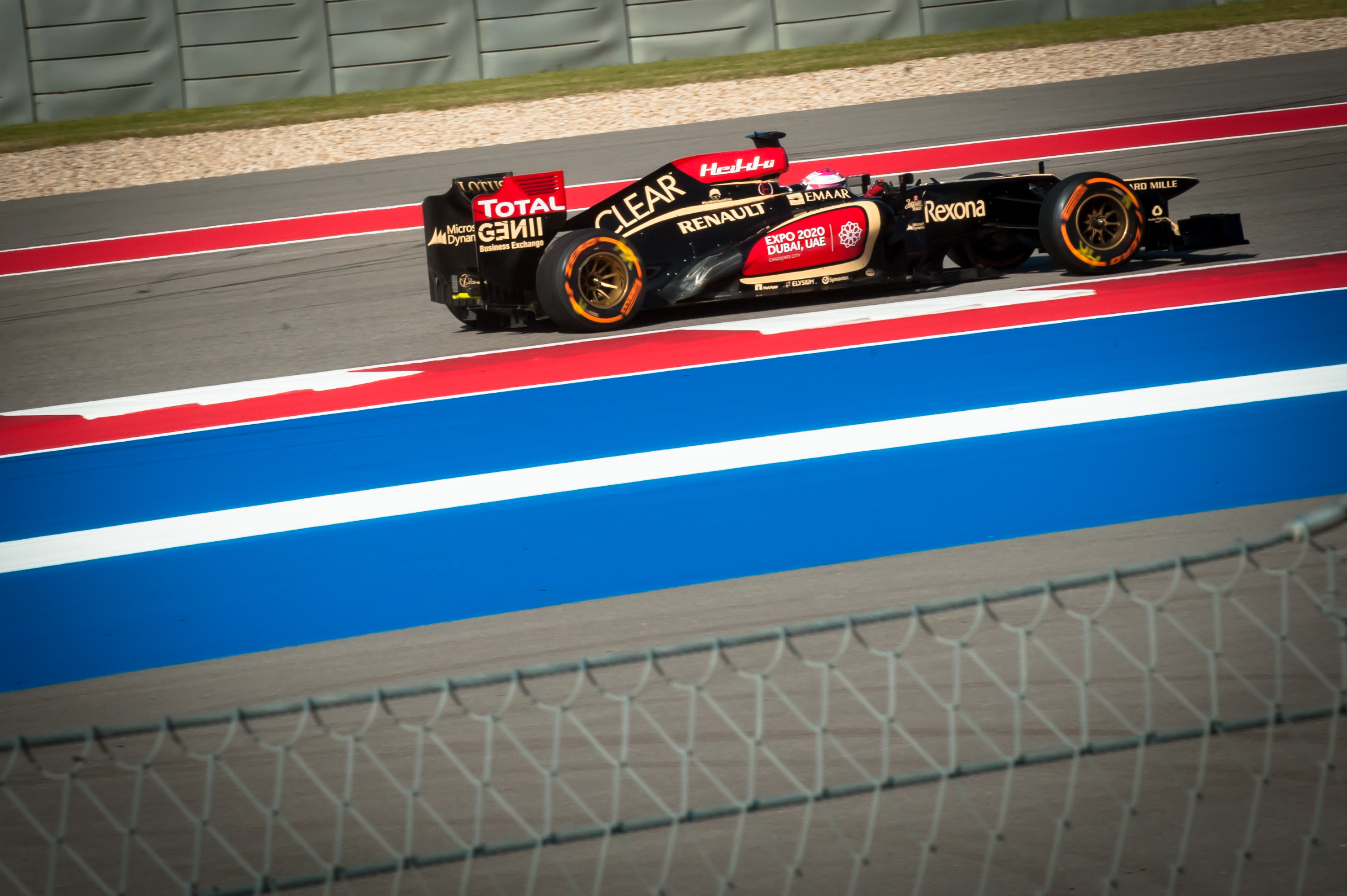
Kovalainen at the United States Grand Prix, subbing in for compatriot Räikkönen

On 14 November 2013, it was confirmed by the Lotus F1 Team that Kovalainen would stand in for regular driver Kimi Räikkönen as Räikkönen was having back surgery. Kovalainen raced at the United States Grand Prix and the Brazilian Grand Prix. He finished 14th in both races.

=== After Lotus ===
Kovalainen was linked with joining Mercedes as a test driver for 2014 and reuniting with his former McLaren teammate Lewis Hamilton however it was never confirmed. In August, he completed a test for the BMW Motorsport DTM team with a BMW M4 DTM.

In August 2020, F1, in partnership with Amazon Web Services and machine learning, ranked Kovalainen as the eighth fastest Formula One driver in qualifying from 1983 to 2020. This was from a partnership with AWS (Amazon Web Services), who used an algorithm of the performance of every driver compared to their teammates to determine the fastest drivers in F1 qualifying sessions.

== Race of Champions ==
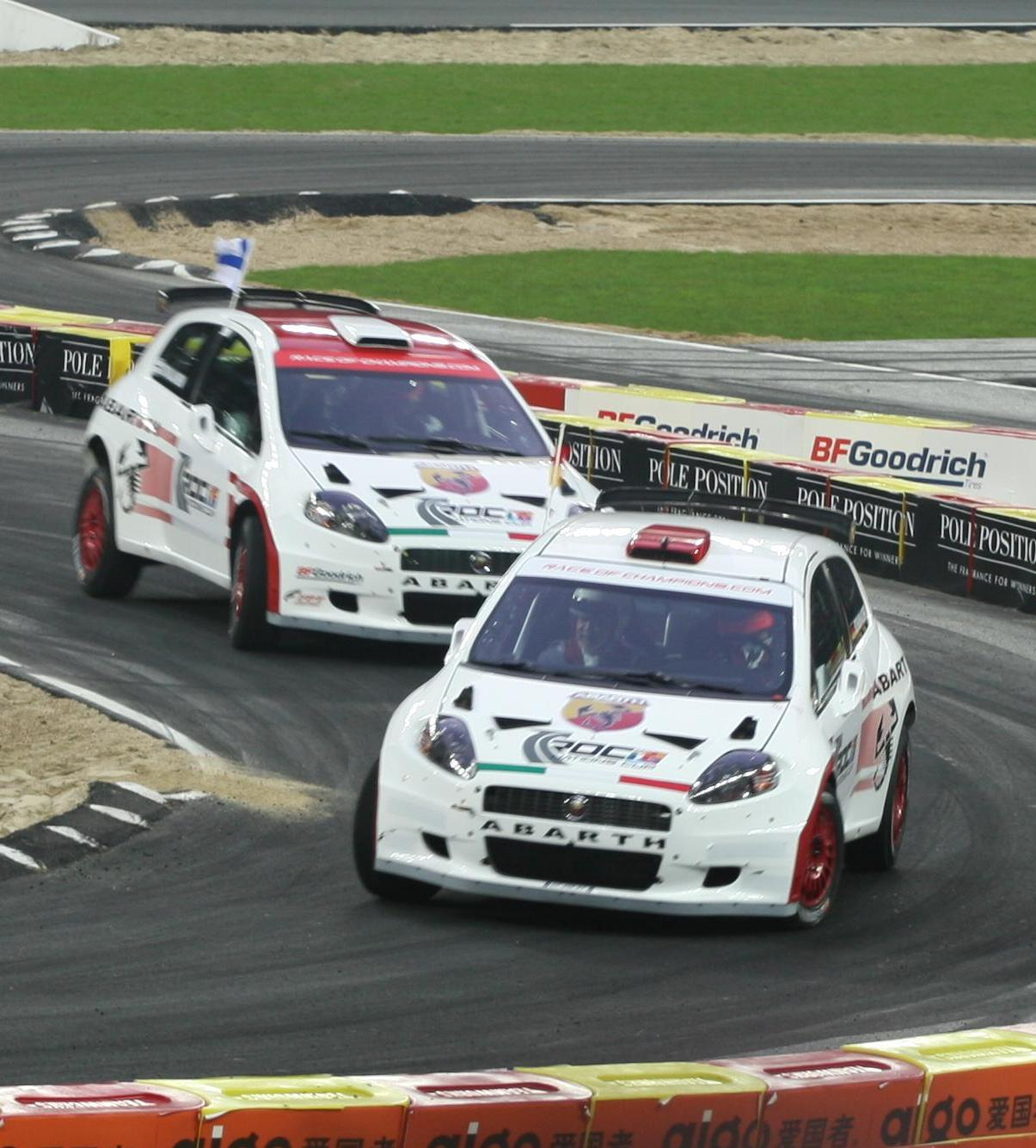
Kovalainen and Michael Schumacher at the 2007 Race of Champions

Kovalainen competed in the 2004 Race of Champions at the Stade de France in Paris. In the first two rounds he defeated Formula One drivers David Coulthard and Jean Alesi, and then Ferrari Formula One star Michael Schumacher in a Ferrari 360 Modena in the semi-finals. He then beat World Rally Champion Sébastien Loeb in the finals using the Ferrari and a Peugeot 307 WRC car, although Kovalainen had never even sat in a rally car before, to become the first non-rally driver to win the Henri Toivonen Memorial Trophy and earn the title "Champion of Champions". He also participated in the Nations Cup alongside countryman Marcus Grönholm, but they finished in second place after Kovalainen's Ferrari 360 Modena broke down in the finals, losing to the French team of Loeb and Alesi.

Kovalainen returned to the Race of Champions in 2005, defeating Bernd Schneider and Felipe Massa, but was then knocked out in the semi-finals by Tom Kristensen. He won the Nations Cup with Grönholm in 2006, but was eliminated in the individual event at the semi-final stage by Mattias Ekström by a mere 0.0002 seconds. In 2007, Kovalainen and Grönholm again made the Nations Cup final, where they lost to the German team of Michael Schumacher and Sebastian Vettel. Kovalainen beat Vettel in the individual race, before crashing on the finish line in the next round against Andy Priaulx. He crossed the line out of control, and Priaulx pipped him.

Kovalainen returned to the event in 2010, where he withdrew after suffering a concussion in a crash after a heat race against Sébastien Loeb.

== Super GT ==
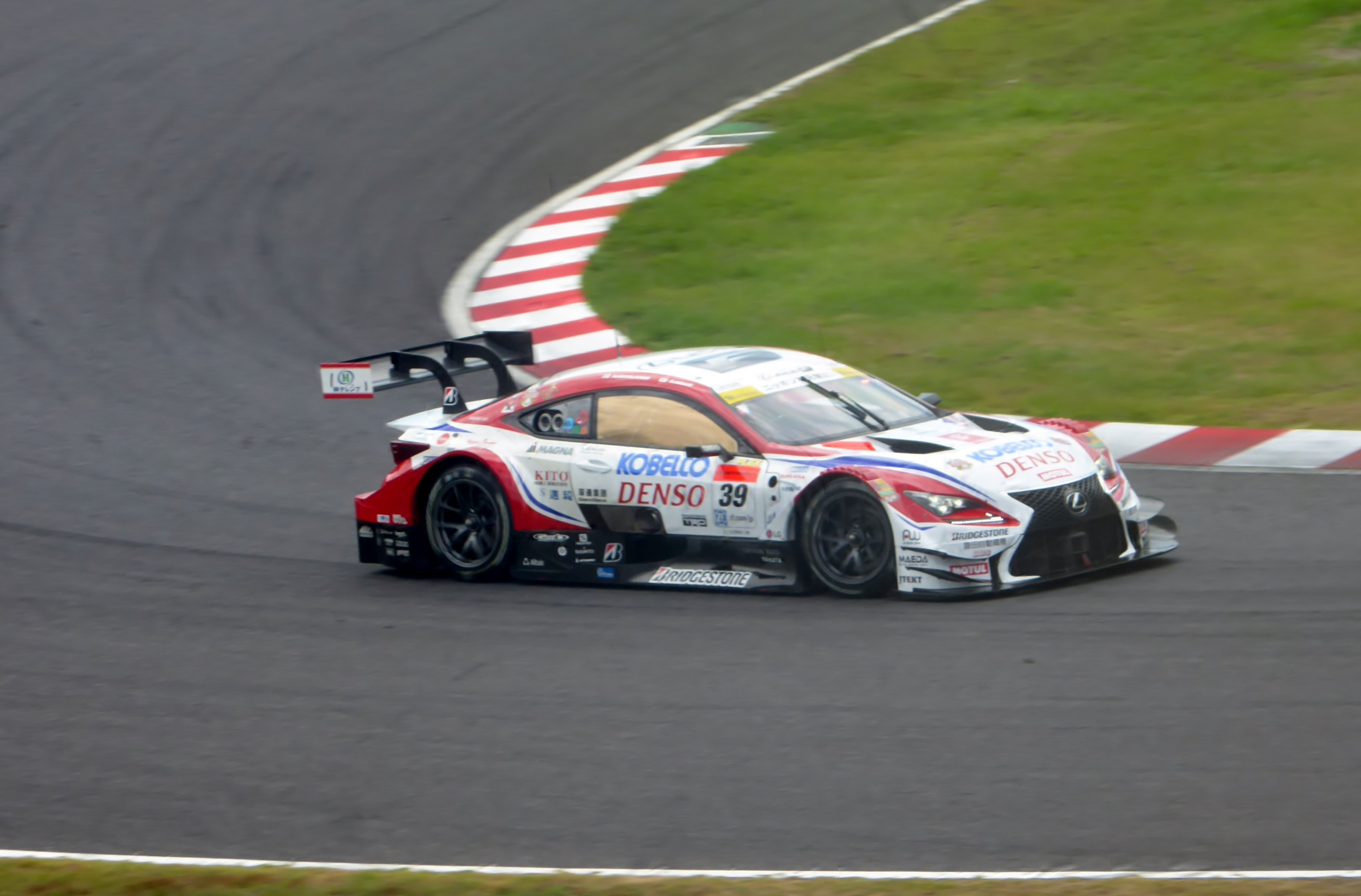
Kovalainen took the 2016 GT500 Drivers' Championship title.

In 2015, Kovalainen moved to Japan to compete in Super GT (GT500 class) with Lexus. In his first season of Super GT, he drove the Lexus RC F GT500 for SARD with Kohei Hirate. The following year, Kovalainen and Hirate won the Super GT championship: after going into the season's closing double header at Twin Ring Motegi in fourth place in the standings, they qualified on pole and led most of the first of the two races before dropping down to second, subsequently taking their only win of the season in the final round to clinch the title. The championship win was Kovalainen's first since winning the Nissan World Series in 2004. After the end of the 2021 season, Kovalainen announced that he would retire from the series.

== Rallying ==
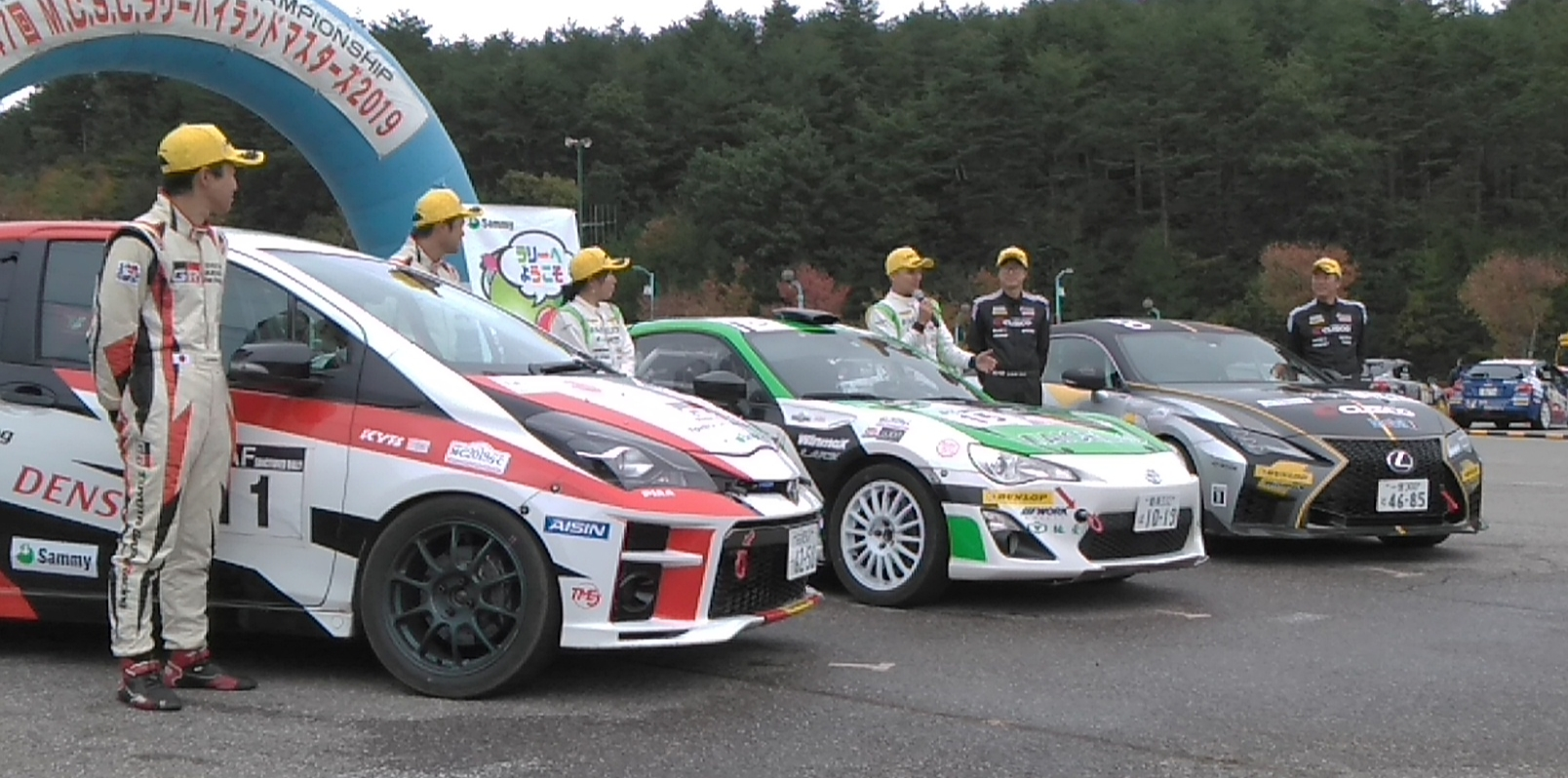
2019 All Japanese Rally Championship, Heikki Kovalainen's first win and his Interview.

Like many of his compatriots, Kovalainen developed an interest in rallying, with him stating it was a "childhood dream". An initial attempt at rallying was made in 2009 to contest the Arctic Rally after being released from his "restrictive" contract with McLaren in Formula One, with Kovalainen reportedly set to drive a Proton Satria Neo S2000 rally car in the 2010 Arctic Rally; this plan ultimately never came to be as Kovalainen "did not have time to seriously prepare for the rally". He would make his actual rallying debut at the same rally five years later in 2015, finishing third in his class.

Kovalainen's first foray into rallying in Japan came in 2016, entering four events of the Japan Rally Championship with co-driver Sae Kitagawa in a Toyota GT86 CS-R3 campaigned by SARD. Kovalainen retired in Hokkaido but finished second in his class at the Shinshiro Rally. Kovalainen would return to the series in 2018 with the same car and co-driver but now competing for Rally Team AICELLO on a part-time schedule, as well as the Japan Super Rally Series in 2019, also with the same car and co-driver. Kovalainen was supposed to compete in the Japan Rally Championship full-time in 2020, but the onset of the COVID-19 pandemic halted these plans; he only competed in the Chūbu-Kinki Rally that year, winning the rally. He would finally compete full-time in the series in 2021 with Kitagawa in the JN2 class; Kovalainen dominated the championship, achieving a class victory in all six races and clinching the championship with a round to spare.

Following his Super GT exit, Kovalainen concentrated on rallying full-time in the Japan Rally Championship with Rally Team AICELLO, now driving a Škoda Fabia R5 in the JN1 class. He also announced plans to potentially compete in Rally Japan, the final round of the World Rally Championship, in a WRC2 car.

== 24 Hours of Le Mans ==
Kovalainen was slated to compete in the 2021 24 Hours of Le Mans in the No. 72 Porsche 911 RSR-19 for HubAuto Racing, alongside fellow Super GT competitor Nick Cassidy and GT racer Dries Vanthoor; a clashing commitment caused by the rescheduling of the Suzuka Round of the 2021 Super GT Series meant that Kovalainen and Cassidy were ultimately unable to attend. They were replaced by Álvaro Parente and Maxime Martin. Despite this, Kovalainen stated that he would still be open to racing at Le Mans should an opportunity arise, although the Japan Rally Championship was still his priority.

== Extreme E ==
Kovalainen made his Extreme E debut in the 2023 season for JBXE; he was partnered with Hedda Hosås. He was replaced with Andreas Bakkerud after two rounds of the championship.

== Personal life ==
In 2014, Kovalainen married his English girlfriend Catherine Hyde, with whom he has been in a relationship since 2002. They live in Coppet, Switzerland. In June 2023 they welcomed their first child, a son.

Kovalainen plays the drums and golf in his free time.

Following a routine health check in November 2023, Kovalainen was diagnosed with an ascending aortic aneurysm. He underwent successful surgery to correct the dilation he had experienced, and recovered to return to racing in a few months.

== Racing record ==
=== Career summary ===
Season	Series	Team	Races	Wins	Poles	F/Laps	Podiums	Points	Position
2001	Formula Renault UK	Fortec Motorsport	13	2	2	3	5	243	4th
2001	Macau Grand Prix	Fortec Motorsport	1	0	0	0	0	N/A	8th
2001	Korea Super Prix	Fortec Motorsport	1	0	0	0	0	N/A	25th
2002	British Formula 3 Championship	Fortec Motorsport	26	5	2	3	12	257	**3rd**
2002	Macau Grand Prix	Fortec Motorsport	1	0	0	0	1	N/A	**2nd**
2002	Korea Super Prix	Fortec Motorsport	1	0	0	0	0	N/A	14th
2002	Masters of Formula 3	Fortec Motorsport	1	0	0	0	0	N/A	4th
2003	World Series by Nissan	Gabord Competición	18	1	3	1	4	134	**2nd**
2004	World Series by Nissan	Pons Racing	18	6	10	8	11	176	**1st**
2004	Formula One	Mild Seven Renault F1 Team	Test driver						
2005	GP2 Series	Arden International	23	5	2	1	12	105	**2nd**
2005	Formula One	Mild Seven Renault F1 Team	Test driver						
2006	Formula One	Mild Seven Renault F1 Team	Test driver						
2006	Formula One	Team McLaren Mercedes	Test driver						
2007	Formula One	ING Renault F1 Team	17	0	0	0	1	30	7th
2008	Formula One	Vodafone McLaren Mercedes	18	1	1	2	3	53	7th
2009	Formula One	Vodafone McLaren Mercedes	17	0	0	0	0	22	12th
2010	Formula One	Lotus Racing	19	0	0	0	0	0	20th
2011	Formula One	Team Lotus	19	0	0	0	0	0	22nd
2012	Formula One	Caterham F1 Team	20	0	0	0	0	0	22nd
2013	Formula One	Caterham F1 Team	Test driver						
2013	Formula One	Lotus F1 Team	2	0	0	0	0	0	21st
2014	Deutsche Tourenwagen Masters	BMW Motorsport	Test driver						
2015	Super GT - GT500	Lexus Team SARD	8	0	0	0	0	23	13th
2016	Super GT - GT500	Lexus Team SARD	8	1	2	0	4	82	**1st**
2016	All-Japan Rally Championship - JN-5	Luck Sport	4	0	—N/a	—N/a	2	N/A	NC†
2017	Super GT - GT500	Lexus Team SARD	8	1	0	0	2	44	8th
2018	Super GT - GT500	Lexus Team SARD	8	1	0	0	2	42	9th
2018	All-Japan Rally Championship - JN-4	Rally Team AICELLO	1	0	—N/a	—N/a	0	0	NC
2019	Super GT - GT500	Lexus Team SARD	8	1	0	0	1	44	5th
2019	All-Japan Rally Championship - JN-2	Rally Team AICELLO	3	1	—N/a	—N/a	3	71	5th
2019	Intercontinental GT Challenge	HubAuto Corsa	1	0	0	0	0	0	NC
2020	Super GT - GT500	Toyota Gazoo Racing Team SARD	6	1	0	0	1	31	11th
2021	Super GT - GT500	Toyota Gazoo Racing Team SARD	8	0	0	0	0	34	13th
2021	All-Japan Rally Championship - JN-2	Rally Team AICELLO	6	6	—N/a	—N/a	6	155	**1st**
2022	All-Japan Rally Championship - JN-1	Rally Team AICELLO	8	6	—N/a	—N/a	6	150	**1st**
2022	World Rally Championship	Heikki Kovalainen	1	0	—N/a	—N/a	0	1	37th
2022	WRC2	Heikki Kovalainen	1	0	—N/a	—N/a	0	12	33rd
2023	All-Japan Rally Championship - JN-1	Rally Team AICELLO	7	5	—N/a	—N/a	6	137	**1st**
2023	Finnish Rally Championship - SM1	Secto Automotive Labs	6	0	—N/a	—N/a	0	46	6th
2023	Extreme E Championship	JBXE	2	0	—N/a	—N/a	0	5	19th
2023	World Rally Championship	Heikki Kovalainen	1	0	—N/a	—N/a	0	0	NC
2023	WRC2	Heikki Kovalainen	1	0	—N/a	—N/a	0	0	NC
2024	All-Japan Rally Championship - JN-1	Rally Team AICELLO	3	1	—N/a	—N/a	1	24	9th
2024	World Rally Championship	Heikki Kovalainen	1	0	—N/a	—N/a	0	0	NC
2024	WRC2	Heikki Kovalainen	1	0	—N/a	—N/a	0	0	NC
2025	All-Japan Rally Championship - JN-1	Rally Team AICELLO	8	2	—N/a	—N/a	6	123	**1st**
2025	WRC2	Heikki Kovalainen	1	0	—N/a	—N/a	0	12	28th

=== Complete Formula Renault 2.0 UK Championship results ===
(key) (Races in bold indicate pole position) (Races in italics indicate fastest lap)

Year	Entrant	1	2	3	4	5	6	7	8	9	10	11	12	13	DC	Pts
2001	Fortec Motorsports	BHI; 15	THR; 14	OUL; Ret	SIL; 7	DON; 18	KNO; 5	SNE; 5	CRO; 5	OUL; 2	**SIL**; 1	**SIL**; 1	DON; 2	BGP; 3	4th	243

=== Complete British Formula Three Championship results ===
(key) (Races in bold indicate pole position) (Races in italics indicate fastest lap)

Year	Entrant	Chassis	Engine	1	2	3	4	5	6	7	8	9	10	11	12	13	14	15	16	17	18	19	20	21	22	23	24	25	26	27	DC	Pts	Ref
2002	Fortec Motorsport	Dallara F302	Renault Sodemo	BRH; 1; 8	BRH; 2; 10	DON; 1; 7	DON; 2; 6	SIL; 1 Ret	SIL; 2; 2	KNO; 1; 3	KNO; 2; 13	CRO; 1; 4	CRO; 2 C	SIL; 1; 21	SIL; 2; 8	CAS; 1; 4	CAS; 2; 17	BRH; 1; 14	BRH; 2; 5	**ROC**; **1**; 2	ROC; 2; 2	**OUL**; **1**; 1	OUL; 2; 3	SNE; 1; 4	SNE; 2; 3	SNE; 3; 1	THR; 1; 1	THR; 2; 1	DON; 1; 1	DON; 2; 2	3rd	257	

=== Complete World Series by Nissan results ===
(key) (Races in bold indicate pole position) (Races in italics indicate fastest lap)

Year	Entrant	1	2	3	4	5	6	7	8	9	10	11	12	13	14	15	16	17	18	DC	Points
2003	Gabord Competición	JAR1; 1; 4	JAR1; 2; 3	ZOL; 1 Ret	ZOL; 2; 7	MAG; 1; 5	MAG; 2; 6	MNZ; 1 Ret	MNZ; 2 Ret	**LAU**; **1**; 2	**LAU**; **2**; 1	A1R; 1; 8	A1R; 2; 6	CAT; 1; 6	CAT; 2; 8	VAL; 1; 6	VAL; 2; 4	JAR2; 1; 2	**JAR2**; **2**; 5	2nd	131
2004	Pons Racing	JAR; 1; 7	JAR; 2; 4	ZOL; 1; 4	**ZOL**; **2**; 2	**MAG**; **1**; 2	**MAG**; **2**; 1	**VAL1**; **1**; 2	**VAL1**; **2**; 1	**LAU**; **1**; 1	**LAU**; **2**; 1	EST; 1; 13	EST; 2; 3	CAT; 1; 2	**CAT**; **2**; 1	VAL2; 1; 10	VAL2; 1; 5	**JER**; **1**; 1	**JER**; **1**; 14	1st	186

=== Complete GP2 Series results ===
(key) (Races in bold indicate pole position) (Races in italics indicate fastest lap)

Year	Entrant	1	2	3	4	5	6	7	8	9	10	11	12	13	14	15	16	17	18	19	20	21	22	23	DC	Points
2005	Arden International	IMO; FEA; 1	IMO; SPR; 3	CAT; FEA; 3	CAT; SPR; Ret	**MON**; **FEA**; 5	NÜR; FEA; 1	NÜR; SPR; Ret	MAG; FEA; 1	MAG; SPR; 3	SIL; FEA; 2	SIL; SPR; 3	HOC; FEA; 5	HOC; SPR; 6	HUN; FEA; 2	HUN; SPR; 5	IST; FEA; 10	IST; SPR; 1	**MNZ**; **FEA**; 1	MNZ; SPR; 5	SPA; FEA; 15†	SPA; SPR; 9	BHR; FEA; 3	BHR; SPR; Ret	2nd	105

=== Complete Formula One results ===
(key) (Races in bold indicate pole position) (Races in italics indicate fastest lap)

Year	Entrant	Chassis	Engine	1	2	3	4	5	6	7	8	9	10	11	12	13	14	15	16	17	18	19	20	WDC	Points
2007	ING Renault F1 Team	Renault R27	Renault RS27 2.4 V8	AUS; 10	MAL; 8	BHR; 9	ESP; 7	MON; 13^{†}	CAN; 4	USA; 5	FRA; 15	GBR; 7	EUR; 8	HUN; 8	TUR; 6	ITA; 7	BEL; 8	JPN; 2	CHN; 9	BRA; Ret				7th	30
2008	Vodafone McLaren Mercedes	McLaren MP4-23	Mercedes FO 108V 2.4 V8	AUS; 5	MAL; 3	BHR; 5	ESP; Ret	TUR; 12	MON; 8	CAN; 9	FRA; 4	**GBR**; 5	GER; 5	HUN; 1	EUR; 4	BEL; 10^{†}	ITA; 2	SIN; 10	JPN; Ret	CHN; Ret	BRA; 7			7th	53
2009	Vodafone McLaren Mercedes	McLaren MP4-24	Mercedes FO 108W 2.4 V8	AUS; Ret	MAL; Ret	CHN; 5	BHR; 12	ESP; Ret	MON; Ret	TUR; 14	GBR; Ret	GER; 8	HUN; 5	EUR; 4	BEL; 6	ITA; 6	SIN; 7	JPN; 11	BRA; 12	ABU; 11				12th	22
2010	Lotus Racing	Lotus T127	Cosworth CA2010 2.4 V8	BHR; 15	AUS; 13	MAL; NC	CHN; 14	ESP; DNS	MON; Ret	TUR; Ret	CAN; 16	EUR; Ret	GBR; 17	GER; Ret	HUN; 14	BEL; 16	ITA; 18	SIN; 16^{†}	JPN; 12	KOR; 13	BRA; 18	ABU; 17		20th	0
2011	Team Lotus	Lotus T128	Renault RS27-2011 2.4 V8	AUS; Ret	MAL; 15	CHN; 16	TUR; 19	ESP; Ret	MON; 14	CAN; Ret	EUR; 19	GBR; Ret	GER; 16	HUN; Ret	BEL; 15	ITA; 13	SIN; 16	JPN; 18	KOR; 14	IND; 14	ABU; 17	BRA; 16		22nd	0
2012	Caterham F1 Team	Caterham CT01	Renault RS27-2012 2.4 V8	AUS; Ret	MAL; 18	CHN; 23	BHR; 17	ESP; 16	MON; 13	CAN; 18	EUR; 14	GBR; 17	GER; 19	HUN; 17	BEL; 17	ITA; 14	SIN; 15	JPN; 15	KOR; 17	IND; 18	ABU; 13	USA; 18	BRA; 14	22nd	0
2013	Caterham F1 Team	Caterham CT03	Renault RS27-2013 2.4 V8	AUS	MAL	CHN	BHR; TD	ESP; TD	MON	CAN	GBR	GER	HUN	BEL; TD	ITA; TD	SIN	KOR	JPN; TD	IND	ABU; TD				21st	0
2013	Lotus F1 Team	Lotus E21	Renault RS27-2013 2.4 V8																		USA; 14	BRA; 14		21st	0

^{†} Did not finish, but was classified as he had completed more than 90% of the race distance.

=== Complete Super GT results ===
(key) (Races in bold indicate pole position) (Races in italics indicate fastest lap)

Year	Team	Car	Class	1	2	3	4	5	6	7	8	DC	Points
2015	Lexus Team SARD	Lexus RC F	GT500	OKA; 5	FUJ; 5	CHA; 7	FUJ; 9	SUZ; 11	SUG; Ret	AUT; 13	MOT; 6	13th	23
2016	Lexus Team SARD	Lexus RC F	GT500	OKA; 7	FUJ; 2	SUG; 2	FUJ; 8	SUZ; 8	CHA; 7	**MOT**; 2	**MOT**; 1	1st	82
2017	Lexus Team SARD	Lexus LC500	GT500	OKA; 3	FUJ; 7	AUT; 14	SUG; 1	FUJ; 10	SUZ; 13	CHA; 6	MOT; 8	8th	44
2018	Lexus Team SARD	Lexus LC 500	GT500	OKA; 12	FUJ; 2	SUZ; Ret	CHA; 1	FUJ; 11	SUG; 10	AUT; 8	MOT; 8	9th	42
2019	Lexus Team SARD	Lexus LC 500	GT500	OKA; 11	FUJ; 4	SUZ; 5	CHA; 5	FUJ; Ret	AUT; 1	SUG; 7	MOT; 11	5th	44
2020	TGR Team SARD	Toyota GR Supra GT500	GT500	FUJ	FUJ	SUZ; 5	MOT; 9	FUJ; 1	SUZ; 11	MOT; 8	FUJ; 14	11th	31
2021	TGR Team SARD	Toyota GR Supra GT500	GT500	OKA; 4	FUJ; 6	MOT; 10	SUZ; 14	SUG; 5	AUT; 5	MOT; 11	FUJ; 4	13th	34

=== World Rally Championship results ===
Year	Entrant	Car	1	2	3	4	5	6	7	8	9	10	11	12	13	14	WDC	Points
2022	Heikki Kovalainen	Škoda Fabia R5	MON	SWE	CRO	POR	ITA	KEN	EST	FIN	BEL	GRE	NZL	ESP	JPN; 10		37th	1
2023	Heikki Kovalainen	Škoda Fabia R5	MON	SWE	MEX	CRO	POR	ITA	KEN	EST	FIN	GRE	CHL	EUR	JPN; Ret		NC	0
2024	Heikki Kovalainen	Toyota GR Yaris Rally2	MON	SWE	KEN	CRO	POR	ITA	POL	LAT	FIN	GRE	CHL	EUR	JPN; Ret		NC	0
2025	Heikki Kovalainen	Toyota GR Yaris Rally2	MON	SWE	KEN	ESP	POR	ITA	GRE	EST	FIN	PAR	CHL	EUR	JPN; 11	SAU		0

=== Complete Extreme E results ===
(key)

Year	Team	Car	1	2	3	4	5	6	7	8	9	10	Pos.	Points
2023	JBXE	Spark ODYSSEY 21	DES; 1; 8	DES; 2; 10	HYD; 1	HYD; 2	ISL1; 1	ISL1; 2	ISL2; 1	ISL2; 2	COP; 1	COP; 2	19th	5

== See also ==
- Formula One drivers from Finland

Sporting positions
Preceded by Franck Montagny	World Series by Nissan champion 2004	Succeeded by Robert Kubica
Preceded by Sébastien Loeb	Race of Champions; Champion of Champions; 2004	Succeeded by Sébastien Loeb
Preceded by Tom Kristensen; Mattias Ekström	Race of Champions; Nations Cup Winner; 2006; With: Marcus Grönholm	Succeeded by Michael Schumacher; Sebastian Vettel
Preceded by Tsugio Matsuda; Ronnie Quintarelli	Super GT; GT500 Champion; 2016; With: Kohei Hirate	Succeeded by Nick Cassidy; Ryo Hirakawa
Awards and achievements
Preceded by Kimi Räikkönen	AKK Motorsport; Finnish Driver of the Year; 2004	Succeeded by Kimi Räikkönen
