= 1989 Race of Champions =

Seasons
- ← 1988 1990 →

The 1989 Race of Champions was the second event and took place on December 2–3 at the Nürburgring in memory of Henri Toivonen, who died while leading the 1986 Tour de Corse. This event featured the world’s first ever parallel rally track with drivers competing head-to-head in identical cars.

== Participants ==
Before start of the main event Spanish Rally Champion of 1987 and 1988 Carlos Sainz crashed on practice in Toyota Celica GT-4 (ST165) (number plate K-AM 6320). Sepp Haider replaced Spaniard. All participants are below.

| Driver | Titles |
|---|---|
| (Finland) Juha Kankkunen | World Rally champion in 1986, 1987 |
| (Finland) Timo Salonen | World Rally champion in 1985 |
| (Sweden) Stig Blomqvist | World Rally champion in 1984 |
| (Sweden) Kenneth Eriksson | Group A Rally champion in 1986, 2WD Rally champion in 1987 |
| (Austria) Sepp Haider | German Rally champion in 1989 |
| (Sweden) Björn Waldegård | World Rally champion in 1979 |
| (Finland) Hannu Mikkola | World Rally champion in 1983 |
| (Belgium) Marc Duez | Belgian Rally champion in 1982 and 1989 |
| (Finland) Ari Vatanen | World Rally champion in 1981 |
| (Germany) Walter Röhrl | World Rally champion in 1980, 1982 |

== Race of Champions ==
=== Qualification round ===
Cars

Opel Kadett E 2.0 GSi Group A with number plates Opel GSI 16V.

==== Race 1 ====
| Driver A | Time A | Driver B | Time B |
|---|---|---|---|
| (Finland) Juha Kankkunen | +0:01.479 | (Germany) Walter Röhrl | 1:30.177 |

==== Race 2 ====
| Driver A | Time A | Driver B | Time B |
|---|---|---|---|
| (Finland) Ari Vatanen | +0:00.469 | (Finland) Timo Salonen | 1:31.180 |

==== Race 3 ====
| Driver A | Time A | Driver B | Time B |
|---|---|---|---|
| (Belgium) Marc Duez | 1:30.156 | (Sweden) Stig Blomqvist | +0:01.270 |

==== Race 4 ====
| Driver A | Time A | Driver B | Time B |
|---|---|---|---|
| (Finland) Hannu Mikkola | +0:00.610 | (Sweden) Kenneth Eriksson | 1:30.586 |

==== Race 5 ====
| Driver A | Time A | Driver B | Time B |
|---|---|---|---|
| (Sweden) Björn Waldegård | +0:00.736 | (Austria) Sepp Haider | 1:29.938 |

==== Race 6 ====
| Driver A | Time A | Driver B | Time B |
|---|---|---|---|
| (Sweden) Stig Blomqvist | 1:29.863 | (Sweden) Björn Waldegård | +0:00.638 |

=== Quarterfinals ===
Cars

Toyota Celica GT-4 (ST165) with number plates K-AM 4135, K-AM 5265, K-AM 8582.

==== Quarterfinal 1 ====
===== Race 1 =====
| Driver A | Time A | Driver B | Time B |
|---|---|---|---|
| (Austria) Sepp Haider (K-AM 4135) | 1:26.344 | (Sweden) Kenneth Eriksson (K-AM 8582) | +0:00.441 |

===== Race 2 =====
| Driver A | Time A | Driver B | Time B |
|---|---|---|---|
| (Sweden) Kenneth Eriksson (K-AM 8582) | 1:26.762 | (Austria) Sepp Haider (K-AM 4135) | +0:00.054 |

===== Race 3 =====
| Driver A | Time A | Driver B | Time B |
|---|---|---|---|
| (Austria) Sepp Haider (K-AM 4135) | 1:25.919 | (Sweden) Kenneth Eriksson (K-AM 8582) | +0:00.086 |

Winner: Sepp Haider.

==== Quarterfinal 2 ====
===== Race 1 =====
| Driver A | Time A | Driver B | Time B |
|---|---|---|---|
| (Germany) Walter Röhrl (K-AM 4135) | +0:00.246 | (Sweden) Stig Blomqvist (K-AM 5265) | 1:26.558 |

===== Race 2 =====
| Driver A | Time A | Driver B | Time B |
|---|---|---|---|
| (Sweden) Stig Blomqvist (K-AM 5265) | 1:25.565 | (Germany) Walter Röhrl (K-AM 4135) | +0:00.084 |

Winner: Stig Blomqvist.

==== Quarterfinal 3 ====
===== Race 1 =====
| Driver A | Time A | Driver B | Time B |
|---|---|---|---|
| (Belgium) Marc Duez | ? | (Finland) Timo Salonen | ? |

===== Race 2 =====
| Driver A | Time A | Driver B | Time B |
|---|---|---|---|
| (Finland) Timo Salonen | ? | (Belgium) Marc Duez | ? |

Winner: Marc Duez.

The last semi-finalist is Walter Röhrl.

=== Semi-finals ===
Cars

Audi Sport Quattro S1 E2 without number plates.

==== Semi-final 1 ====
===== Race 1 =====
First attempt was cancelled due to technical issues with the starting procedure of Marc Duez.

| Driver A | Time A | Driver B | Time B |
|---|---|---|---|
| (Belgium) Marc Duez | +0:03.959 | (Sweden) Stig Blomqvist | 1:23.592 |

===== Race 2 =====
| Driver A | Time A | Driver B | Time B |
|---|---|---|---|
| (Belgium) Marc Duez | +0:01.346 | (Sweden) Stig Blomqvist | 1:22.601 |

Winner: Stig Blomqvist.

==== Semi-final 2 ====
One of couple races ended with the next result:

| Driver A | Time A | Driver B | Time B |
|---|---|---|---|
| (Austria) Sepp Haider | +0:00.169 | (Germany) Walter Röhrl | 1:23.054 |

Winner: Walter Röhrl.

=== Finals ===
Cars

2 Peugeot 205 Turbo 16 E2: plate 287 FPF 75 (FRA) for Walter Röhrl and plate 311 FPF 75 (FRA) for Stig Blomqvist in the first run. Then drivers switched cars for 2nd run.

==== Race 1 ====
| Driver A | Time A | Driver B | Time B |
|---|---|---|---|
| (Sweden) Stig Blomqvist | 1:22.218 | (Germany) Walter Röhrl | +0:01.630 |

==== Race 2 ====
| Driver A | Time A | Driver B | Time B |
|---|---|---|---|
| (Sweden) Stig Blomqvist | 1:21.929 | (Germany) Walter Röhrl | +0:02.893 |

Winner: Stig Blomqvist.
