= 1988 Race of Champions =

Seasons
- ← none 1989 →

The 1988 Race of Champions was the inaugural event and was held on December 4 at the Autodrome de Linas-Montlhéry near Paris, in memory of Henri Toivonen, who died while leading the 1986 Tour de Corse, and to celebrate the tenth anniversary of the world championship for rally drivers. This first event was the only Race of Champions event to feature a more conventional single-car rally stage format.

== Participants ==
The inaugural cast included all the eight world rally champions from 1979 to 1988.

Driver	Reason for Qualification
(Sweden) Björn Waldegård	World Rally champion in 1979
(Germany) Walter Röhrl	World Rally champion in 1980, 1982
(Finland) Ari Vatanen	World Rally champion in 1981
(Finland) Hannu Mikkola	World Rally champion in 1983
(Sweden) Stig Blomqvist	World Rally champion in 1984
(Finland) Timo Salonen	World Rally champion in 1985
(Finland) Juha Kankkunen	World Rally champion in 1986, 1987
(Italy) Miki Biasion	World Rally champion in 1988

== Race of Champions ==
=== Prologue ===
All drivers used BMW M3 (E30)

=== First Qualification round ===
Cars

Ford Sierra RS Cosworth, plate D933 UOO (GBR), for Juha Kankkunen, Miki Biasion, Timo Salonen and Hannu Mikkola.

Ford Sierra RS Cosworth, plate D935 UOO (GBR), for Walter Röhrl, Stig Blomqvist*, Björn Waldegård and Ari Vatanen.

- Note: Stig Blomqvist used this car in Rally of the 1000 Lakes 1987, Lombard RAC Rally 1987, 1000 Lakes Rally 1988, Rallye Sanremo - Rallye d'Italia 1988 and Lombard RAC Rally 1988.

Starting order on stage: Juha Kankkunen, Walter Röhrl, Miki Biasion, Stig Blomqvist, Timo Salonen, Björn Waldegård, Hannu Mikkola and Ari Vatanen.

Pos.	Driver	Time
1	(Sweden) Stig Blomqvist	2:15.99
2	(Finland) Timo Salonen	2:16.45
3	(Finland) Juha Kankkunen	2:17.07
4	(Finland) Ari Vatanen	2:17.61
5	(Italy) Miki Biasion	2:17.79
6	(Germany) Walter Röhrl	2:19.24
7	(Sweden) Björn Waldegård	2:21.04
8	(Finland) Hannu Mikkola	2:22.35

=== Second Qualification round ===
Cars

2 cars Opel Manta 400 with number plates OPEL MANTA.

Starting order on stage: Hannu Mikkola, Björn Waldegård, Walter Röhrl, Miki Biasion, Ari Vatanen, Juha Kankkunen, Timo Salonen and Stig Blomqvist.

Pos.	Driver	Time
1	(Germany) Walter Röhrl	2:17.11
2	(Finland) Timo Salonen	2:17.46
3	(Finland) Juha Kankkunen	2:17.93
4	(Sweden) Stig Blomqvist	2:19.19
5	(Italy) Miki Biasion	2:19.51
6	(Sweden) Björn Waldegård	2:19.63
7	(Finland) Ari Vatanen	2:21.75
8	(Finland) Hannu Mikkola	2:27.62

=== Qualification results ===
Time includes first and second Qualification round

Pos.	Driver	Time
1	(Finland) Timo Salonen	4:34.91
2	(Finland) Juha Kankkunen	4:35.00
3	(Sweden) Stig Blomqvist	4:35.18
4	(Germany) Walter Röhrl	4:36.35
5	(Italy) Miki Biasion	4:37.30
6	(Finland) Ari Vatanen	4:39.36
7	(Sweden) Björn Waldegård	4:40.67
8	(Finland) Hannu Mikkola	4:49.97

=== Semi-final ===
Cars

2 cars Audi Sport Quattro S1 E2 without number plates. Starting order on stage: Walter Röhrl, Stig Blomqvist, Juha Kankkunen and Timo Salonen.

Pos.	Driver	Time
1	(Finland) Juha Kankkunen	3:46.15
2	(Finland) Timo Salonen	3:46.24
3	(Germany) Walter Röhrl	3:49.65
4	(Sweden) Stig Blomqvist	3:53.16

=== Final ===
Starting order on stage: Juha Kankkunen, Timo Salonen

Car 1

Peugeot 205 Turbo 16 E2, plate 290 FPF 75 (FRA)*, for both drivers

- Note: Peugeot 205 Turbo 16 E2 (but another chassis) with this number plate in Rallye Automobile de Monte-Carlo 1986 livery belongs to Juha Kankkunen and was demonstrated by him on Neste Rally Finland 2019 dates.

Pos.	Driver	Time
1	(Finland) Juha Kankkunen	3:41.98
2	(Finland) Timo Salonen	3:43.78

Car 2

Lancia Delta Integrale, plate TO 89092H (ITA) (chassis #417880), for both drivers

Pos.	Driver	Time
1	(Finland) Timo Salonen	3:53.02
2	(Finland) Juha Kankkunen	3:53.68

=== Final results ===
Time includes first and second heats

Pos.	Driver	Time
W	(Finland) Juha Kankkunen	7:35.66
2	(Finland) Timo Salonen	7:36.80
