= 1990 Race of Champions =

Seasons
- ← 1989 1991 →

The 1990 Race of Champions took place on December 8–9 in the Spanish city of Barcelona. It was the third running of the event, and the first year that the International Masters contest was run, allowing up-and-coming rally drivers a chance to mix it with the champions in the main event. Stig Blomqvist retained his title won the previous year, defeating Tommi Makinen in the final.

== Participants ==
Driver	Reason for Qualification
(Spain) Carlos Sainz	World Rally champion in 1990
(Finland) Timo Salonen	World Rally champion in 1985
(Sweden) Stig Blomqvist	World Rally champion in 1984
(Finland) Hannu Mikkola	World Rally champion in 1983
(Finland) Ari Vatanen	World Rally champion in 1981
(Sweden) Björn Waldegård	World Rally champion in 1979
(Finland) Markku Alén	FIA Cup for Drivers winner in 1978
(Sweden) Kenneth Eriksson	Winner in the International Masters
(France) Alain Oreille	Finalist in the International Masters
(France) François Chatriot	Semi-finalists in the International Masters
(Italy) Dario Cerrato	Semi-finalists in the International Masters
(Finland) Tommi Makinen	Replacement for the absent Walter Röhrl

== International Masters ==
Preliminary stages

The 12 participants were split into three groups for the round robin first stage of the contest, with the best three from each progressing along with the driver with the fastest time among the losers. The drivers were split as follows:

- Group A - David Llewellin, Jesús Puras, Kenjiro Shinozuka, Marc Duez (Puras eliminated)
- Group B - Kenneth Eriksson, Alain Oreille, Dario Cerrato, Tommi Makinen (Oreille progresses with best losing time)
- Group C - Armin Schwarz, François Chatriot, Josep Maria Bardolet, Josep Bassas (Schwarz eliminated)

Shinozuka, Llewellin, Bardolet and Bassas were then eliminated in the knockout second round.

Quarter-finals

Winner	Loser
(Italy) Dario Cerrato	(France) Alain Oreille
(Sweden) Kenneth Eriksson	(Finland) Tommi Makinen
(France) François Chatriot	(Belgium) Marc Duez

- Oreille progressed with the best losing time.

Semi-finals
(France) François Chatriot	0
(France) Alain Oreille	1
(Sweden) Kenneth Eriksson	1
(Italy) Dario Cerrato	0

Final
(France) Alain Oreille	1
(Sweden) Kenneth Eriksson	2

== Race of Champions ==
The main event followed the same format as the International Masters. The drivers were split into groups as follows:

- Group A - Hannu Mikkola, Ari Vatanen, Kenneth Eriksson, François Chatriot (Vatanen eliminated)
- Group B - Timo Salonen, Stig Blomqvist, Markku Alén, Dario Cerrato (Alén eliminated)
- Group C - Carlos Sainz, Björn Waldegård, Alain Oreille, Tommi Makinen (Sainz progresses with best losing time)

Second round

Winner	Loser
(Finland) Tommi Makinen	(France) François Chatriot
(Italy) Dario Cerrato	(France) Alain Oreille
(Sweden) Kenneth Eriksson	(Spain) Carlos Sainz
(Sweden) Stig Blomqvist	(Sweden) Björn Waldegård
(Finland) Timo Salonen	(Finland) Hannu Mikkola

- Sainz progressed with the best losing time.

Quarter-finals

Winner	Loser
(Italy) Dario Cerrato	(Finland) Tommi Makinen
(Sweden) Stig Blomqvist	(Sweden) Kenneth Eriksson
(Spain) Carlos Sainz	(Finland) Timo Salonen

- Makinen progressed with the best losing time.

Semi-finals
(Sweden) Stig Blomqvist	2
(Spain) Carlos Sainz	1
(Finland) Tommi Makinen	2
(Italy) Dario Cerrato	1

Final
(Sweden) Stig Blomqvist	2
(Finland) Tommi Makinen	1
