= Race of Champions =

International motorsport event

- Category: Racing and Rally
- Country: International
- Inaugural season: 1988
- Drivers: 20 (2025)
- Teams: 10 (2025)
- Drivers' champion: (France) Sébastien Loeb
- Teams' champion: France
- Official website: raceofchampions.com

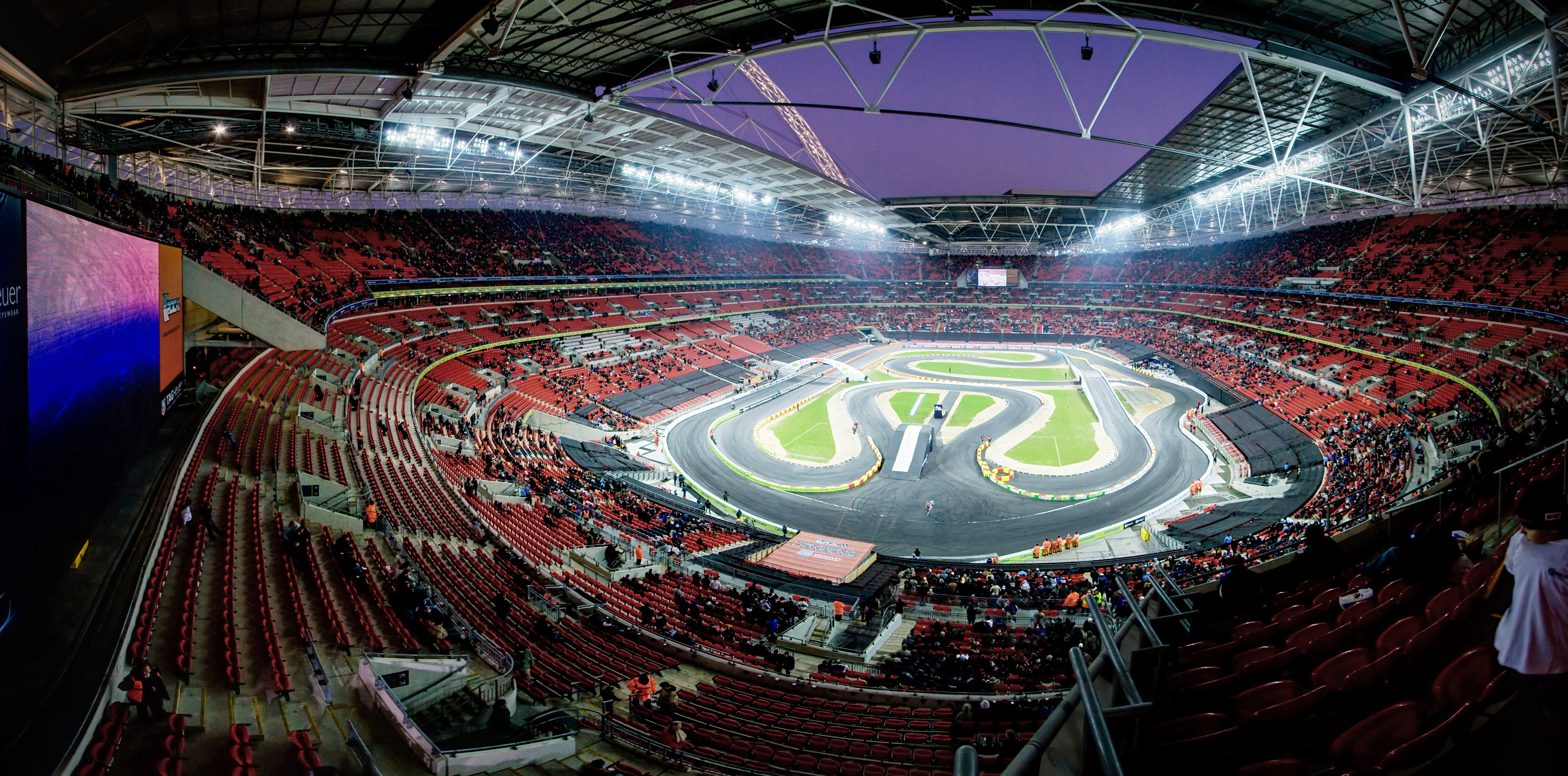
2007 Race of Champions at Wembley Stadium

The Race of Champions (ROC) is an international motorsport event held at the start or end of each year, featuring some of the world's best racing and rally drivers from Formula One, World Rally Championship, IndyCar, NASCAR, sports car racing, touring car racing, and motorcycle racing, who compete against each other in identical cars.

The race was first organised in 1988 by former rally driver Michèle Mouton and Fredrik Johnsson, IMP (International Media Productions) President. Originally the event was a competition between the world's best rally drivers, but has since expanded to include top competitors from most other motorsport disciplines. The top individual overall in the Race of Champions is given the title "Champion of Champions" and receives the Henri Toivonen Memorial Trophy. The ROC Nations' Cup was added in 1999 and now features teams of two drivers who compete for their country.

The event has taken place in several venues, including 12 years on Gran Canaria from 1992 to 2003. From 2004 to 2019, the event was held in major sporting stadiums, including the Stade de France in Paris, Wembley Stadium in London, the Beijing National Stadium, Düsseldorf's ESPRIT arena, the Rajamangala Stadium in Bangkok, Olympic Stadium, the Marlins Park in Miami, the King Fahd International Stadium in Riyadh, and the Foro Sol in Mexico City. However in 2014, the event was held at the Bushy Park circuit in Barbados, and the 2022 edition was held on the frozen Baltic Sea in northern Sweden.

== Overview ==
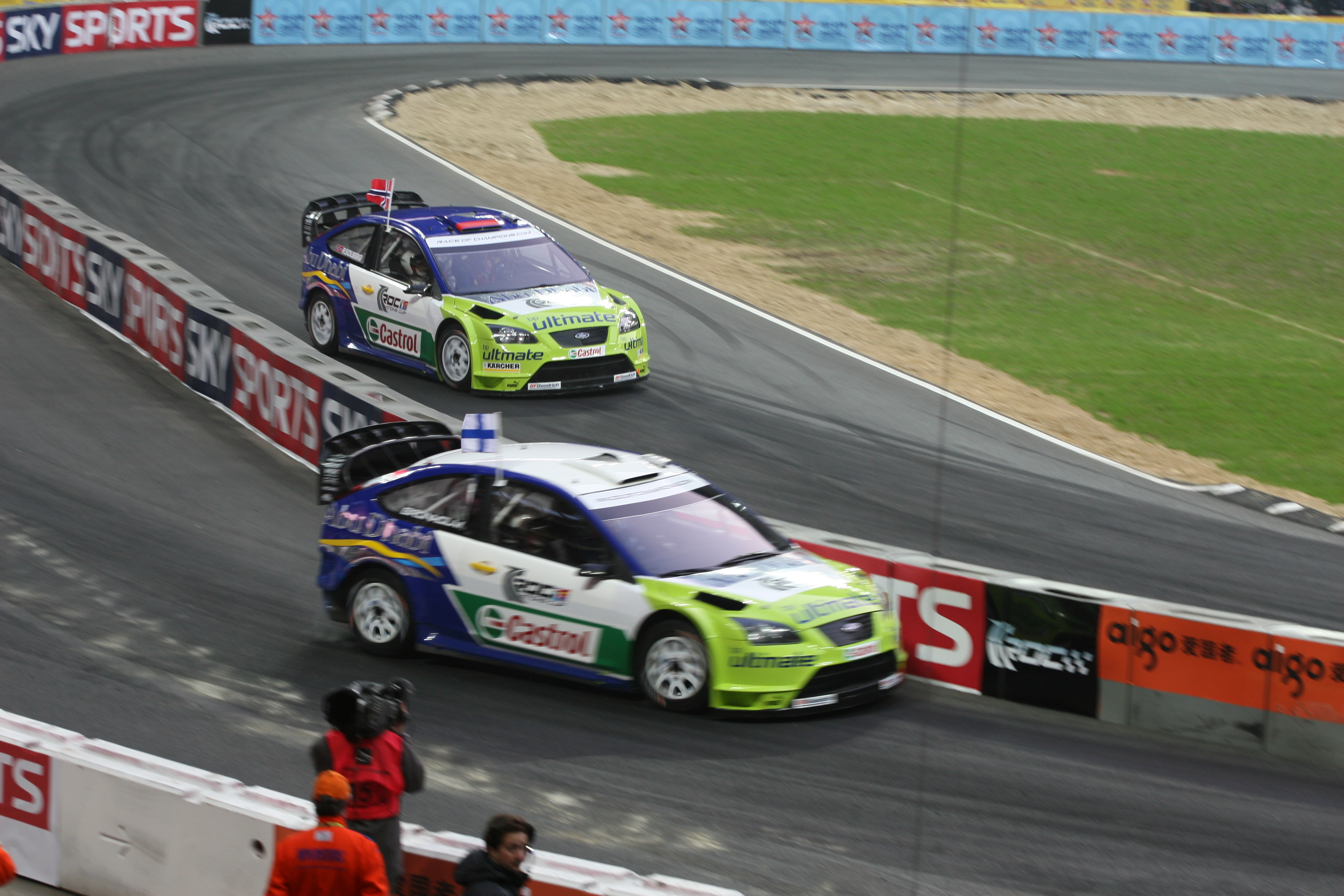
Marcus Grönholm and Henning Solberg driving Ford Focus RS WRC 07 cars at the 2007 Nations' Cup.

In the Race of Champions, the individual drivers compete head-to-head in one race around the track. The drivers are gradually eliminated using a round-robin format, with the best eight entering a knockout tournament. Prior to the Race of Champions, eight teams of two drivers compete in the ROC Nations' Cup using a similar format.

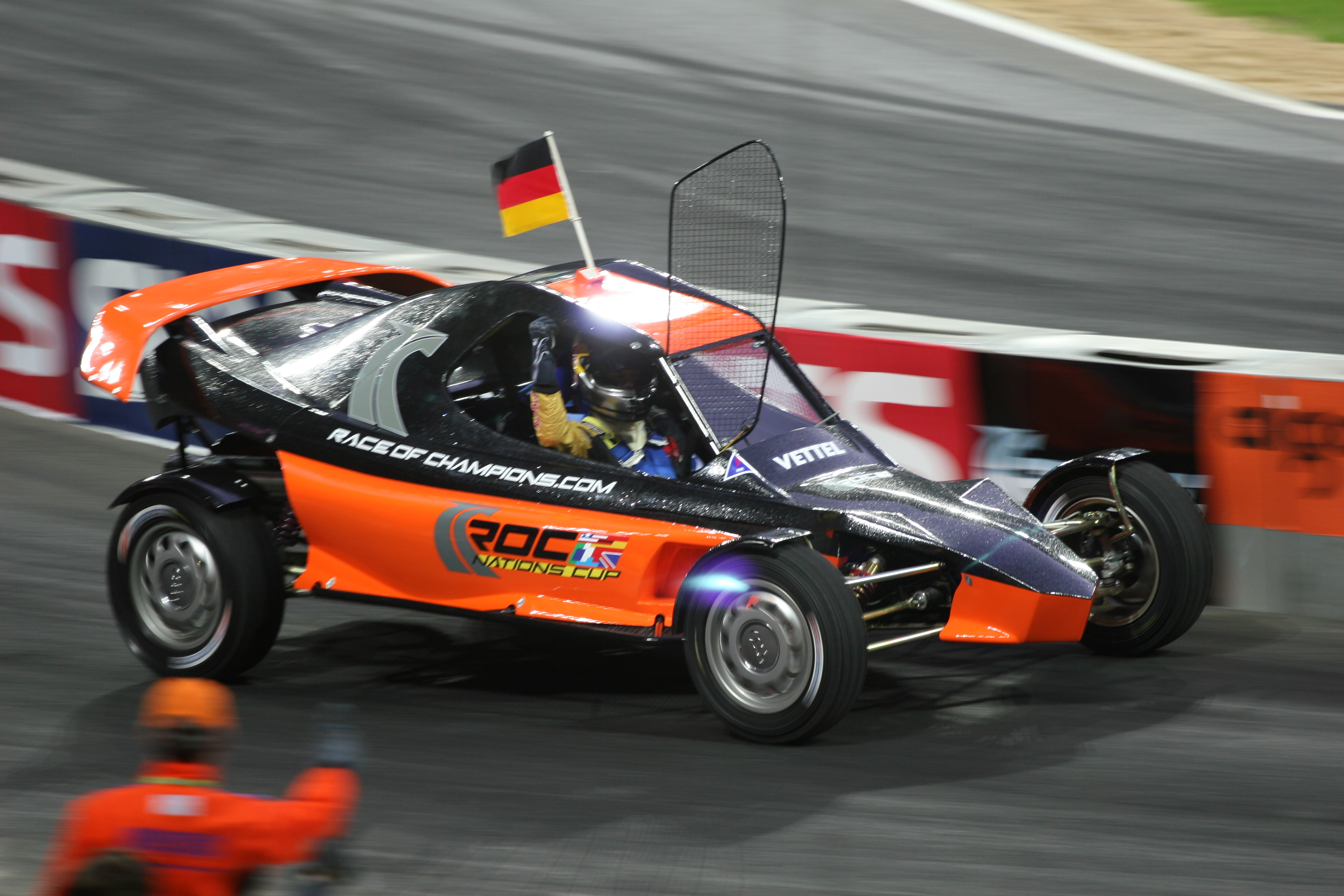
Sebastian Vettel driving the ROC buggy.

In both the ROC Nations' Cup and the Race of Champions, the final consists of three runs, with the team or driver that achieves two victories first crowned champion.

=== Cars ===
The cars used in the Race Of Champions vary from year to year. Prior to each run, a type of car is assigned to both of the drivers, with each machine being mechanically identical. Over the course of the event, each driver will get to drive several different cars.

In 2012, the cars selected for the Race Of Champions included a ROC Car buggy, the KTM X-Bow, the Audi R8 LMS, the Lamborghini Gallardo SuperTrofeo, the VW Scirocco R-Cup and the NASCAR European Stock Car.

In 2022, the cars selected included the FIA RX2e, the Porsche 718 Cayman GT4 Clubsport and the off-road Polaris RZR PRO XP. SuperCar Lites were also used and powered by 100% fossil-free biofuel.

Manufacturer	Model	Years Used	Image
Abarth	Grande Punto S2000	2007	
Abarth	500 Assetto Corse	2008	
Ariel	Atom	2014–2015	
Aston Martin	V8 Vantage Rally GT	2006	
Aston Martin	Vantage N24	2007	
Audi	R8 LMS	2010–2012, 2014	
Chevrolet	Camaro EuroNASCAR	2010–2012, 2014–2015	
Citroën	Xsara WRC	2004–2006	
Ferrari	360 Modena	2004	
Ford	Focus RS WRC	2007–2009	
KTM	X-Bow	2008–2012, 2014–2015	
KTM	X-Bow Comp R	2025	
Lamborghini	Gallardo Super Trofeo	2012	
Mercedes-AMG	GT	2015	
Olsbergs MSE	Supercar Lites	2022, 2025	
Olsbergs MSE	RX2e	2022	
Olsbergs MSE	FC1-X	2022	
Olsbergs MSE	FC2	2025	
Peugeot	307 WRC	2004–2005	
Polaris	RZR	2022	
Polaris	RZR Pro R	2025	
Porsche	911 GT3	2005	
Porsche	911 GT3 RSR	2006	
Porsche	911 GT3 Cup	2010	
Porsche	718 Cayman GT4 Clubsport	2022	
Radical	SR3 RSX	2015	
Renault	Megane Trophy	2005–2006	
RGM	Stadium Super Truck	2014	
ROC	ROC Car	2004–2012, 2014–2015	
ROC	Solution F Prototype	2007–2010	
ROC	RX Racing RX150	2008–2010, 2015	
ROC	2-Seater	2010	
Skoda	Fabia S2000	2011	
SRC	Rage Comet	2015	
Subaru	BRZ tS	2025	
Toyota	GT-86	2012	
Toyota	GR86	2025	
Volkswagen	Scirocco	2009–2012	
Volkswagen	Polo WRX	2014	
VUHL	05 ROC	2017-2021	

== History ==
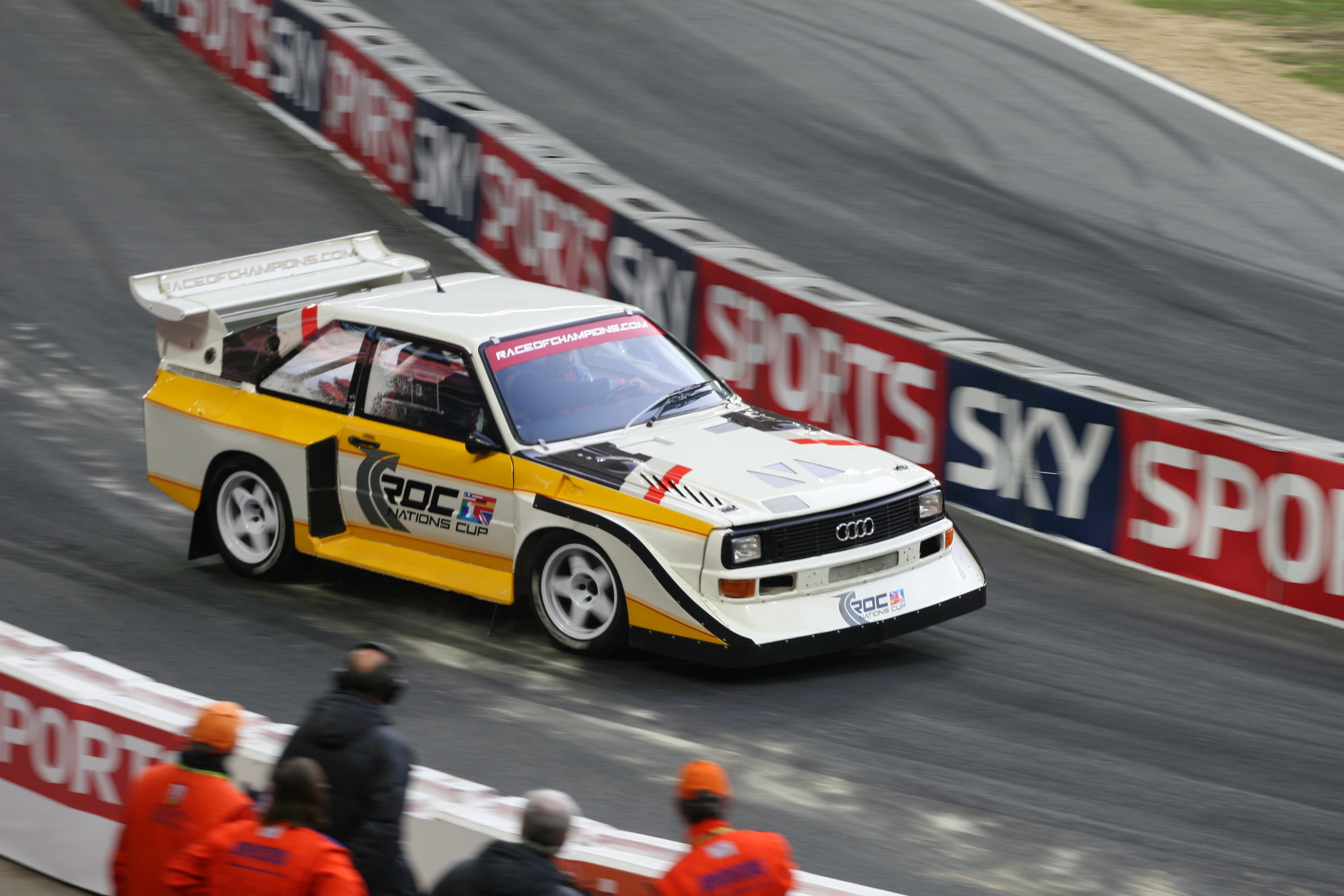
Two-time winner Stig Blomqvist driving an Audi Quattro S1.

=== Early events (1988–1991) ===
The first-ever Race of Champions was held in 1988 at the Autodrome de Linas-Montlhéry near Paris, in memory of Henri Toivonen, who died while leading the 1986 Tour de Corse, and to celebrate the tenth anniversary of the world championship for rally drivers.

The inaugural cast included all the eight world rally champions from 1979 to 1988; Björn Waldegård, Walter Röhrl, Ari Vatanen, Hannu Mikkola, Stig Blomqvist, Timo Salonen, Juha Kankkunen and Miki Biasion. The final was a battle between two "Flying Finns", in which Kankkunen beat Salonen to become the first "Champion of Champions". The cars used at the first event were Audi Quattro S1, BMW M3, Ford Sierra RS Cosworth, Lancia Delta Integrale, Opel Manta 400 and Peugeot 205 Turbo 16.

The following years saw new events in addition to the main race. The International Rally Masters, started in 1990, was designed to offer the season's best drivers, who were yet to win a championship title, the chance to win a spot in the main Race of Champions. The Classic Rally Masters, first contested in 1994, was a "historic" Race of Champions competed with pre-1965 Porsche 911s. These two events have since been discontinued.

From 1989 until 1991, there were one-off appearances at the Nürburgring, Barcelona and Madrid.

=== Gran Canaria (1992–2003) ===
The event found a permanent home for the next 12 years at the Ciudad Deportiva Islas Canarias venue on Gran Canaria starting from 1992. It was during this period that the emphasis on rally champions faded. The Nations' Cup was introduced in 1999, bringing in circuit racing drivers and motorcyclists to the event for the first time, with 2001 marking the first time that non-rally drivers were eligible to compete for the main title.

2003 was the last time the event would be held on Gran Canaria, the event switching to stadium-based tracks from 2004. The change from gravel to tarmac circuits saw rally drivers lose their dominance, and by 2007 only a handful of rally drivers were present, with the majority made up of circuit racing drivers from F1, touring cars and sportscars.

=== Saint-Denis (2004–2006) ===
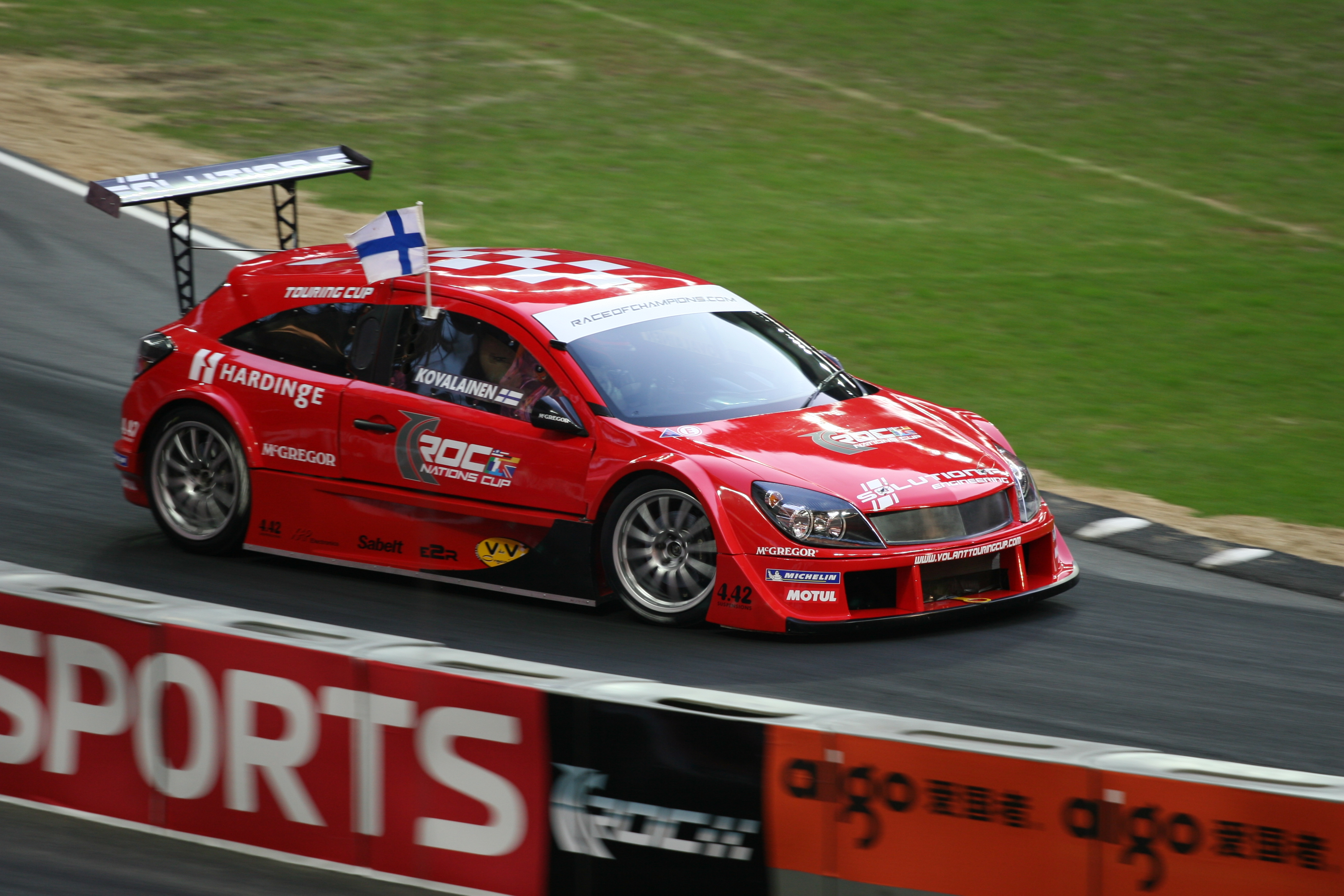
2004 surprise winner Heikki Kovalainen driving a Solution F Prototype at the 2007 event.

The 2004 Race of Champions took place on December 6 at the Stade de France in Saint-Denis. The individual event was won by Heikki Kovalainen, the first non-rally driver to win the crown, and the Nations' Cup by Jean Alesi and Sébastien Loeb representing France. There was also a special "World Champions Challenge" race held between 2004 Formula One world champion Michael Schumacher and 2004 World Rally champion Sébastien Loeb, which Schumacher won.

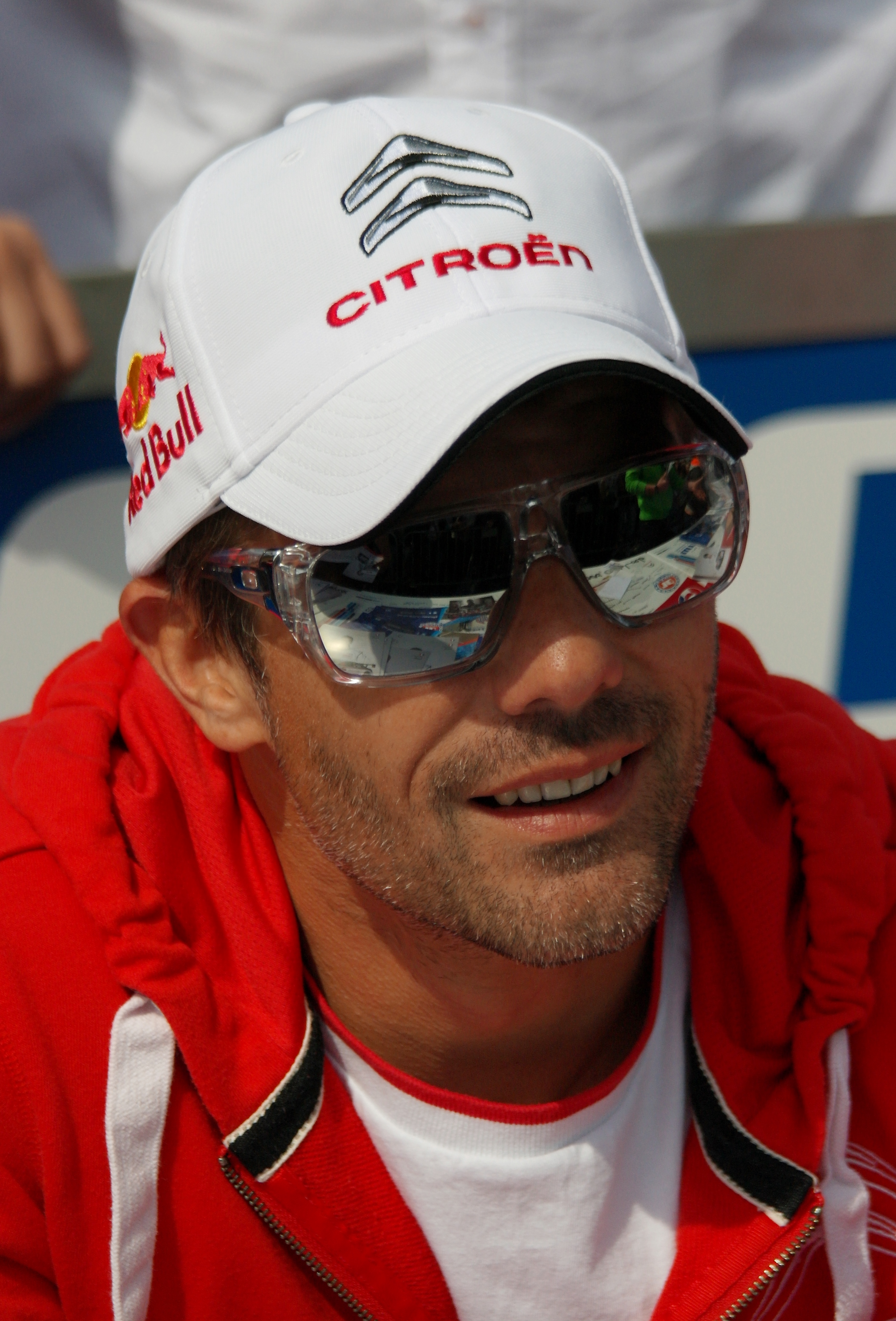
Sébastien Loeb won his second title in 2005.

The 2005 event took place on December 3. The individual event was won by Sébastien Loeb after Tom Kristensen crashed out of the final, and the Nations' Cup event was won by Tom Kristensen and Mattias Ekström representing Scandinavia.

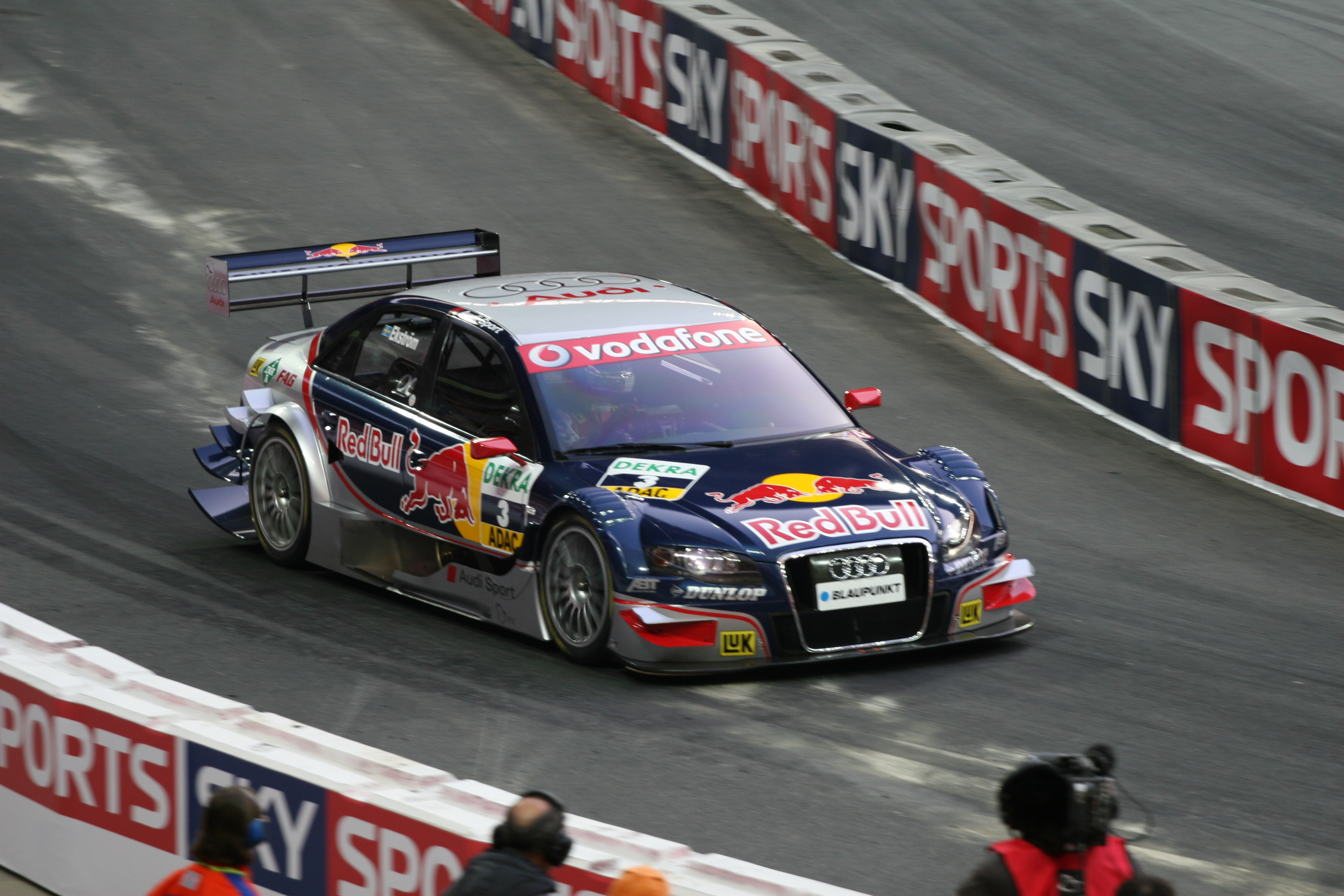
2006 winner Mattias Ekström demonstrating his DTM car at the 2007 event.

The 2006 event took place on December 16. The Nations' Cup was competed first and the event was won by Finland, with Heikki Kovalainen beating United States' Travis Pastrana on the final round. Kovalainen's teammate was the two-time World Rally Champion Marcus Grönholm, whereas Pastrana drove all the rounds for the US team, after both Jimmie Johnson and his replacement, Scott Speed, had to withdraw from competing due to injuries.

The individual event and the Henri Toivonen Memorial Trophy was won by Mattias Ekström of Sweden. He beat Kovalainen by 0.0002 seconds in the semi-finals, and then defending champion, Sébastien Loeb of France, in the finals.

=== London (2007–2008) ===
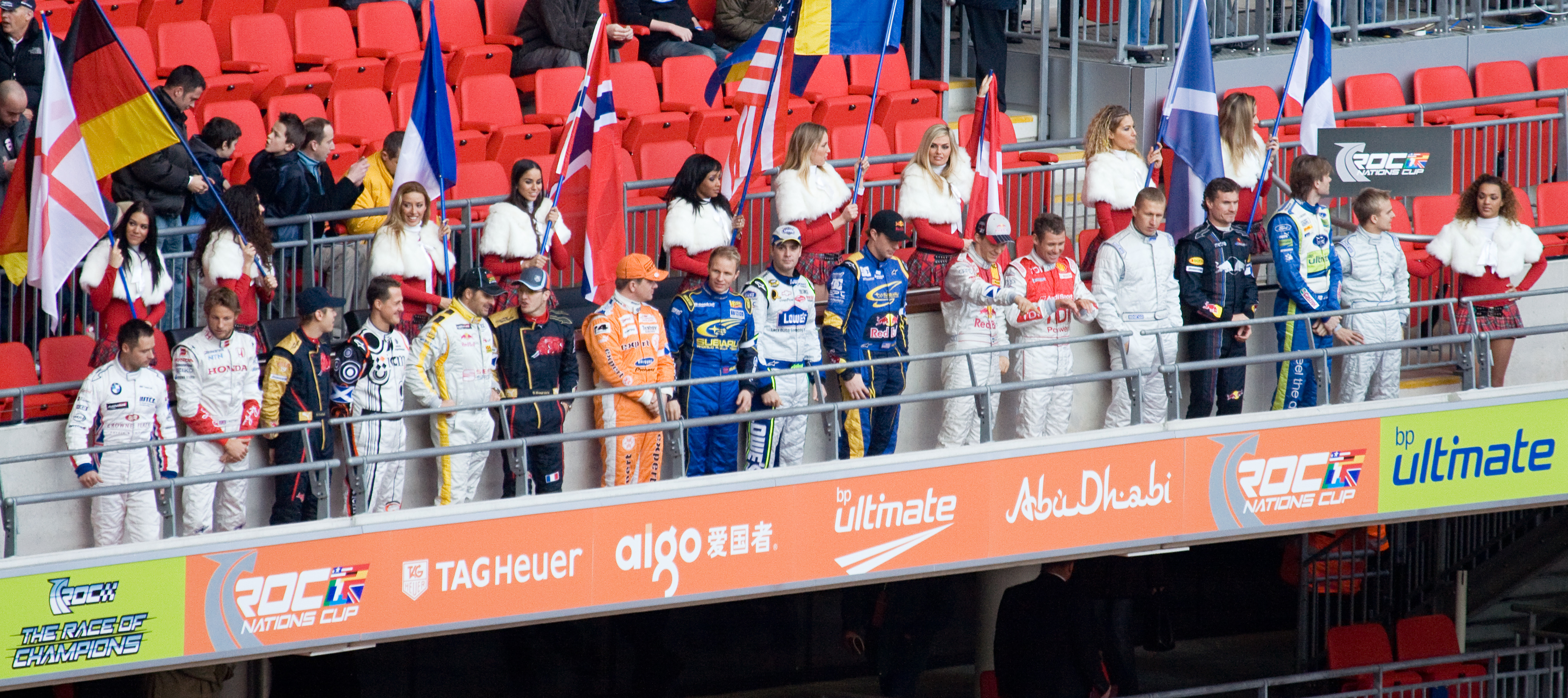
The 16 competitors line up before the start of the event.

The 2007 Race of Champions took place on December 16 at Wembley Stadium in London, England. The Nations' Cup took place at the start of the afternoon and was won by Germany over Finland. The individual event followed and the Henri Toivonen Memorial Trophy was won by Mattias Ekström of Sweden, beating Michael Schumacher of Germany in the final.

The 2008 event took place on December 14. Germany retained their Nations' Cup title by beating the Scandinavian team in the final, while Sébastien Loeb overcame the recently retired F1 stalwart David Coulthard to win the individuals' event.

=== Beijing (2009) ===
The 2009 Race of Champions took place in Beijing's National Stadium on November 3–4. For the first time, regional finals were held to help determine the competitors for the Nations' Cup, with Monaco earning the right to compete in the main event after beating teams from Italy, Spain and Portugal at an event held in Porto on June 6–7.

Germany beat Great Britain to win the Nations' Cup for the third successive time, with Mattias Ekström beating Michael Schumacher to claim the individual title in a re-run of the 2007 final.

=== Düsseldorf (2010–2011) ===
The 2010 Race of Champions took place in Düsseldorf's Esprit Arena on November 27–28. Germany retained their Nations' Cup crown in front of their home crowd, once again beating Great Britain, while Portugal's Filipe Albuquerque was a surprise winner of the individual event after beating newly crowned F1 champion Sebastian Vettel in the semi-final and Sébastien Loeb in the final.

The 2011 event was due to take place in Frankfurt's Commerzbank-Arena on December 3–4, but after Eintracht Frankfurt's relegation to German football's Second Division, the stadium could no longer host the event on those dates. The Race of Champions was held in the Esprit Arena in Düsseldorf, just as in 2010.

Germany secured their fifth successive Nations' Cup title, beating the Nordic team in the final, while up-and-coming rally star Sébastien Ogier beat Le Mans legend Tom Kristensen in the final to clinch the individual crown.

=== Bangkok (2012–2013) ===
The 2012 Race of Champions took place on December 14–16 at the Rajamangala Stadium in Bangkok, Thailand. The individual Race Of Champions was won by Lotus F1 driver Romain Grosjean, who beat Tom Kristensen in the final. The Nations' Cup was won for the sixth consecutive time by Germany after overcoming France in the final.

The 2012 edition was the first to include a ROC Asia competition, with teams from host nation Thailand, India, China and Japan battling for two spots in the ROC Nations Cup and individual seats in the actual Race Of Champions.

The 2013 event was due to take place on the December 14–15 at the Rajamangala Stadium in Bangkok, Thailand, but was canceled due to political unrest in Bangkok.

=== Barbados (2014) ===
The 2014 Race of Champions was held in Barbados at the Bushy Park circuit on December 13–14. This was the first time that the event was held in North America. The individual Race Of Champions was won by 13 times F1 race winner David Coulthard, who beat Mercedes F1 test driver and youngest ever DTM race winner Pascal Wehrlein in the final. The Nations' Cup was won by Team Nordic's Tom Kristensen and Petter Solberg overcoming Team Great Britain's David Coulthard and Susie Wolff in the final.

The 2014 included a ROC Caribbean competition, with teams from host nation Barbados, Jamaica, Guyana and Trinidad and Tobago battling for two spots in the ROC Nations Cup and individual seats in the actual Race Of Champions.

=== London (2015) ===
In 2015 Race of Champions returned to London and was staged at London Stadium in Stratford. The ROC Nations Cup was held on Friday 20 November and the Race of Champions on Saturday 21 November.

Drivers included four times Formula One World Champion Sebastian Vettel, nine times 24 Hours of Le Mans winner Tom Kristensen and FIA World Rallycross Championship winner Petter Solberg. The ROC Nations Cup was won by Team England 1 consisting of Jason Plato and Andy Priaulx, while Sebastian Vettel was crowned Champion of Champions.

=== Miami (2017) ===
The 2017 Race of Champions was held at Marlins Park in Miami, Florida, on January 21–22. This was the Second time that the event was held in North America. Fifteen drivers from six nations competed at the 2017 ROC. Drivers included 2015 NASCAR Sprint Cup Champion Kyle Busch, and former Indy 500 Champion Juan Pablo Montoya, who each participated in their first ROC.

Juan Pablo Montoya was crowned the Champion of Champions after defeating Tom Kristensen, while Sebastian Vettel won the Nations Cup for Team Germany after teammate Pascal Wehrlein did not compete in the Nations Cup after suffering an accident during the Champion of Champions event the day prior. Team USA drivers Kurt Busch and Kyle Busch were the runners up for the Nations Cup.

=== Riyadh (2018) ===
The 2018 Race of Champions was held at the King Fahd International Stadium in Riyadh, becoming the first international motorsports event to be held in Saudi Arabia.

This was the first edition to feature eROC, where sim racers competed against each other both virtually and on the ROC track for the chance to compete in the main Race of Champions event.

=== Mexico City (2019) ===
The 2019 Race of Champions was held at the Foro Sol in Mexico City, becoming the third Race of Champions to be held in North America.

=== Virtual (2020) ===
The 2020 Race of Champions was held virtually due to the COVID-19 pandemic at simulations of the Gran Canaria track and the Riyadh and London stadium tracks that were all recreated in Assetto Corsa.

=== Sweden (2022–2023) ===
The 2022 Race of Champions was held at Pite Havsbad in Piteå, northern Sweden. It was the first time the event had been held on a snow and ice track. The 2023 Race of Champions was held at the same venue.

=== Sydney (2025) ===
The 2025 Race of Champions was held on 7–8 March at Stadium Australia in Sydney. This was the first time the event was hosted in the Southern Hemisphere.

=== Wellington (2027) ===
The 2027 Race of Champions will be held on 9–10 January at Wellington Regional Stadium in Wellington. This will be the second time the event is hosted in the Southern Hemisphere.

== Winners ==
Year	Location	Race of Champions		Nations' Cup winners		Other trophies
Year	Location	Winner	Runner-up	Nation	Drivers	Other trophies
1988	(France) Paris	(Finland) Juha Kankkunen	(Finland) Timo Salonen	Not held		None held
1989	(West Germany) Nürburgring	(Sweden) Stig Blomqvist	(West Germany) Walter Röhrl	Not held		None held
1990	(Spain) Barcelona	(Sweden) Stig Blomqvist	(Finland) Tommi Mäkinen	Not held		(Sweden) Kenneth Eriksson (Rally Masters)
1991	(Spain) Madrid	(Finland) Juha Kankkunen	(France) Didier Auriol	Not held		(Spain) Josep Maria Bardolet (Rally Masters)
1992	(Spain) Gran Canaria	(Italy) Andrea Aghini	(United Kingdom) Colin McRae	Not held		(Spain) Flavio Alonso (Rally Masters)
1993	(Spain) Gran Canaria	(France) Didier Auriol	(Spain) Carlos Sainz	Not held		(Sweden) Stig Blomqvist (Rally Masters)
1994	(Spain) Gran Canaria	(France) Didier Auriol	(Sweden) Stig Blomqvist	Not held		(Finland) Timo Salonen (Rally Masters) (France) Jean-Louis Schlesser (Classic Masters)
1995	(Spain) Gran Canaria	(France) François Delecour	(United Kingdom) Colin McRae	Not held		(Italy) Andrea Aghini (Rally Masters) (Belgium) Marc Duez (Classic Masters)
1996	(Spain) Gran Canaria	(France) Didier Auriol	(France) François Delecour	Not held		(Spain) Flavio Alonso (Rally Masters)
1997	(Spain) Gran Canaria	(Spain) Carlos Sainz	(United Kingdom) Colin McRae	Not held		(Finland) Jarmo Kytölehto (Rally Masters) (Germany) Walter Röhrl (Classic Masters)
1998	(Spain) Gran Canaria	(United Kingdom) Colin McRae	(United Kingdom) Alister McRae	Not held		(United Kingdom) Alister McRae (Rally Masters) (Italy) Miki Biasion (Classic Masters)
1999	(Spain) Gran Canaria	(France) Didier Auriol	(Finland) Tommi Mäkinen	Finland	Tommi Mäkinen; JJ Lehto; Kari Tiainen	(Germany) Armin Schwarz (Rally Masters) (Sweden) Stig Blomqvist (ROC Legends)
2000	(Spain) Gran Canaria	(Finland) Tommi Mäkinen	(Finland) Marcus Grönholm	France	Regis Laconi; Yvan Muller; Gilles Panizzi	(Germany) Armin Schwarz (Rally Masters) (Sweden) Stig Blomqvist (ROC Legends)
2001	(Spain) Gran Canaria	(Finland) Harri Rovanperä	(Germany) Armin Schwarz	Spain	Jesús Puras; Rubén Xaus; Fernando Alonso	(Belgium) François Duval (Junior Rally Masters) (Sweden) Stig Blomqvist (ROC Legends)
2002	(Spain) Gran Canaria	(Finland) Marcus Grönholm	(France) Sébastien Loeb	United States	Jimmie Johnson; Jeff Gordon; Colin Edwards	(Belgium) François Duval (Junior Rally Masters)
2003	(Spain) Gran Canaria	(France) Sébastien Loeb	(Finland) Marcus Grönholm	(Spain) (Brazil) (France) All-Stars	Fonsi Nieto; Cristiano da Matta; Gilles Panizzi	(Belgium) François Duval (Junior Rally Masters)
2004	(France) Saint-Denis	(Finland) Heikki Kovalainen	(France) Sébastien Loeb	France	Jean Alesi; Sébastien Loeb	None held
2005	(France) Saint-Denis	(France) Sébastien Loeb	(Denmark) Tom Kristensen	(Denmark) (Sweden) Scandinavia	Tom Kristensen; Mattias Ekström	None held
2006	(France) Saint-Denis	(Sweden) Mattias Ekström	(France) Sébastien Loeb	Finland	Heikki Kovalainen; Marcus Grönholm	None held
2007	(United Kingdom) London	(Sweden) Mattias Ekström	(Germany) Michael Schumacher	Germany	Michael Schumacher; Sebastian Vettel	None held
2008	(United Kingdom) London	(France) Sébastien Loeb	(United Kingdom) David Coulthard	Germany	Michael Schumacher; Sebastian Vettel	None held
2009	(China) Beijing	(Sweden) Mattias Ekström	(Germany) Michael Schumacher	Germany	Michael Schumacher; Sebastian Vettel	Ho-Pin Tung (ROC China) (United Kingdom) Andy Priaulx (ROC Legends)
2010	(Germany) Düsseldorf	(Portugal) Filipe Albuquerque	(France) Sébastien Loeb	Germany	Michael Schumacher; Sebastian Vettel	None held
2011	(Germany) Düsseldorf	(France) Sébastien Ogier	(Denmark) Tom Kristensen	Germany	Michael Schumacher; Sebastian Vettel	(Germany) Heinz-Harald Frentzen (ROC Legends)
2012	(Thailand) Bangkok	(France) Romain Grosjean	(Denmark) Tom Kristensen	Germany	Michael Schumacher; Sebastian Vettel	India (ROC Asia); Nattavude Charoensukawattana (ROC Thailand)
2013	(Thailand) Bangkok	Cancelled due to political unrest during the 2013-2014 Thai political crisis				
2014	(Barbados) Bushy Park	(United Kingdom) David Coulthard	(Germany) Pascal Wehrlein	(Denmark) (Norway) Nordic	Tom Kristensen; Petter Solberg	Barbados (ROC Caribbean) (France) Esteban Ocon (ROC Skills Challenge)
2015	(United Kingdom) London	(Germany) Sebastian Vettel	(Denmark) Tom Kristensen	England 1	Jason Plato; Andy Priaulx	(United Kingdom) Chris Hoy (ROC Celebrity Skills Challenge)
2016	No race held (event was changed from late to early year)					
2017	(United States) Miami	(Colombia) Juan Pablo Montoya	(Denmark) Tom Kristensen	Germany	Sebastian Vettel; Pascal Wehrlein	(Norway) Petter Solberg (ROC Skills Challenge)
2018	(Saudi Arabia) Riyadh	(United Kingdom) David Coulthard	(Norway) Petter Solberg	Germany	Timo Bernhard; René Rast	(Sweden) Johan Kristoffersson (ROC Skills Challenge) (Italy) Enzo Bonito (eROC)
2019	Mexico City	(Mexico) Benito Guerra	(France) Loïc Duval	(Sweden) (Denmark) Nordic	Johan Kristoffersson; Tom Kristensen	(United Kingdom) James Baldwin (eROC) (Germany) Sebastian Vettel (ROC Skills Challenge); Rubén Garcia Jr (ROC Mexico Race 1); Abraham Calderón (ROC Mexico Race 2) (United States) Robby Gordon (Super Stadium Trucks Race 1) (Australia) Matthew Brabham (Super Stadium Trucks Race 2)
2020	Online (virtual)	(Sweden) Timmy Hansen	(Mexico) Rubén García Jr.	(United Kingdom) (France) All-Stars	James Baldwin; Romain Grosjean	(United Kingdom) James Baldwin (eROC)
2021	No race held due to COVID-19 pandemic					
2022	(Sweden) Piteå	(France) Sébastien Loeb	(Germany) Sebastian Vettel	Norway	Petter Solberg; Oliver Solberg	(Netherlands) Jarno Opmeer (eROC) (Sweden) Pontus Fredricsson (Porsche ROC Snow + Ice Challenge) (Norway) Aksel Lund Svindal (ROC Celebrity Challenge)
2023	(Sweden) Piteå	(Sweden) Mattias Ekström	(Germany) Mick Schumacher	Norway	Petter Solberg; Oliver Solberg	(United Kingdom) Lucas Blakeley (eROC)
2024	No race held due to uncertainties regarding the use of the land in Piteå					
2025	(Australia) Sydney	(France) Sébastien Loeb	(Australia) Chaz Mostert	France	Sébastien Loeb; Victor Martins	(Greece) Michael Romanidis (eROC)
2026	No race held					
2027	(New Zealand) Wellington					

== Total wins ==
Champion of Champions

Driver (20)	Victories
(France) Sébastien Loeb	5
(France) Didier Auriol	4
(Sweden) Mattias Ekström	4
(Sweden) Stig Blomqvist	2
(Finland) Juha Kankkunen	2
(United Kingdom) David Coulthard	2
(Colombia) Juan Pablo Montoya	1
(Spain) Carlos Sainz	1
(Finland) Tommi Mäkinen	1
(Finland) Harri Rovanperä	1
(Finland) Marcus Grönholm	1
(Finland) Heikki Kovalainen	1
(France) François Delecour	1
(France) Romain Grosjean	1
(France) Sébastien Ogier	1
(Italy) Andrea Aghini	1
(Germany) Sebastian Vettel	1
(Mexico) Benito Guerra	1
(Portugal) Filipe Albuquerque	1
(Sweden) Timmy Hansen	1
(United Kingdom) Colin McRae	1

Nations' Cup

Country/Team (16)	Victories
Germany	8
France	3
(France) (Spain) (Brazil) (United Kingdom) All-Stars	2
Finland	2
(Denmark) (Sweden) (Norway) Nordic	2
Norway	2
Spain	1
United States	1
(Denmark) (Sweden) Scandinavia	1
England	1

Combined wins

Driver	Victories
(Germany) Sebastian Vettel	9 (1+7+1)
(France) Sébastien Loeb	7 (5+2)
(Germany) Michael Schumacher	6 (0+6)

== See also ==
- Race of Champions (Brands Hatch)
- International Race of Champions
