= Vaj =

Vaj may refer to:

- Vaj, Isfahan
- Vaj (street artist)
- vaj, ISO 639-3 and ISO 639-2 code for Sekele language

== See also ==
- VAG (disambiguation)
- Vaghela
- Vaghel
