= VAG =

VAG or vag may refer to:

- Freiburger Verkehrs AG, the municipal transport company of the city of Freiburg, Germany
- IBM VisualAge Generator, a platform-independent programming code generator
- The Vancouver Art Gallery in Vancouver, British Columbia, Canada
- A slang term for vagina, pronounced "vadge"
- The Victoria Art Gallery in Bath, Somerset, England.
- Vag, a dramatic and humorous skit, part of Tamasha musical theatre of Maharashtra
- Versova-Andher-Ghatkopar, a line on the Mumbai Metro in India
- Vereinigte Astronomische Gesellschaft, United Astronomical Society
- Volkswagen Aktiengesellschaft, the German name for the automaker Volkswagen Group
- VAG Rounded, a text font designed for Volkswagen Group in 1979
- Våg, an old Scandinavian unit of mass
- Verkehrs-Aktiengesellschaft Nürnberg (VAG or VAGN), the municipal transport company of the city of Nuremberg, Germany
- Volkswagen Group

== See also ==
- Vaj (disambiguation)
