= Stig Blomqvist =

Swedish rally driver (born 1946)

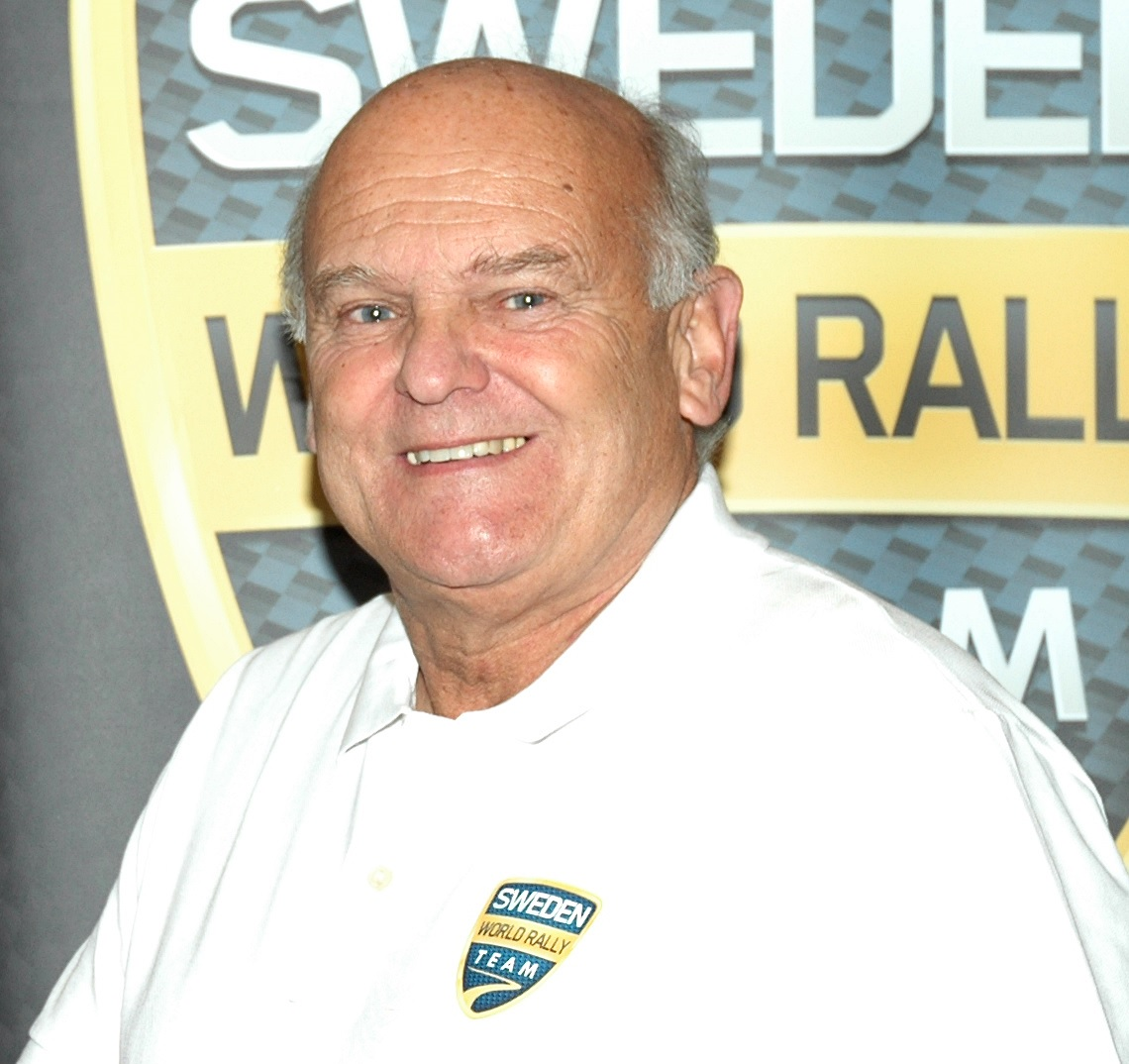
- Blomqvist in January 2012
- Born: Stig Lennart Bolmqvist; 29 July 1946 (age 80); Örebro, Sweden
- Children: Tom Blomqvist

Personal information
- Nationality: (Sweden) Swedish

World Rally Championship record
- Years active: 1973–2006
- Co-driver: (Sweden) Arne Hertz (Sweden) Hans Sylvan (United States) "Vicki" (Sweden) Björn Cederberg (Sweden) Bruno Berglund (Sweden) Benny Melander (Venezuela) Ana Goñi (New Zealand) Rob Scott (Sweden) Ragnar Spjuth
- Teams: Saab, Talbot, Audi, Ford, Peugeot, Volkswagen, Nissan, Škoda
- Rallies: 122
- Championships: 1 (1984)
- Rally wins: 11
- Podiums: 33
- Stage wins: 486
- Total points: 573
- First rally: 1973 Swedish Rally
- First win: 1973 Swedish Rally
- Last win: 1984 Rallye Côte d'Ivoire
- Last rally: 2006 Swedish Rally

Stig Lennart Blomqvist (born 29 July 1946) is a Swedish retired rally driver. He made his international breakthrough in 1981. Driving an Audi Quattro for the Audi factory team, Blomqvist won the World Rally Championship drivers' title in 1984 and finished runner-up in 1985. He won his home event, the Swedish Rally, seven times.

Outside the WRC, Blomqvist won the British Rally Championship in 1983 and the Swedish Rally Championship several times. At the Race of Champions, Blomqvist took the title "Champion of Champions" in 1989 and 1990.

== Career ==
Blomqvist acquired his driving licence at the age of 18, and immediately took second place in a 1964 local rally event near the Swedish town of Karlstad, behind the wheel of a Saab 96. After his education as a driving instructor, together with later teammate Per Eklund at the Kvinnersta Folkhögskola outside of Örebro, he proceeded to drive with the Saab team, and achieved his first international victories in 1971; first winning the Swedish Rally, then the 1000 Lakes Rally in Finland and the RAC Rally in Great Britain. These performances helped Saab gain second place behind Alpine-Renault in the International Championship for Manufacturers, the predecessor to the World Rally Championship.

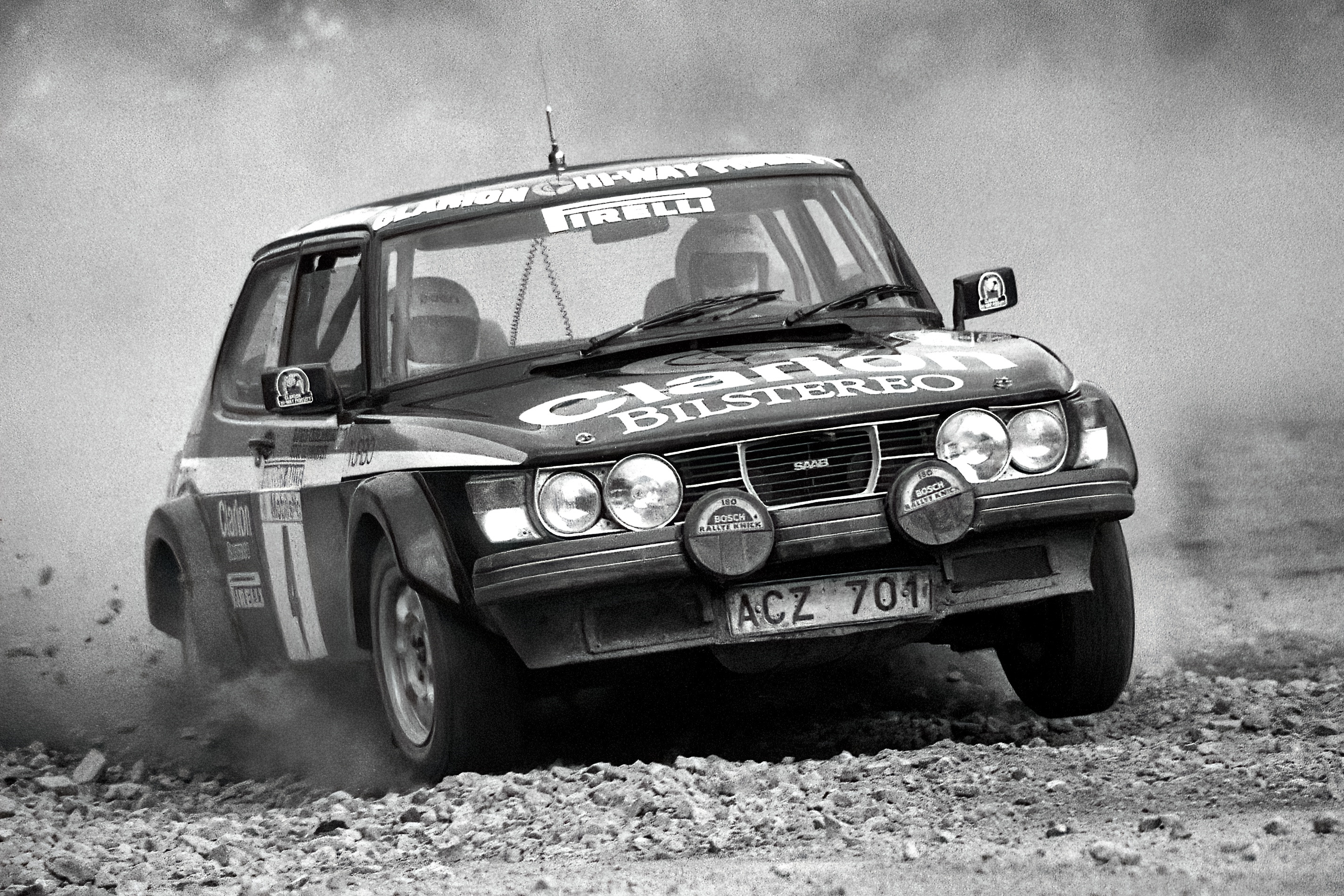
Blomqvist in the Saab 99 Turbo (Hunsrück-Rallye 1980)

Blomqvist went on to win the Swedish Rally again in 1972 (Saab 96 V4), 1973 (Saab 96 V4), which marked his first WRC event and win, 1977 (Saab 99 EMS) and 1979 (Saab 99 Turbo). Outside the WRC, he won the 1973 Cyprus Rally, the 1976 Boucles de Spa and the Swedish Rally Championship several times. His long-time association with Saab ended when the Saab Sport department hung up their spurs in 1981. Driving a Talbot Sunbeam Lotus in 1981, Blomqvist finished eighth in the 1000 Lakes and third at the RAC.

For the 1982 season, Audi Sport, Audi's factory team, signed Blomqvist to drive the Quattro in a few events alongside Hannu Mikkola and Michèle Mouton. He won the Swedish Rally, finished second in the 1000 Lakes and then took his first WRC victory outside his home country by winning the Rallye Sanremo. Audi then signed Blomqvist as their third regular driver for the following season. Blomqvist scored seven podiums, including a win in the season-ending RAC Rally, and finished fourth in the drivers' world championship. In the British Rally Championship, he captured the title by winning four of the six events.

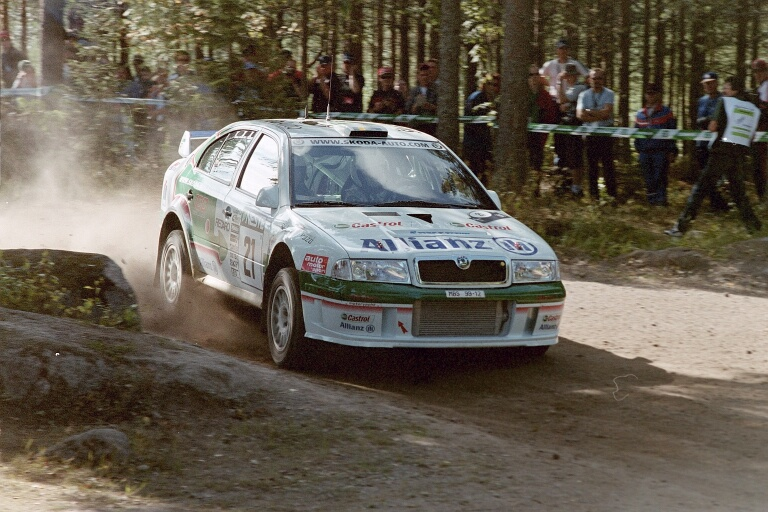
Blomqvist driving the Škoda Octavia WRC at the 2001 Rally Finland

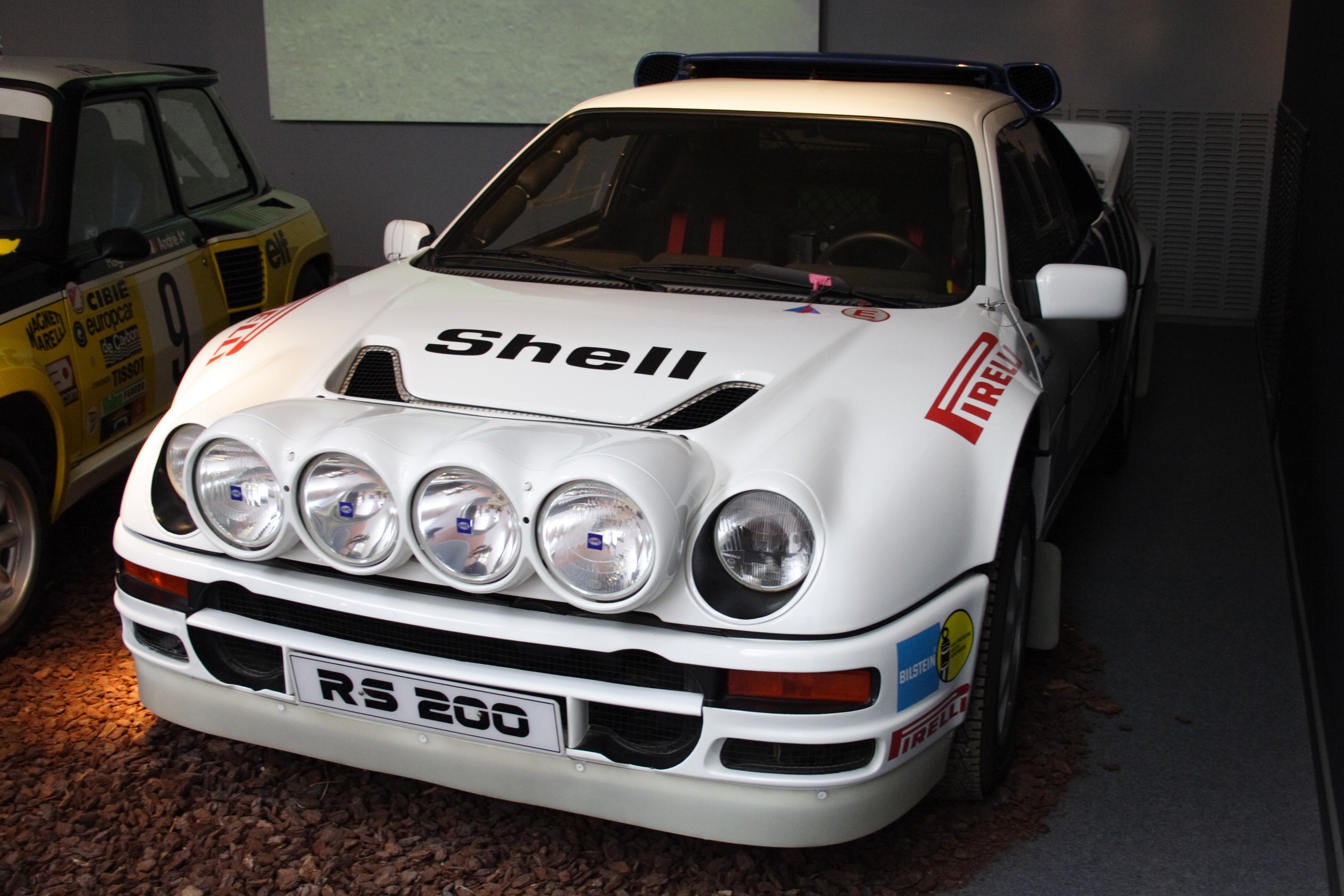
An ex-Blomqvist Ford RS200

In the 1984 season, Blomqvist drove the Quattro A2 and the Sport Quattro evolutions to five victories, and finished second at the Monte Carlo Rally. Beating Mikkola to the title, he became the second Swedish world rally champion after Björn Waldegård. His first place in the Rallye Côte d'Ivoire would remain his career-last victory in the WRC. The 1985 season saw him finish runner-up to Timo Salonen of the new Peugeot Talbot Sport team headed by Jean Todt. His best result was second; at the Swedish Rally, the 1000 Lakes and the Acropolis Rally. In the last Group B season in 1986, Blomqvist competed for Ford in an RS200 and for Peugeot in a 205 Turbo 16 E2, recording his only podium at the Rally Argentina.

During the first two Group A years, Blomqvist continued with Ford and drove a Ford Sierra RS Cosworth, finishing on the podium three times. He also drove for Volkswagen Motorsport and finished third in a Golf Mk 2 16V on the 1989 Safari Rally.The 1990 WRC season was the series' first without Blomqvist in action. In 1991 and 1992, he drove a Nissan Sunny GTI-R for Nissan Motorsports Europe, Nissan's factory team. At the 1992 Swedish Rally, Blomqvist took third place, which would remain his last podium spot in the WRC.

Later in the 1990s, Blomqvist used his experience of two-wheel drive cars and helped Škoda Motorsport to develop the Škoda Felicia Kit Car. During a guest appearance at the 1996 RAC Rally, when the event was not on the WRC schedule, the 50-year-old veteran finished third overall with the car. That same year, he finished seventh in the Safari Rally in a Ford Escort RS Cosworth. This would remain his last points-finish in the World Rally Championship.

After only three events in four years, Blomqvist returned to the role of a regular WRC competitor. Together with co-driver Ana Goñi, he drove a Group N category David Sutton Cars Mitsubishi Lancer Evo 6 in twelve events in 2001, finishing fifth overall in the Production World Rally Championship (PWRC). In 2003, he finished third in the PWRC championship in a Subaru Impreza WRX STI. In his last world rally, the 2006 Swedish Rally, Blomqvist drove the Impreza to 24th place overall and was fourth fastest in Group N.

In September 2008, Blomqvist was due to take part in the Colin McRae Forest Stages Rally, a round of the Scottish Rally Championship centred in Perth in Scotland, in a Ford Escort Mk2 with Goñi as his co-driver. The rally was held in memory of McRae, who died in 2007.

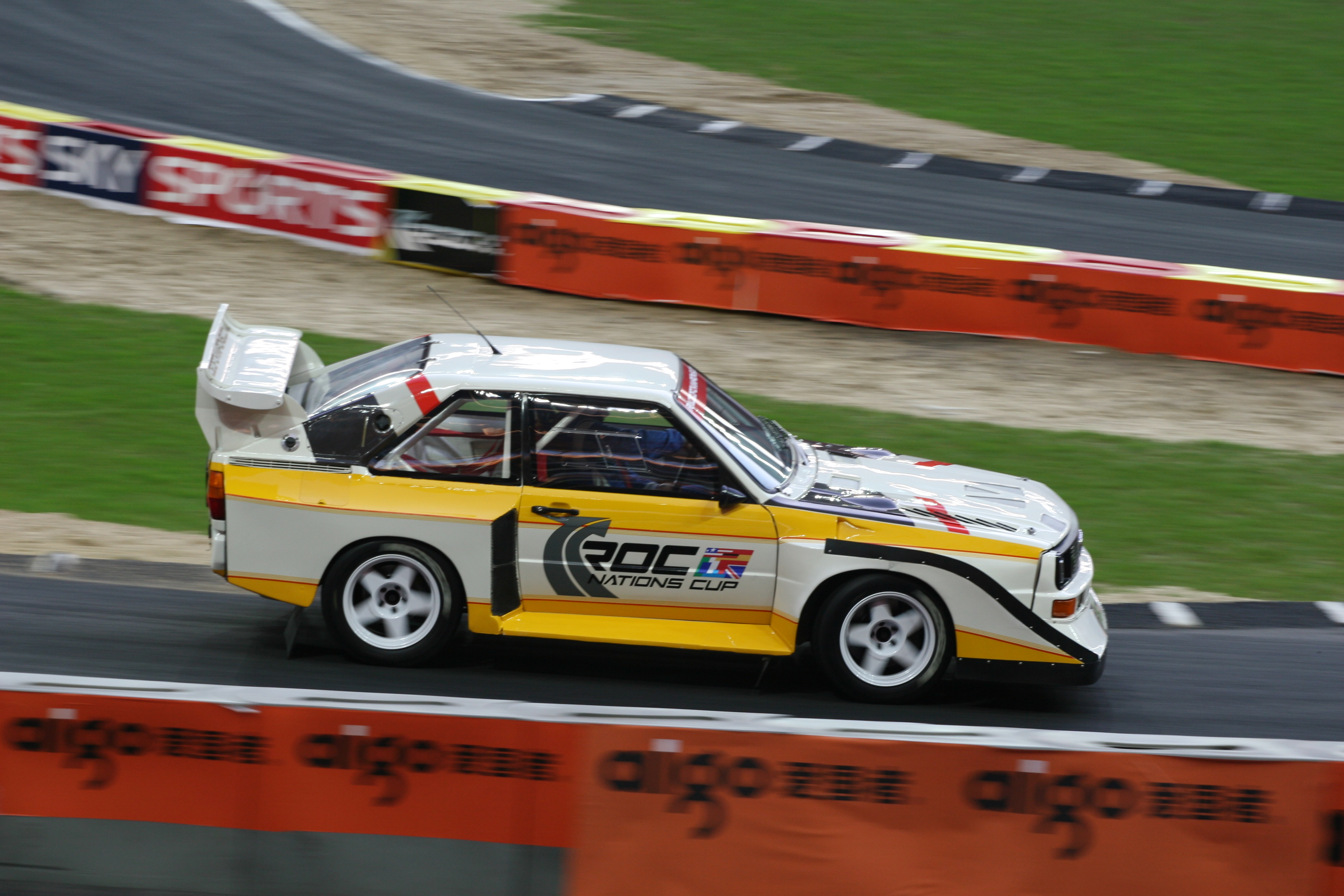
Blomqvist driving a Quattro at the 2007 Race of Champions

Blomqvist has lived in the UK for many years, based in Saffron Walden, Essex. His son, Tom Blomqvist, has followed in his motorsports footsteps, becoming the youngest ever Formula Renault UK champion in 2010, at the age of 16. Tom currently competes in the IMSA SportsCar Championship for Meyer Shank Racing and has competed in IndyCar for the team in 2023 and the 2024 seasons.

== WRC victories ==
#	Event	Season	Co-driver	Car
1	(Sweden) Swedish Rally	1973	Arne Hertz	Saab 96 V4
2	(Sweden) Swedish Rally	1977	Hans Sylvan	Saab 99 EMS
3	(Sweden) Swedish Rally	1979	Björn Cederberg	Saab 99 Turbo
4	(Sweden) Swedish Rally	1982	Björn Cederberg	Audi Quattro
5	(Italy) Rallye Sanremo	1982	Björn Cederberg	Audi Quattro
6	(United Kingdom) RAC Rally	1983	Björn Cederberg	Audi Quattro A2
7	(Sweden) Swedish Rally	1984	Björn Cederberg	Audi Quattro A2
8	(Greece) Acropolis Rally	1984	Björn Cederberg	Audi Quattro A2
9	Rally of New Zealand	1984	Björn Cederberg	Audi Quattro A2
10	Rally Argentina	1984	Björn Cederberg	Audi Quattro A2
11	(Ivory Coast) Rallye Côte d'Ivoire	1984	Björn Cederberg	Audi Sport Quattro

== Racing record ==
=== Complete IMC results ===
Year	Entrant	Car	1	2	3	4	5	6	7	8	9
1970	Saab Scania	Saab 96 V4	MON	SWE; 2	ITA	KEN	AUT	GRE	GBR; Ret		
1971	Saab Scania	Saab 96 V4	MON	SWE; 1	ITA	KEN; 13	MAR	AUT	GRE	FRA	GBR; 1
1972	Saab Scania	Saab 96 V4	MON	SWE; 1	KEN	MAR	GRE; Ret	AUT; Ret	ITA	USA	GBR; 2

=== Complete WRC results ===
Year	Entrant	Car	1	2	3	4	5	6	7	8	9	10	11	12	13	14	15	16	WDC	Pts
1973	Saab	Saab 96 V4	MON	SWE; 1	POR	KEN	MOR	GRE	POL	FIN; Ret	AUT; Ret	ITA	USA	GBR; Ret	FRA				N/A	N/A
1974	Saab Scania	Saab 96 V4	POR	KEN	FIN; 4	ITA	CAN	USA	GBR; 2	FRA									N/A	N/A
1975	Saab Scania	Saab 96 V4	MON	SWE; 2	KEN	GRE	MOR	POR	FIN; EX	ITA	FRA	GBR; Ret							N/A	N/A
1976	Saab Scania	Saab 96 V4	MON	SWE; 2	POR	KEN	GRE	MOR											N/A	N/A
1976	Saab Scania	Saab 99 EMS							FIN; Ret	ITA	FRA	GBR; 2							N/A	N/A
1977	Saab Scania	Saab 99 EMS	MON	SWE; 1	POR	KEN	NZL	GRE	FIN; Ret	CAN	ITA	FRA	GBR; Ret						N/A	N/A
1978	Lancia Pirelli	Lancia Stratos HF	MON	SWE; 4	KEN	POR	GRE	FIN											N/A	N/A
1978	Saab Scania	Saab 99 EMS							CAN; Ret	ITA	CIV	FRA							N/A	N/A
1978	Saab Scania	Saab 99 Turbo											GBR; Ret						N/A	N/A
1979	Saab Scania	Saab 99 Turbo	MON	SWE; 1	POR	KEN	GRE	NZL	FIN	CAN	ITA	FRA	GBR; Ret	CIV					10th	20
1980	Saab Scania	Saab 99 Turbo	MON	SWE; 2	POR	KEN	GRC	ARG	FIN	NZL	ITA	FRA	GBR; Ret	CIV					17th	15
1981	Saab Sport & Rally	Saab 99 Turbo	MON	SWE; 5	POR	KEN	FRA	GRC	ARG	BRA									13th	23
1981	Team Talbot Sweden	Talbot Sunbeam Lotus									FIN; 8	ITA	CIV						13th	23
1981	Talbot Sport	Talbot Sunbeam Lotus												GBR; 3					13th	23
1982	Audi Sport Sweden	Audi Quattro	MON	SWE; 1	POR	KEN	FRA	GRC	NZL	BRA	FIN; 2	ITA; 1	CIV						4th	58
1982	Peugeot Talbot Sport	Talbot Sunbeam Lotus												GBR; 8					4th	58
1983	Audi Sport	Audi Quattro A1	MON; 3		POR; Ret	KEN	FRA												4th	89
1983	Audi Sport	Audi 80 Quattro		SWE; 2															4th	89
1983	Audi Sport	Audi Quattro A2						GRC; 3	NZL; EX	ARG; 2	FIN; 2	ITA; Ret	CIV	GBR; 1					4th	89
1984	HB Audi Team	Audi Quattro A2	MON; 2	SWE; 1	POR; Ret	KEN; Ret	FRA; 5	GRE; 1	NZL; 1	ARG; 1	FIN; 4								1st	125
1984	HB Audi Team	Audi Quattro Sport										ITA; Ret	CIV; 1	GBR					1st	125
1985	HB Audi Team	Audi Quattro Sport	MON; 4	SWE; 2	POR; 4	KEN; Ret	FRA	GRC; 2	NZL; 4										2nd	75
1985	HB Audi Team	Audi Quattro Sport E2								ARG; Ret	FIN; 2	ITA	CIV	GBR					2nd	75
1986	Ford Motor Co Ltd.	Ford RS200	MON	SWE; Ret	POR; Ret	KEN	FRA	GRE; Ret	NZL					GBR; Ret	USA				11th	22
1986	Shell Peugeot Talbot Sport	Peugeot 205 T16 E2								ARG; 3	FIN; 4	CIV	ITA						11th	22
1987	Ford Motor Co Ltd.	Ford Sierra XR 4x4	MON; EX	SWE; 6	POR					NZL; Ret	ARG								7th	33
1987	Ford Motor Co Ltd.	Ford Sierra RS Cosworth				KEN; Ret	FRA; Ret	GRE	USA			FIN; 3	CIV	ITA	GBR; 2				7th	33
1988	Rally Sport Sweden	Ford Sierra XR 4x4	MON	SWE; 2															4th	41
1988	Stig Blomqvist	Ford Sierra RS Cosworth			POR; 5	KEN	FRA	GRC	USA	NZL	ARG								4th	41
1988	Ford Motor Co Ltd.	Ford Sierra RS Cosworth										FIN; 5	CIV	ITA; 7	GBR; 6				4th	41
1989	Team VAG Sweden	Audi 200 Sport Quattro	SWE; 5	MON	POR														16th	20
1989	Volkswagen Motorsport	Volkswagen Golf GTi 16V				KEN; 3	FRA	GRC	NZL	ARG	FIN	AUS	ITA	CIV	GBR				16th	20
1991	Nissan Motorsports Europe	Nissan Sunny GTI-R	MON	SWE	POR	KEN; 5	FRA	GRE; Ret	NZL	ARG	FIN; 8	AUS	ITA	CIV	ESP	GBR; Ret			24th	11
1992	Nissan Motorsports Europe	Nissan Sunny GTI-R	MON	SWE; 3	POR	KEN	FRA	GRC	NZL	ARG	FIN; Ret	AUS	ITA	CIV	ESP	GBR; Ret			21st	12
1993	Opel Team Sweden	Opel Calibra Turbo 4x4	MON	SWE; Ret	POR	KEN	FRA	GRC	ARG	NZL	FIN	AUS	ITA	ESP					NC	0
1994	Ford Motor Co Ltd.	Ford Escort RS Cosworth	MON	POR	KEN	FRA	GRC	ARG	NZL	FIN	ITA	GBR; 4							17th	10
1995	R.A.S. Ford	Ford Escort RS Cosworth	MON	SWE; 7	POR	FRA	NZL	AUS	ESP										15st	4
1995	Trigard Team Škoda	Škoda Felicia Kit Car								GBR; 21									15st	4
1996	Ford Motor Co Ltd.	Ford Escort RS Cosworth	SWE; 8	KEN; 7	IDN	GRC	ARG	FIN											18th	7
1996	Trigard Team Škoda	Škoda Felicia Kit Car							AUS; Ret	ITA	ESP								18th	7
1997	Ford Motor Co	Ford Escort WRC	MON	SWE; 10	KEN	POR	ESP	FRA	ARG	GRC	NZL	FIN	IDN	ITA	AUS	GBR			NC	0
1999	Ford Motor Co Ltd.	Ford Puma Kit Car	MON	SWE; Ret	KEN	POR	ESP	FRA	ARG	GRC	NZL	FIN	CHN	ITA	AUS	GBR			NC	0
2000	Stig Blomqvist	Mitsubishi Lancer Evo VI	MON	SWE	KEN	POR	ESP	ARG	GRC	NZL	FIN	CYP	FRA	ITA	AUS	GBR; Ret			NC	0
2001	David Sutton Cars Ltd	Mitsubishi Lancer Evo VI	MON	SWE; 18	POR; Ret	ESP; 21	ARG; Ret	CYP; Ret	GRC; Ret	KEN; Ret		NZL; 21	ITA; 30	FRA	AUS; 23	GBR; 16			NC	0
2001	Škoda Motorsport	Škoda Octavia WRC Evo2									FIN; 22								NC	0
2002	Shell Škoda Motorsport	Škoda Octavia WRC Evo2	MON	SWE; 15	FRA	ESP; Ret	CYP	ARG	GRC; 17	KEN	FIN	GER	ITA						NC	0
2002	Stig Blomqvist	Mitsubishi Lancer Evo VII												NZL; 19	AUS; 22	GBR; Ret			NC	0
2003	David Sutton Cars Ltd	Subaru Impreza STi N8	MON	SWE; 26	TUR														NC	0
2003	David Sutton Cars Ltd	Subaru Impreza WRX STi				NZL; 24	ARG	GRC	CYP; 11	GER; 29	FIN	AUS; 19	ITA	FRA; 20	ESP	GBR			NC	0
2004	David Sutton Cars Ltd	Subaru Impreza WRX STi	MON	SWE; 21	MEX	NZL	CYP	GRC; 14	TUR	ARG	FIN	GER	JPN	GBR	ITA	FRA	ESP	AUS	NC	0
2005	Stig Blomqvist	Subaru Impreza WRX STi	MON	SWE; 20	MEX	NZL	ITA	CYP	TUR	GRC	ARG	FIN	GER	GBR	JPN	FRA	ESP	AUS	NC	0
2006	Stig Blomqvist	Subaru Impreza WRX STi	MON	SWE; 24	MEX	ESP	FRA	ARG	ITA	GRE	GER	FIN	JPN	CYP	TUR	AUS	NZL	GBR	NC	0

=== Complete FIA European Rallycross Cup results ===
==== Overall ====
Year	Entrant	Car	1	2	3	4	5	6	7	8	9	10	ERC	Points
1976	Saab	Saab 96 V4 Turbo	AUT1	GER1	FIN	SWE; 10	BEL	AUT2	NED	GBR1	GER2	GBR2	37th	1
1978	Saab	Saab 99 Turbo	AUT	ITA	SWE; 4	FIN	BEL	NED	FRA	GBR	GER		36th	10

=== Complete FIA European Rallycross Championship results ===
==== Touringcar Division ====
Year	Entrant	Car	1	2	3	4	5	6	7	8	9	10	ERX	Points
1979	Saab	Saab 99 Turbo	AUT	ITA	FIN	SWE	FRA	BEL	NED; 6	GBR	GER		18th	6
1981	Saab	Saab 99 Turbo	AUT	SWE; 9	FIN	DEN	BEL	NED	FRA	NOR	GBR	GER	32nd	2

==== Division 2 ====
Year	Entrant	Car	1	2	3	4	5	6	7	8	9	10	11	ERX	Points
1989	Stig Blomqvist	Ford RS200 E2	SPA	AUT	SWE; 7	FIN; 3	IRE	FRA	BEL; 3	NED; 3	NOR	GBR	GER	11th	55
1994	Stig Blomqvist	Ford Escort RS Cosworth	AUT	POR	FRA	IRE	GBR	SWE	FIN	BEL	NED	NOR; 5	GER	21st	12

=== Complete World Touring Car Championship results ===
(key) (Races in bold indicate pole position) (Races in italics indicate fastest lap)

Year	Team	Car	1	2	3	4	5	6	7	8	9	10	11	DC	Pts
1987	(Sweden) Söderqvist Racing Sport	Volvo 240T	MNZ	JAR	DIJ	NÜR	SPA	BNO	SIL	BAT	CLD	WEL ovr:13 cls:8†	FJI	NC	0

† Not eligible for points.

=== Complete British Touring Car Championship results ===
(key) (Races in bold indicate pole position in class) (Races in italics indicate fastest lap in class)

Year	Team	Car	Class	1	2	3	4	5	6	7	8	9	10	11	12	13	Overall Pos	Pts	Class Pos
1990	Trakstar Motorsport	Ford Sierra RS500	A	OUL	DON ovr:2‡ cls:2‡	THR	SIL	OUL	SIL	BRH	SNE	BRH	BIR	DON	THR	SIL	NC‡	0	NC‡

‡ Endurance driver – not eligible for points

Awards and achievements
Preceded by Michèle Mouton	Autosport; International Rally Driver Award; 1983	Succeeded by Ari Vatanen
Sporting positions
Preceded by Hannu Mikkola	World Rally Champion; 1984	Succeeded by Timo Salonen
Preceded by Juha Kankkunen	Race of Champions; Champion of Champions; 1989–1990	Succeeded by Juha Kankkunen
Preceded by Flavio Alonso	Race of Champions; Rally Master; 1993	Succeeded by Timo Salonen
Records
Preceded by Jean-Claude Andruet; 30 years, 169 days (1973 Monte Carlo Rally)	Youngest rally winner 26 years, 203 days (1973 Swedish Rally)	Succeeded by Markku Alén; 24 years, 156 days (1975 Rallye de Portugal)
