= Ari Vatanen =

Finnish rally driver and politician (born 1952)

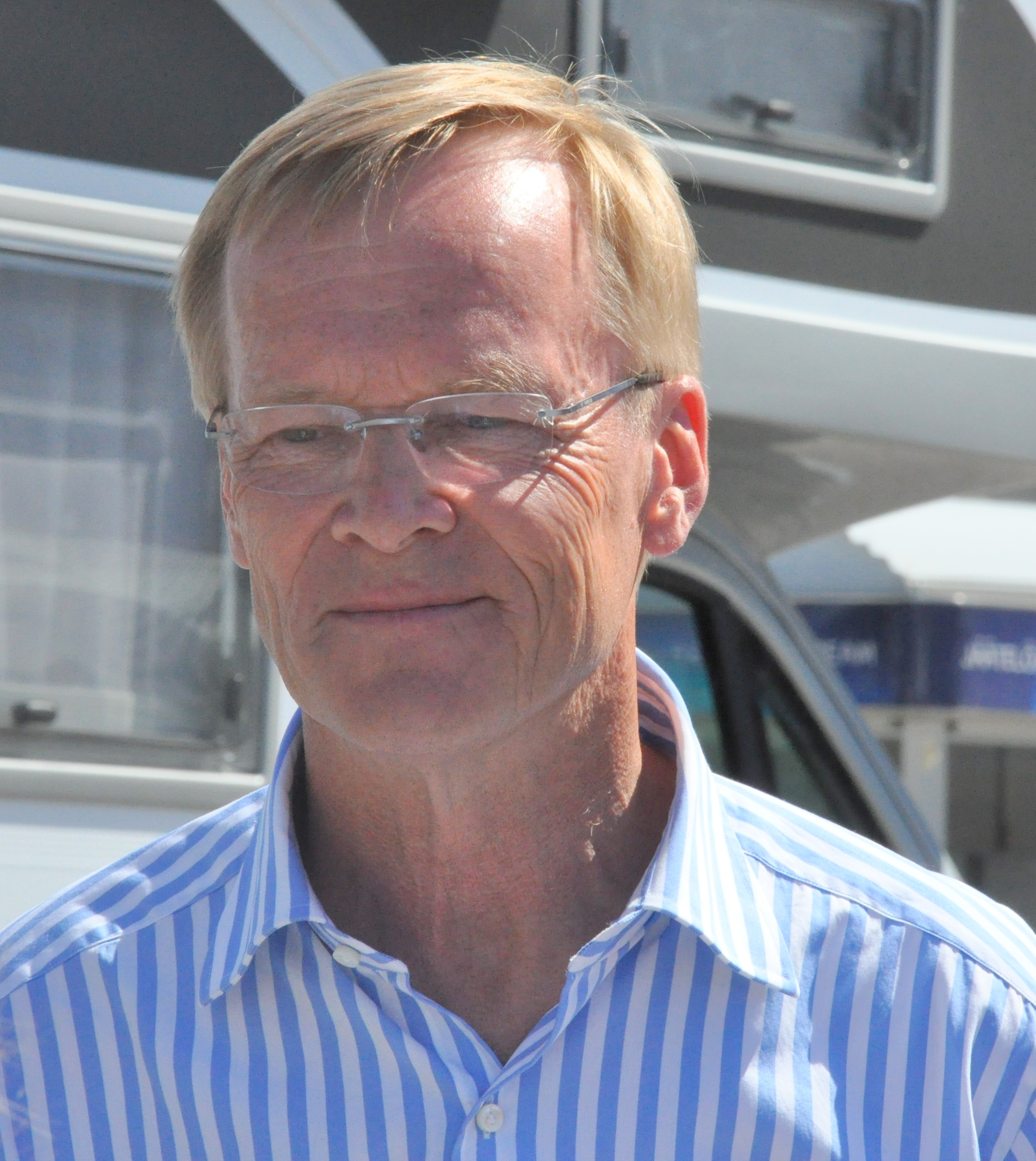
- Vatanen in 2009
- Born: Ari Pieti Uolevi Vatanen; 27 April 1952 (age 74); Tuupovaara, Finland

World Rally Championship record
- Years active: 1974–1985, 1987–1998, 2003
- Co-driver: (Finland) Alf Krogell (United Kingdom) Geraint Phillips (United Kingdom) Peter Bryant (Finland) Atso Aho (New Zealand) Jim Scott (United Kingdom) David Richards (United Kingdom) Terry Harryman (Monaco) "Tilber" (Sweden) Bruno Berglund (Italy) Fabrizia Pons (United Kingdom) Roger Freeman (United Kingdom) Fred Gallagher (Finland) Juha Repo
- Teams: Ford, Opel, Peugeot, Subaru, BMW, Mitsubishi, Citroën
- Rallies: 101
- Championships: 1 (1981)
- Rally wins: 10
- Podiums: 27
- Stage wins: 590
- Total points: 518
- First rally: 1974 1000 Lakes Rally
- First win: 1980 Acropolis Rally
- Last win: 1985 Swedish Rally
- Last rally: 2003 Rally Finland

Member of the European Parliament for Finland
- In office 13 June 1999 – 12 June 2004

Member of the European Parliament for Sud-Est (France)
- In office 13 June 2004 – 6 June 2009

Personal details
- Party: National Coalition Party; Union for a Popular Movement

Ari Pieti Uolevi Vatanen (pronounced [ˈɑri ˈʋɑtɑnen]; born 27 April 1952) is a Finnish former rally driver and politician and a Member of the European Parliament (MEP) from 1999 to 2009. He won the World Rally Championship drivers' title in 1981 and the Paris Dakar Rally four times. In addition, he won the 1997 FIA World Cup for Cross-Country Rallies.

== Racing career ==
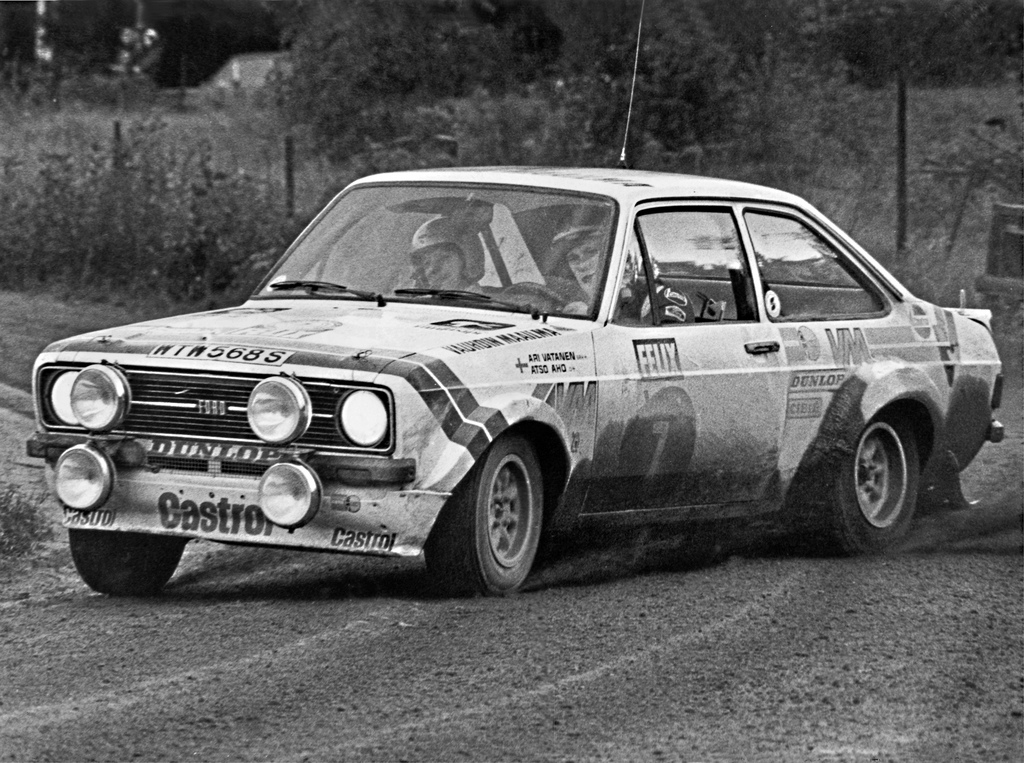
Vatanen drives a Ford Escort RS1800 at the 1978 1000 Lakes Rally

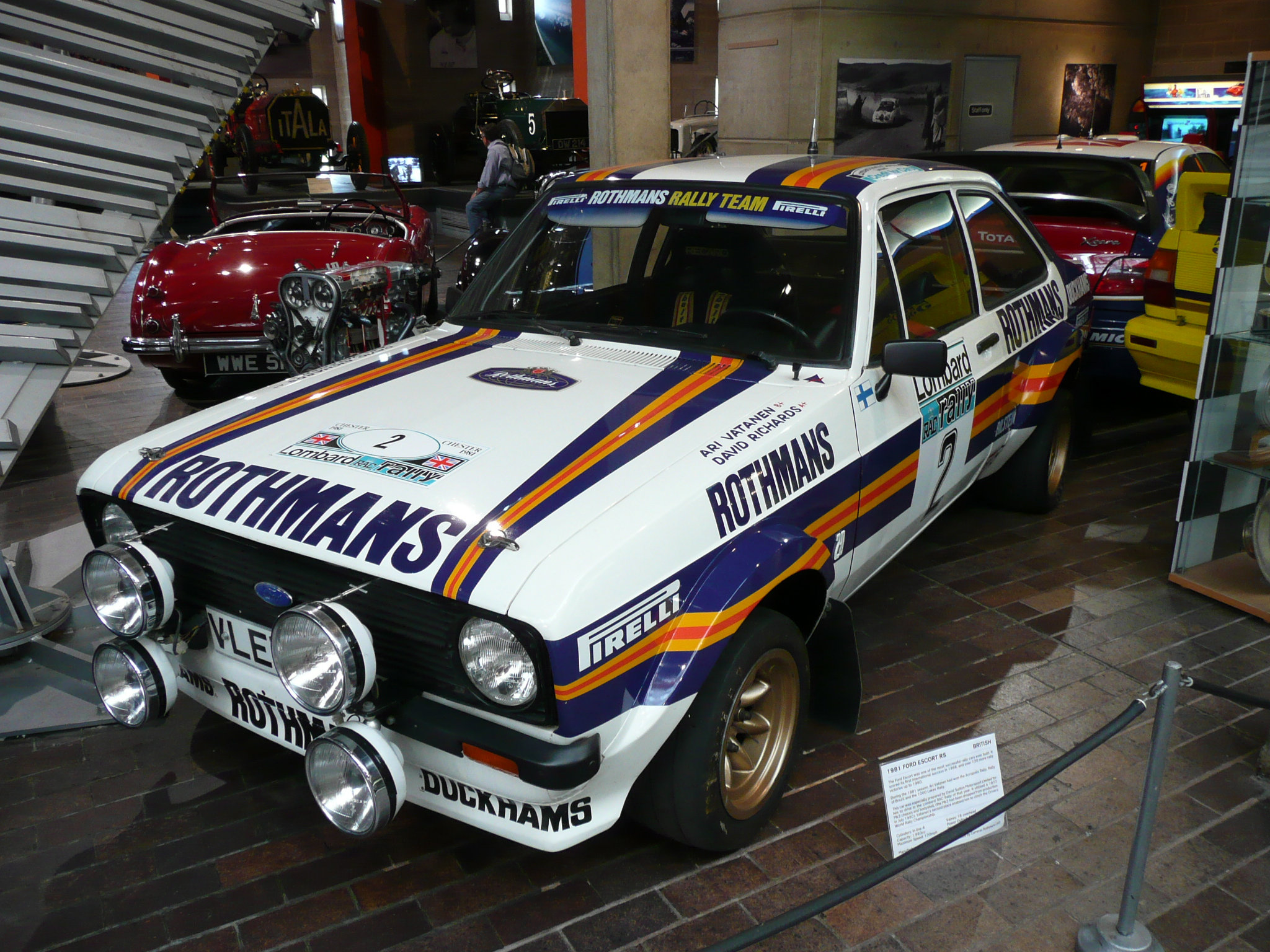
The Ford Escort RS1800 in which Vatanen finished 2nd on the 1981 RAC Rally

Vatanen's debut year in rallying was 1970, and he debuted in the World Rally Championship at the 1974 1000 Lakes Rally. In that year he won the Nortti Rally in an Opel Ascona, beating Hannu Mikkola in the process, which brought him to wider attention. His first international rally was the 1975 Rothmans 747 Rally in Jamaica driving a Datsun 120Y. He placed 12th with co-driver Gerry Phillips. At the end of that season he was offered his first professional drive, in a Ford Escort RS1800, on the RAC Rally. He crashed out on the second day, but by then he had impressed Ford team manager Stuart Turner enough to be offered a seat in the team for the British Rally Championship the following year.

In the 1976 Scottish Rally (part of the British Rally Championship), the Ford works team replaced a broken differential in Ari Vatanen's Mk2 Escort RS 1800 with one they removed from a spectator's Ford Capri. The change was caught on film in a documentary of the event, a copy of which is here https://www.youtube.com/watch?v=02RaQAvzMps, from 21 minutes to 25 minutes in.. Vatanen did not finish the Scottish Rally, but he won the championship, a feat he repeated in 1980, co-driven by David Richards, who later became chairman of Prodrive. Between 1977 and 1980, Vatanen also competed in selected World Championship events, initially for the official Ford team and then, after its withdrawal from the sport at the end of 1979, for the semi-private Rothmans Rally Team. He took his debut win at the 1980 Acropolis Rally and became the World Rally Champion in 1981.

Vatanen and Richards parted ways for the 1982 season, and for the next few years Vatanen was co-driven by Terry Harryman. He did not defend his world title in 1982, competing instead in the British Championship in a Ford Escort, before moving to the Opel team for 1983. The Opel Ascona and Opel Manta were only two-wheel-drive and not fully competitive, but Vatanen still won the Safari Rally.

In 1984, Vatanen signed to drive the Peugeot 205 T16 for Peugeot's factory team. From the 1984 1000 Lakes Rally to 1985 Swedish Rally, Vatanen won five world rallies in a row. He was tipped to win the 1985 world title, but at mid-season was trailing his teammate Timo Salonen after a series of accidents and mechanical problems. He then had a serious accident on the Rally Argentina, when his car somersaulted at over 120 mph (190 km/h). His seat broke, and he was thrown around inside the car, suffering severe injuries to his legs and torso and life-threatening internal bleeding. He spent 18 months recovering first from his physical injuries, and then from severe depression. He went on to make a complete recovery and his return to motorsport in 1987 saw him go on to win the Paris-Dakar Rally four times; with Peugeot in 1987, 1989 and 1990, and with Citroën in 1991. He became the centre of controversy when his car was stolen whilst leading the same rally in 1988.

In 1997, Vatanen won the FIA World Cup for Cross-Country Rallies with a Citroën ZX Rallye-raid alongside navigator Fred Gallagher (co-driver).

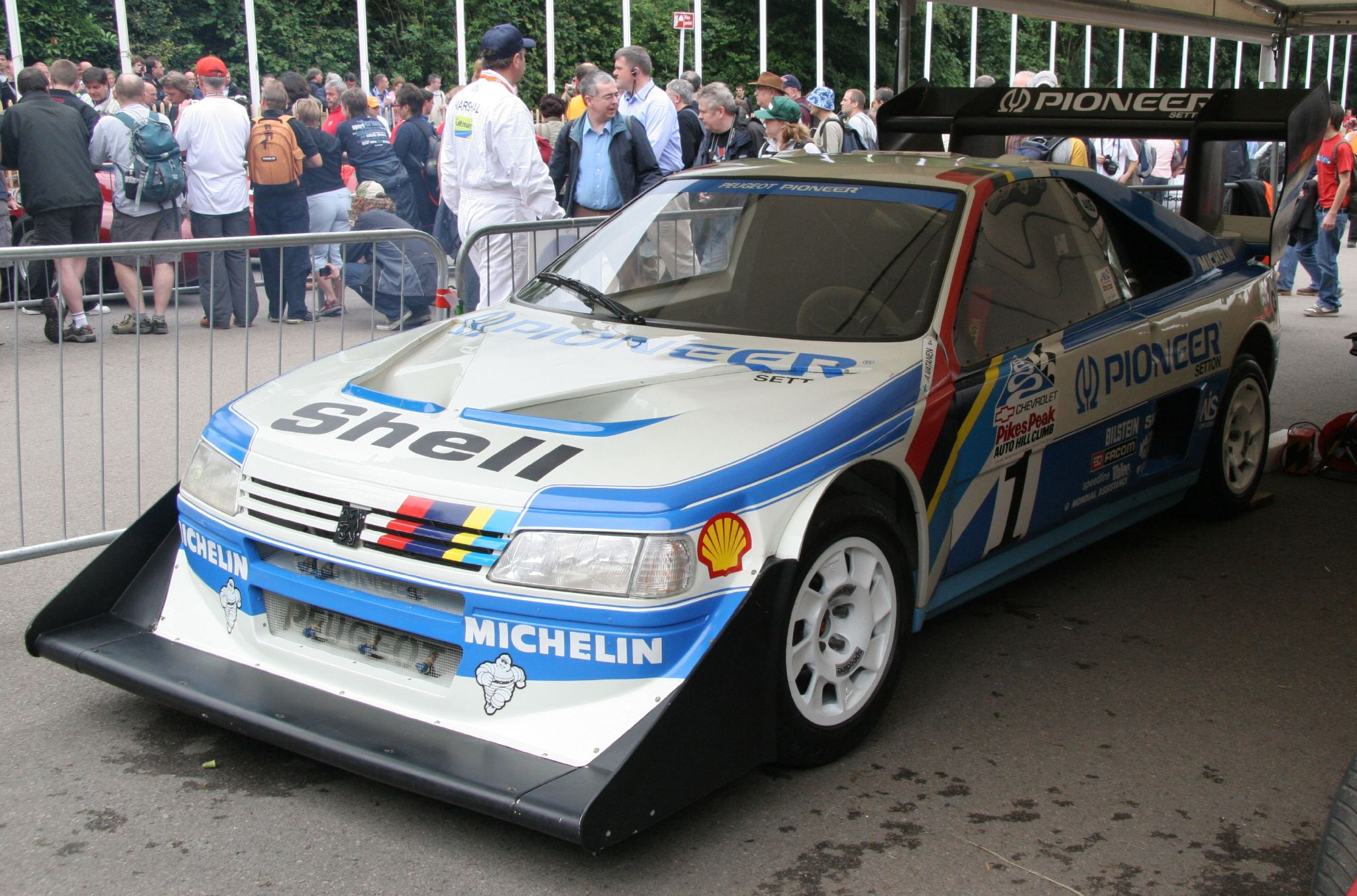
Vatanen's Peugeot 405 T16 GR on display

With Peugeot, Vatanen also won the Pikes Peak International Hillclimb, after Peugeot stopped participating in the World Rally Championship in 1986, due to the demise of Group B rallying. Peugeot used the lessons learnt from its 205 T16 to create the 405 T16. With at least 600 bhp (447 kW), large aerofoils, four-wheel drive and four-wheel steering, Vatanen took the car up the hill in record time, his efforts being captured in the award-winning short film Climb Dance.

Vatanen continued competing in the World Rally Championship until the 1998 season. He drove for Mitsubishi Ralliart Europe in four events in 1989 and in five events in 1990. His best result with the Mitsubishi Galant VR-4 was second at the 1990 1000 Lakes Rally. From 1992 to 1993, he competed for Subaru in 11 events, finishing second three times, including on the debut event of the first Subaru Impreza in Finland. Vatanen briefly led the event before being overhauled by eventual winner Juha Kankkunen. Even so, he was dropped by the Subaru team at the end of the 1993 season in favour of Carlos Sainz.

The following year, Vatanen returned to the wheel of a Ford, driving the Ford Escort RS Cosworth for a semi-private team, and then being co-opted into the Ford factory team where he stood in for the injured Francois Delecour. He scored a podium finish on Rally Argentina, the first time he had contested the event since his accident there nine years previously.

From 1995, Vatanen competed less frequently. He scored a podium finish at the 1998 Safari Rally, and then briefly returned to a works Subaru for the season-ending Rally of Great Britain, marking his 100th World Rally Championship event.

Vatanen joined Nissan in the Paris-Dakar in 2003, finishing seventh. He also made an appearance at the 2003 Rally Finland with a Bozian Racing-prepared Peugeot 206 WRC, finishing eleventh. In 2004 and 2005, he drove the Dakar for Nissan, and in 2007 he made another attempt with Volkswagen, but retired on the seventh stage after a fire destroyed his car.

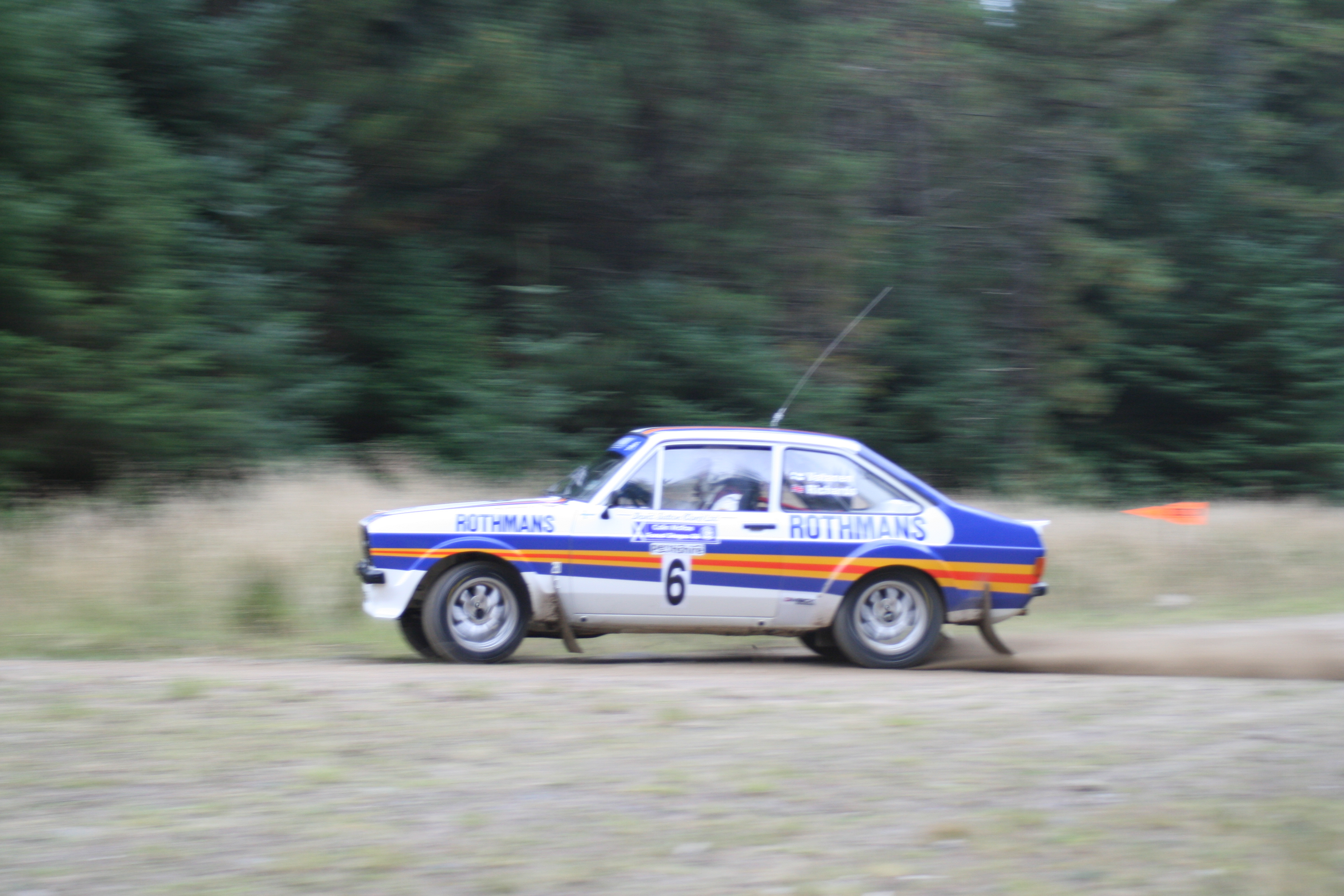
Vatanen and Richards at the 2008 Colin McRae Forest Stages

In September 2008, Vatanen took part in the Colin McRae Forest Stages Rally, a round of the Scottish Rally Championship centred in Perth in Scotland. His co-driver was once again David Richards and they competed in the same Rothmans sponsored Ford Escort RS1800 that they drove in 1981. He was one of a number of ex-world champions to take part in the event in memory of McRae, who died in 2007.

== Personal life ==
Vatanen was born and grew up in rural Tuupovaara in Eastern Finland. He is married to Rita and has four children, Kim (1972–2024), Ria (b. 1980), Tua (b. 1982) and Max (b. 1990). They have homes in Finland and France. Kim was the manager of current WRC driver Sébastien Ogier. In 2016 Max followed his fathers footsteps by entering the British Rally Championship driving an M-Sport prepared Ford Fiesta R5.

In 1993, Vatanen settled in southern France, where he bought a farm and a winery.

Vatanen speaks fluent Finnish, English, and French.

== Political career ==
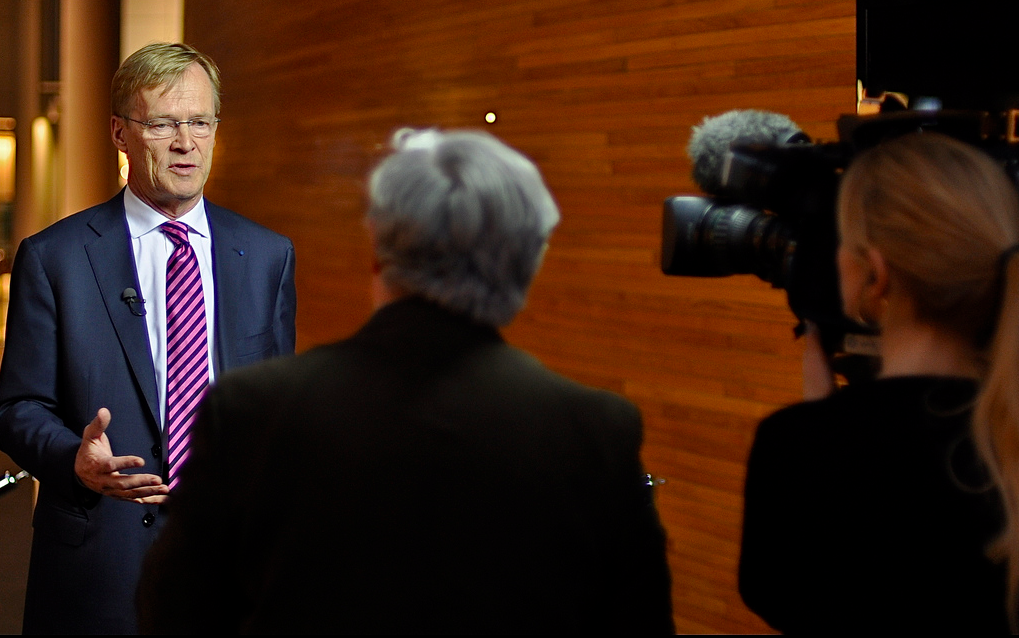
European Parliament, Strasbourg

In 1999, Vatanen was elected to the European Parliament from the list of the conservative Finnish National Coalition party although he continued to live in France. The issues on which he worked included car taxation, traffic policies, development aid and agricultural policy.

In 2004, he was re-elected, this time from the list of the conservative French Union for a Popular Movement. In the 2009 European Parliament elections Vatanen was again a National Coalition candidate in Finland, but he did not get elected this time.

In July 2009, Vatanen declared his interest in being a candidate to stand against Max Mosley in the FIA presidential elections in October if Mosley decide to stand for another term as president. Vatanen later confirmed that he would run for the presidency. On 23 October 2009, Vatanen failed in his bid to be elected as president of the FIA, which was won by his former team boss at Peugeot, subsequently Scuderia Ferrari manager Jean Todt.

Vatanen is a signatory of the Prague Declaration on European Conscience and Communism.

== Career results ==
=== WRC victories ===
Number	Event	Season	Co-driver	Car
1	(Greece) Acropolis Rally	1980	David Richards	Ford Escort RS1800
2	(Greece) Acropolis Rally	1981	David Richards	Ford Escort RS1800
3	(Brazil) Rallye do Brasil	1981	David Richards	Ford Escort RS1800
4	(Finland) 1000 Lakes Rally	1981	David Richards	Ford Escort RS1800
5	(Kenya) Safari Rally	1983	Terry Harryman	Opel Ascona 400
6	(Finland) 1000 Lakes Rally	1984	Terry Harryman	Peugeot 205 Turbo 16
7	(Italy) Rallye Sanremo	1984	Terry Harryman	Peugeot 205 Turbo 16
8	(United Kingdom) RAC Rally	1984	Terry Harryman	Peugeot 205 Turbo 16
9	(Monaco) Rallye Automobile de Monte-Carlo	1985	Terry Harryman	Peugeot 205 Turbo 16
10	(Sweden) Swedish Rally	1985	Terry Harryman	Peugeot 205 Turbo 16

=== Complete WRC results ===
Year	Entrant	Car	1	2	3	4	5	6	7	8	9	10	11	12	13	14	WDC	Points
1974	Ari Vatanen	Opel Ascona 19	POR	KEN	FIN; Ret	ITA	CAN	USA	GBR	FRA							N/A	N/A
1975	Ford Motor Company Ltd	Ford Escort RS1600	MON	SWE	KEN	GRC	MOR	POR	FIN; Ret	ITA	FRA						N/A	N/A
1975	Ford Motor Company Ltd	Ford Escort RS1800										GBR; Ret					N/A	N/A
1976	Ford Motor Company Ltd	Ford Escort RS1800	MON	SWE	POR	KEN	GRC	MOR	FIN; Ret	ITA	FRA	GBR; Ret					N/A	N/A
1977	Ford Motor Company Ltd	Ford Escort RS1800	MON	SWE	POR; Ret	KEN; Ret	NZL; 2	GRC; Ret	FIN; Ret	CAN; Ret	ITA; Ret	FRA	GBR; Ret				NC	0
1978	Ford Motor Company Ltd	Ford Escort RS1800	MON	SWE; 5	KEN	POR; Ret	GRC	FIN; Ret	CAN	ITA	CIV	FRA					8th	11
1978	Marlboro	Ford Escort RS1800											GBR; DSQ				8th	11
1979	Rothmans Ford Rally Team	Ford Fiesta 1600	MON; 10														5th	50
1979	Rothmans Ford Rally Team	Ford Escort RS1800		SWE; Ret	POR; Ret	KEN	GRC		FIN; 2	CAN; 3	ITA	FRA	GBR; 4	CIV			5th	50
1979	Ford Motor Company Ltd	Ford Escort RS1800						NZL; 3									5th	50
1980	Publimmo Racing	Ford Escort RS1800	MON; Ret														4th	50
1980	Rothmans Ford Rally Team	Ford Escort RS1800		SWE	POR; Ret	KEN	GRC; 1	ARG	FIN; 2	NZL	ITA; 2	FRA	GBR; Ret	CIV			4th	50
1981	Rothmans Ford Rally Team	Ford Escort RS1800	MON; Ret	SWE; 2	POR; Ret	KEN	FRA	GRC; 1	ARG; Ret	BRA; 1	FIN; 1	ITA; 7	CIV; 9	GBR; 2			**1st**	**96**
1982	David Sutton Motorsport	Ford Escort RS1800	MON	SWE; 2	POR	KEN	FRA	GRC	NZL	BRA							13th	15
1982	MCD / Mobira	Ford Escort RS1800									FIN; Ret	ITA	CIV				13th	15
1982	Rothmans Opel Rally Team	Opel Ascona 400												GBR; Ret			13th	15
1983	Rothmans Opel Rally Team	Opel Ascona 400	MON; 5	SWE; 6	POR	KEN; 1	FRA										6th	44
1983	Rothmans Opel Rally Team	Opel Manta 400						GRC; 4	NZL	ARG	FIN; Ret	ITA; Ret	CIV	GBR; Ret			6th	44
1984	Shell Peugeot Talbot Sport	Peugeot 205 Turbo 16	MON	SWE	POR	KEN	FRA; Ret	GRC; Ret	NZL	ARG	FIN; 1	ITA; 1	CIV	GBR; 1			4th	60
1985	Shell Peugeot Talbot Sport	Peugeot 205 Turbo 16	MON; 1	SWE; 1	POR; Ret	KEN; Ret	FRA; Ret										4th	55
1985	Shell Peugeot Talbot Sport	Peugeot 205 Turbo 16 E2						GRC; Ret	NZL; 2	ARG; Ret	FIN	ITA	CIV	GBR			4th	55
1987	Fuji Heavy Industries	Subaru RX Turbo	MON	SWE	POR	KEN; 10	FRA	GRC	USA	NZL	ARG						19th	16
1987	Ford Motor Company Ltd	Ford Sierra RS Cosworth										FIN; 2	CIV	ITA	GBR		19th	16
1988	Prodrive BMW	BMW M3	MON	SWE	POR	KEN	FRA	GRC	USA	NZL	ARG	FIN; Ret	CIV	ITA			–	0
1988	Ralliart Europe	Mitsubishi Galant VR-4													GBR; Ret		–	0
1989	Mitsubishi Ralliart Europe	Mitsubishi Galant VR-4	SWE	MON; 87	POR	KEN	FRA	GRC; Ret	NZL	ARG	FIN; Ret	AUS	ITA	CIV	GBR; 5		40th	8
1990	Mitsubishi Ralliart Europe	Mitsubishi Galant VR-4	MON; Ret	POR; Ret	KEN	FRA	GRC; Ret	NZL	ARG	FIN; 2	AUS	ITA	CIV	GBR; Ret			16th	15
1991	Milk Team	Ford Sierra Cosworth RS 4x4	MON	SWE	POR	KEN	FRA	GRE	NZL	ARG	FIN; 7	AUS	ITA	CIV	ESP		22nd	12
1991	Subaru Rally Team Europe	Subaru Legacy RS														GBR; 5	22nd	12
1992	Subaru Rally Team Europe	Subaru Legacy RS	MON	SWE; Ret	POR	KEN	FRA	GRC; Ret	NZL; Ret	ARG	FIN; 4	AUS; Ret	ITA	CIV	ESP	GBR; 2	11th	25
1993	555 Subaru World Rally Team	Subaru Legacy RS	MON	SWE	POR	KEN	FRA	GRC; Ret	ARG	NZL; Ret		AUS; 2	ITA	ESP			7th	38
1993	555 Subaru World Rally Team	Subaru Impreza 555									FIN; 2				GBR; 5		7th	38
1994	SMS	Ford Escort RS Cosworth	MON	POR	KEN	FRA	GRC; 5			FIN; Ret	ITA	GBR; 5					9th	28
1994	Ford Motor Company Ltd	Ford Escort RS Cosworth						ARG; 3	NZL; Ret								9th	28
1996	Ford Motor Company Ltd	Ford Escort RS Cosworth	SWE; Ret	KEN	IDN	GRC	ARG	FIN	AUS	ITA	ESP						–	0
1997	Motorsport Consultancy	Ford Escort WRC	MON	SWE	KEN	POR	ESP	FRA	ARG	GRC	NZL	FIN	IDN	ITA	AUS	GBR; 8	–	0
1998	Ford Motor Company Ltd	Ford Escort WRC	MON	SWE	KEN; 3	POR; 5	ESP	FRA	ARG	GRC	NZL	FIN; Ret	ITA	AUS			11th	6
1998	555 Subaru World Rally Team	Subaru Impreza WRC 98														GBR; Ret	11th	6
2003	Bozian Racing	Peugeot 206 WRC	MON	SWE	TUR	NZL	ARG	GRC	CYP	GER	FIN; 11	AUS	ITA	FRA	ESP	GBR	–	0

=== Complete Dakar Rally results ===
Year	Class	Vehicle	Result	Stages
1987	Car	(France) Peugeot	**1st**	3
1988	Car	(France) Peugeot	DSQ	4
1989	Car	(France) Peugeot	**1st**	7
1990	Car	(France) Peugeot	**1st**	7
1991	Car	(France) Citroën	**1st**	5
1992	Car	(France) Citroën	5th	7
1993	Car	(France) Citroën	8th	2
1994	did not enter			
1995	Car	(France) Citroën	DNF	3
1996	Car	(France) Citroën	4th	7
1997–2002	did not enter			
2003	Car	(Japan) Nissan	7th	4
2004	Car	(Japan) Nissan	DNF	1
2005	Car	(Japan) Nissan	39th	0
2006	did not enter			
2007	Car	(Germany) Volkswagen	DNF	0

=== Complete European Touring Car Championship results ===
(key) (Races in bold indicate pole position) (Races in italics indicate fastest lap)

Year	Team	Car	1	2	3	4	5	6	7	8	9	10	11	DC	Points
1977	(West Germany) **KWS Freizeit Team**	Ford Escort RS2000	MNZ	SAL	MUG	PER	BRN	NUR; Ret	ZAN	SIL	ZOL	JAR	EST	NC	0
1982	(West Germany) **Eichberg Racing**	Ford Capri III 3.0S	MNZ	VAL	DON	PER	MUG	BRN	SAL	NUR; 12	SPA	SIL	ZOL	NC	0

Awards and achievements
Preceded by Stig Blomqvist	Autosport; International Rally Driver Award; 1984	Succeeded by Timo Salonen
Sporting positions
Preceded by Walter Röhrl	World Rally Champion; 1981	Succeeded by Walter Röhrl
Preceded by René Metge	Dakar Rally; Cars Winner; 1987	Succeeded by Juha Kankkunen
Preceded by Juha Kankkunen	Dakar Rally; Cars Winner; 1989, 1990, 1991	Succeeded by Hubert Auriol
Records
Preceded by Walter Röhrl; 33 years, 232 days (1980 season)	Youngest World Rally Champion; 29 years, 212 days (1981 season)	Succeeded by Juha Kankkunen; 27 years, 249 days (1986 season)
