= 1997 Race of Champions =

Seasons
- ← 1996 1998 →

The 1997 Race of Champions took place on December 7 at Gran Canaria. It was the 10th running of the event, and the 6th running at Gran Canaria. Carlos Sainz defeated sometime Subaru WRC teammate Colin McRae to become Champion of Champions.

== Participants ==
Driver	Reason for Qualification
(United Kingdom) Colin McRae	World Rally champion in 1995
(France) Didier Auriol	World Rally champion in 1994
(Spain) Carlos Sainz	World Rally champion in 1990 and 1992
(Finland) Jarmo Kytölehto	Winner in the International Masters
(Germany) Armin Schwarz	Finalist in the International Masters
(Uruguay) Gustavo Trelles	3rd in the International Masters
(Germany) Walter Röhrl	Winner in the Legends Race
(Sweden) Stig Blomqvist	Finalist in the Legends Race

== Race of Champions ==
Quarter-finals
(United Kingdom) Colin McRae	1
(Uruguay) Gustavo Trelles	0
(Finland) Jarmo Kytölehto	1
(Germany) Walter Röhrl	0
(Germany) Armin Schwarz	0
(France) Didier Auriol	1
(Spain) Carlos Sainz	1
(Sweden) Stig Blomqvist	0

Semi-finals
(United Kingdom) Colin McRae	2
(Finland) Jarmo Kytölehto	0
(France) Didier Auriol	1
(Spain) Carlos Sainz	2

Final
(United Kingdom) Colin McRae	0
(Spain) Carlos Sainz	2
