= 2000 Race of Champions =

Seasons
- ← 1999 2001 →

The 2000 Race of Champions took place on December 10 at Gran Canaria. It was the 13th running of the event, and the ninth running at Gran Canaria. The International Masters contest was held for the final time this year before a format shake-up for 2001, which opened up the main competition to non-rally drivers.

The vehicles used were the Peugeot 206 WRC, The Mitsubishi Lancer Evolution VI WRC, the Toyota Corolla WRC, the Saab 93 rallycross car and the ROC Buggy.

The individual competition was won by Tommi Makinen, whilst the Nations' Cup was won by France with Yvan Muller, Gilles Panizzi and Régis Laconi.

== Participants ==
=== Race of Champions ===
Driver	Reason for Qualification
(Finland) Marcus Grönholm	World Rally champion in 2000
(Finland) Tommi Mäkinen	World Rally champion in 1996, 1997, 1998 and 1999
(France) Didier Auriol	World Rally champion in 1994
(France) Gilles Panizzi	Seeded
(Germany) Armin Schwarz	Winner in the International Masters
(Spain) Flavio Alonso	Replaces Tom Kristensen after beating Niall McShea in a play-off
(Sweden) Stig Blomqvist	Winner in the Legends Race
(Italy) Valentino Rossi	Invitation

=== Nations Cup ===
Country	Racing Driver	Rally Driver	Motorcycle Racer
France	Yvan Muller	Gilles Panizzi	Régis Laconi
United States	Danny Sullivan	Rod Millen	Colin Edwards
Finland	Harri Toivonen	Tommi Mäkinen	Vesa Kytönen
Spain	Marc Gené	Jesús Puras	Sete Gibernau
Italy	Emanuele Pirro	Miki Biasion	Valentino Rossi
Germany	Frank Biela	Armin Schwarz	Jürgen Fuchs
Japan	Hiroki Katoh	Kenjiro Shinozuka	Nobuatsu Aoki
All-Stars	(Denmark) Tom Kristensen	(Sweden) Stig Blomqvist	(United Kingdom) Jeremy McWilliams

- Marcus Grönholm was to represent the All-Star team, but for an unknown reason his place was taken by Blomqvist.

== Legends Race ==
- Per Eklund & Miki Biasion eliminated in the first round.

Semi-finals
(Sweden) Björn Waldegård	2
(Finland) Hannu Mikkola	1
(Sweden) Stig Blomqvist	2
(Finland) Timo Salonen	1

Final
(Sweden) Björn Waldegård	0
(Sweden) Stig Blomqvist	2

== International Masters ==
- Flavio Alonso secured his place with the quickest time in the Spanish Masters event.
- Armin Schwarz and Tom Kristensen were handed automatic byes to the semi-finals.

Group A

Driver	Wins
(United Kingdom) Niall McShea	2
(Portugal) Pedro Chaves	2
(France) Sébastien Loeb	2
(Portugal) Adruzilo Lopes	0

- McShea advanced with the fastest best time.

Group B

Driver	Wins
(Spain) Flavio Alonso	3
(Australia) Cody Crocker	2
(Poland) Janusz Kulig	1
(Spain) Jesús Puras	0

Semi-finals
(Germany) Armin Schwarz	2
(United Kingdom) Niall McShea	0
(Denmark) Tom Kristensen	2
(Spain) Flavio Alonso	0

Final
(Germany) Armin Schwarz	2
(Denmark) Tom Kristensen	0

== Race of Champions ==
Quarter-finals
(Finland) Marcus Grönholm	2
(Sweden) Stig Blomqvist	0
(France) Didier Auriol	2
(Germany) Armin Schwarz	1
(France) Gilles Panizzi	2
(Italy) Valentino Rossi	0
(Finland) Tommi Mäkinen	2
(Spain) Flavio Alonso	0

Semi-finals
(Finland) Marcus Grönholm	2
(France) Didier Auriol	0
(France) Gilles Panizzi	0
(Finland) Tommi Mäkinen	2

Final
(Finland) Marcus Grönholm	0
(Finland) Tommi Mäkinen	2

== Nations' Cup ==
Group A

Team	Match Wins	Heat Wins	Best Total Time
ITA	3	7	5'52.41
Spain	2	6	5'56.44
USA	1	5	5'55.56
Japan	0	0	6'06.63

Group B

Team	Match Wins	Heat Wins	Best Total Time
France	3	7	5'48.82
Finland	1	4	5'51.76
All-Stars	1	4	5'56.59
Germany	1	3	5'52.11

Semi-finals
Italy	2
Finland	1
Spain	0
France	3

Final
Italy	0
France	3
