= 1998 Race of Champions =

Seasons
- ← 1997 1999 →

The 1998 Race of Champions took place on December 6 at Gran Canaria. It was the 11th running of the event, and the 7th running at Gran Canaria. It was the final year that the event was exclusively for rally drivers. Colin McRae was the victor after beating brother Alister in the final.

== Participants ==
Driver	Reason for Qualification
(United Kingdom) Colin McRae	World Rally champion in 1995
(France) Didier Auriol	World Rally champion in 1994
(Spain) Carlos Sainz	World Rally champion in 1990 and 1992
(United Kingdom) Alister McRae	Winner in the International Masters
(Germany) Armin Schwarz	Finalist in the International Masters
(Sweden) Thomas Rådström	3rd in the International Masters
(Sweden) Stig Blomqvist	Winner in the Legends Race
(Italy) Miki Biasion	Finalist in the Legends Race

== Legends Race ==
- Björn Waldegård & Timo Salonen eliminated in the first round.

Semi-finals
(Sweden) Stig Blomqvist	2
(Finland) Ari Vatanen	1
(Italy) Miki Biasion	2
(Finland) Hannu Mikkola	0

Final
(Sweden) Stig Blomqvist	?
(Italy) Miki Biasion	?

== International Masters ==
Quarter-finals
(Germany) Armin Schwarz	1
(Belgium) Jean-Pierre van de Wauwer	0
(Spain) Flavio Alonso	0
(Finland) Marcus Grönholm	1
(Sweden) Thomas Rådström	1
(Australia) Neal Bates	0
(United Kingdom) Alister McRae	1
(Italy) Andrea Aghini	0

Semi-finals
(Germany) Armin Schwarz	1
(Finland) Marcus Grönholm	0
(Sweden) Thomas Rådström	0
(United Kingdom) Alister McRae	1

Final
(Germany) Armin Schwarz	1
(United Kingdom) Alister McRae	2

== Race of Champions ==
Quarter-finals
(United Kingdom) Colin McRae	1
(Italy) Miki Biasion	0
(France) Didier Auriol	1
(Germany) Armin Schwarz	0
(Sweden) Thomas Rådström	0
(United Kingdom) Alister McRae	1
(Spain) Carlos Sainz	1
(Sweden) Stig Blomqvist	0

Semi-finals
(United Kingdom) Colin McRae	1
(France) Didier Auriol	0
(United Kingdom) Alister McRae	1
(Spain) Carlos Sainz	0

Final
(United Kingdom) Colin McRae	2
(United Kingdom) Alister McRae	1
