= Colin McRae =

Scottish rally driver (1968–2007)

Colin McRae MBE
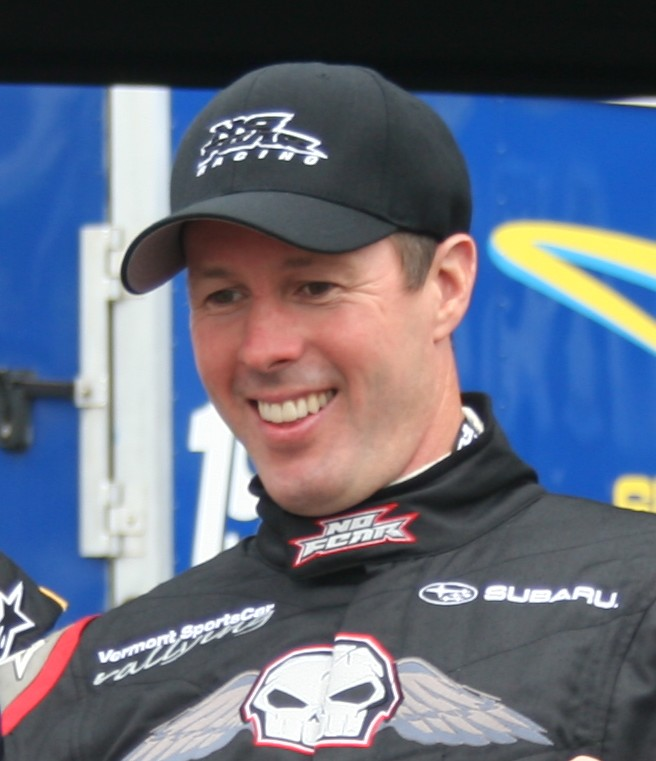
- McRae at the X Games XIII in 2007

Personal information
- Nationality: (Scotland) Scottish
- Full name: Colin Steele McRae
- Born: 5 August 1968; Lanark, Scotland
- Died: 15 September 2007 (aged 39); Lanark, Scotland

World Rally Championship record
- Years active: 1987–2003, 2005–2006
- Co-driver: (Scotland) Derek Ringer (Wales) Nicky Grist
- Teams: Subaru, Citroën, Ford, Škoda
- Rallies: 146
- Championships: 1 (1995)
- Rally wins: 25
- Podiums: 42
- Stage wins: 460
- Total points: 626
- First rally: 1987 Swedish Rally
- First win: 1993 Rally New Zealand
- Last win: 2002 Safari Rally
- Last rally: 2006 Rally of Turkey

Colin Steele McRae MBE (5 August 1968 – 15 September 2007) was a Scottish rally driver. He was the 1991 and 1992 British Rally Champion, and in 1995 became the first Scottish driver to win the World Rally Championship Drivers' title.

At the age of 27, McRae was the youngest-ever World Champion, a record that stood until 2022. McRae's performances with the Subaru World Rally Team enabled the team to win the World Rally Championship Manufacturers' title three times in succession in 1995, 1996 and 1997. After four years with the Ford Motor Co. team, where McRae won nine events, he moved to Citroën World Rally Team in 2003, where, despite not winning an event, he helped them win their first manufacturers' title. He was appointed a Member of the Order of the British Empire (MBE) for services to motorsport in 1996. With 25 victories in the WRC, McRae held the record for the most wins in the series at the time of his retirement from full-time rallying in 2003.

In 2007, McRae was killed when the helicopter he was piloting crashed near his home. His son and two family friends were also killed.

== Personal life ==
McRae was born in Lanark, Scotland, to Jimmy and Margaret McRae. Jimmy McRae was the five-time winner of the British Rally Championship. McRae was the eldest of three brothers; his middle brother, Alister McRae, is also a rally car driver. McRae's maternal uncle Hugh "Shug" Steele was also a former rally driver. He attended Robert Owen Primary School and Lanark Grammar School and studied for a year at Coatbridge College. He worked at Archie's Autos then at his father's plumbing and heating business as a technician.

McRae was married to Alison (née Hamilton), whom he met aged 19 when she acted as his co-driver, and had two children, Hollie and Johnny. McRae moved to the principality of Monaco in 1995, partly through his friendship with David Coulthard. However, as his young family grew up, he spent more time back at his home in Lanarkshire. The couple bought the 17th-century Jerviswood House. McRae's nephew, Max McRae, is also a motorsport racer.

In 1996, McRae was appointed a Member of the Order of the British Empire for services to motorsports in the Birthday Honours list.

== Career ==
=== Early career ===
McRae began his competitive career in motorsport riding trial bikes at an early age, despite being more interested in four-wheeled machines rather than two-wheel bikes. He became the Scottish schoolboy motocross champion at the age of 13. At the age of 16, through the Coltness Car Club, McRae found autotesting, obtained a Mini Cooper and started competing. A year later, he began to negotiate with another club member to use a borrowed Hillman Avenger GT for the Kames Stages, a single-venue stage rally not far from McRae's home. McRae finished the event thirteenth; first in his class although he had run most of the event in a higher position.

In 1986, driving a Talbot Sunbeam, McRae entered the Scottish Rally Championship with Ian Grindrod, his father's co-driver, as his co-driver, and soon made a name for himself with his speed and exciting style of driving. His driving style drew many comparisons to Finnish ex-World Rally Champion Ari Vatanen, whom McRae had always idolised.

McRae's first WRC event was the 1987 Swedish Rally in a Vauxhall Nova where he finished 36th overall, and again two years later, driving the Sierra and finishing 15th overall. In 1988 he took the Scottish Rally Championship series crown in his Vauxhall Nova. His next car was a Ford Sierra XR 4x4. In 1989, he finished fifth overall at Rally New Zealand in a rear-wheel-drive Sierra Cosworth. In 1990, McRae achieved sixth place in that year's RAC Rally, despite several accidents. In 1991, McRae turned professional as he was signed by Prodrive boss David Richards to his Subaru team in the British Rally Championship for an annual wage of approximately £10,000. McRae was British Rally Champion in both 1991 and 1992, soon graduating to the Subaru factory team at World Rally Championship level. In 1992, McRae made his debut in the British Touring Car Championship, with a one-off appearance for the Prodrive-run BMW factory team at the Knockhill round, where he collided with Matt Neal. Race officials found McRae to have caused an avoidable collision and subsequently disqualified him.

=== World Rally Championship ===
==== 1993–1998: Subaru ====
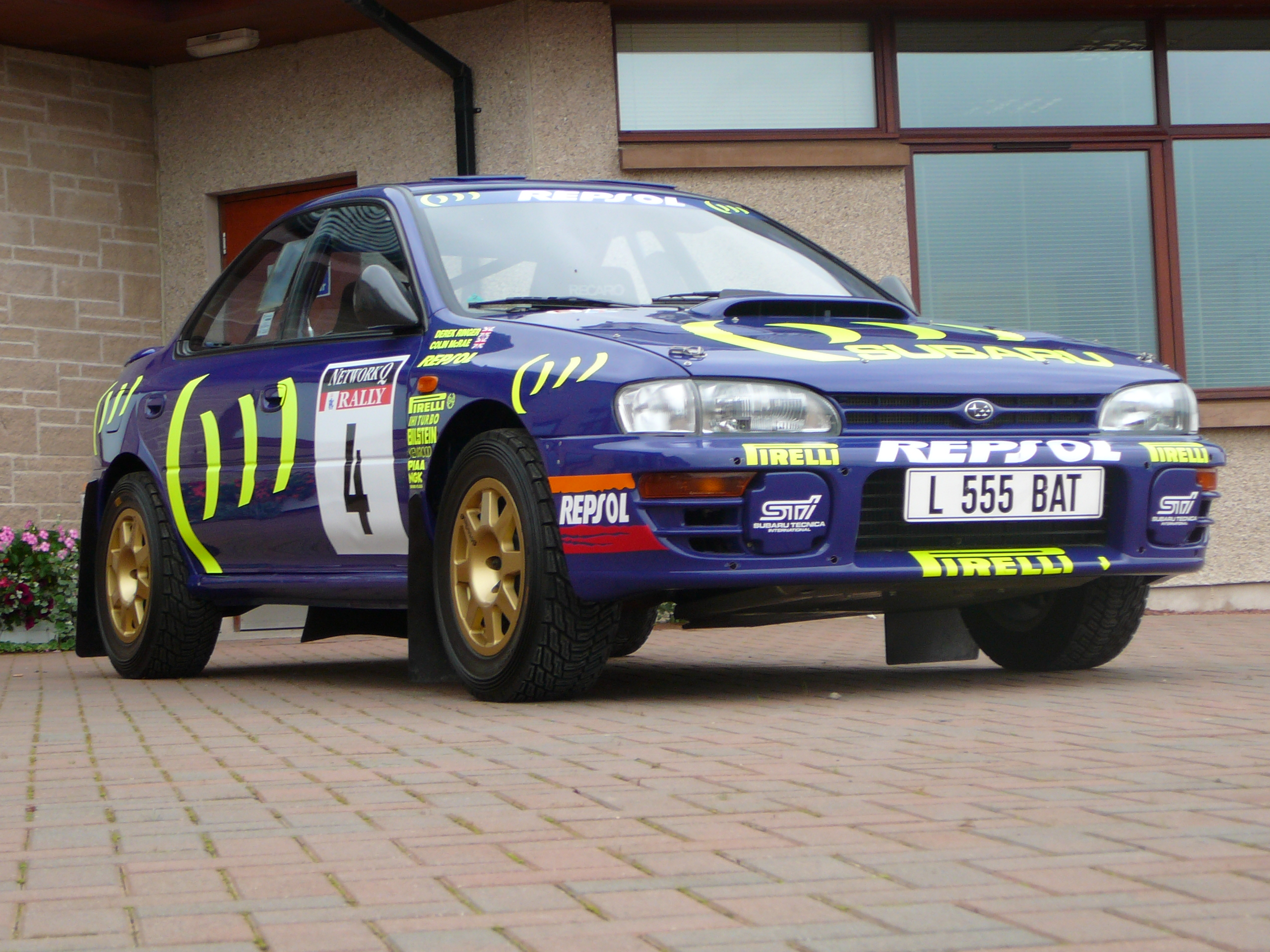
McRae's Subaru Impreza which he drove to win the 1995 World Rally Championship

On his promotion for 1993, McRae initially drove the Prodrive-built Group A Subaru Legacy alongside Finns Ari Vatanen, Hannu Mikkola and Markku Alén. McRae then won his first WRC rally in the car at that year's Rally New Zealand. It was also the first rally win for the newly formed Subaru World Rally Team, shortly before the Legacy was due to be pensioned off in favour of the new Subaru Impreza 555. Such were the rising fortunes of his young Subaru factory team as they competed against the frontrunning Toyota-powered Team TTE, who were excluded from the championship after the 1995 Rally Catalunya due to the use of an illegal air restrictor. It took only until 1995 for McRae to win the driver's title, which he secured with a victory in a straight contest with his double champion teammate, Carlos Sainz, on the season-ending Rally of Great Britain. Although still a winner with the outfit in individual rallies in succeeding years, including, increasingly, more specialised events such as the Acropolis Rally, Safari Rally and the Tour de Corse, McRae could not better second place in the standings in either 1996 or 1997, on both occasions behind Finland and Mitsubishi Ralliart's Tommi Mäkinen. He helped Subaru complete their run of three consecutive manufacturers' titles during this time. In what would turn out to be his final season with the team, in 1998 he won three more rallies and placed third in the standings, as well as winning the Race of Champions in Gran Canaria, the Canary Islands.

==== 1999–2002: Ford ====
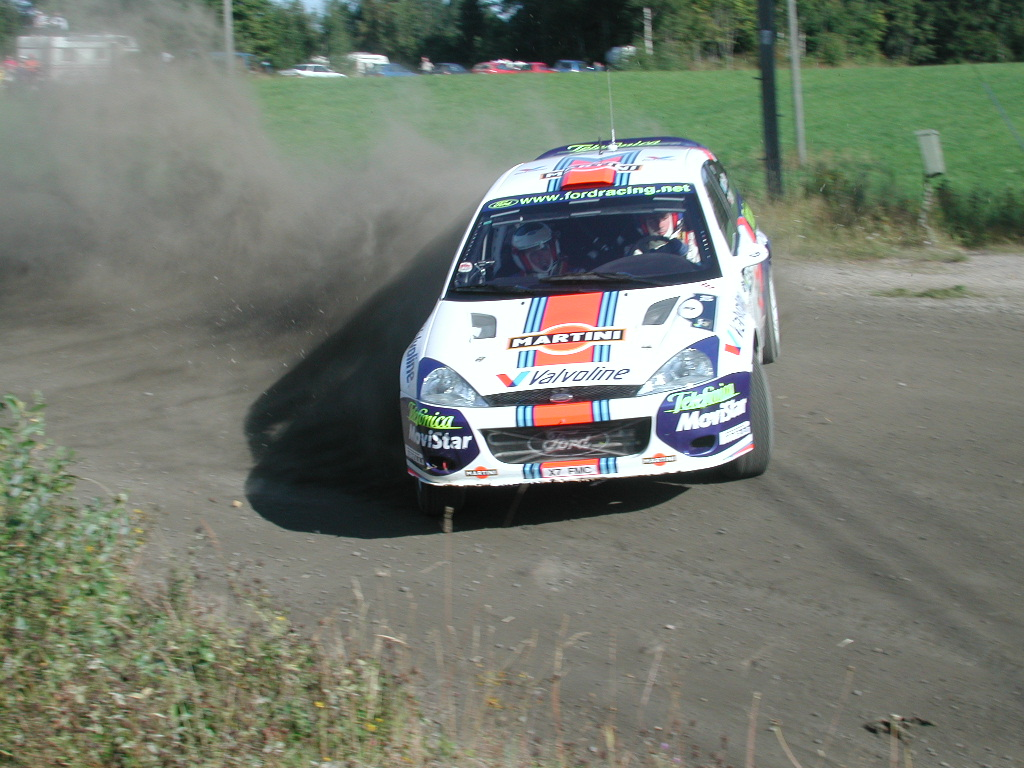
McRae with a Ford Focus WRC at the 2001 Rally Finland

After several years of varying success, McRae switched to the M-Sport-run Ford factory team for 1999, driving the new Ford Focus rally car. The deal saw McRae earning six million pounds over two years, which at the time made him the highest-earning rally driver in history. He immediately had two consecutive wins at the Safari Rally and Rally Portugal. The new car had many shunts and reliability issues for much of the rest of that season, however, which resulted in only sixth place in the championship standings overall. Moreover, a rare personal pointless run had begun for McRae that year which only stopped with a podium on the following February's Swedish Rally. McRae went on to be victorious on the asphalt turns of Catalunya and the gravel of Greece, and post fourth in the 2000 overall standings. Midway through the 2000 season, the lacking reliability of the Focus led to McRae threatening to leave the team if the problems continued. The upturn towards the end of the season resulted in him deciding to renew his contract with Ford for a further two years.

McRae's intermittent success with Ford continued into 2001, where after failing to score in any of the first four rounds, including having momentarily led defending winner Tommi Mäkinen on the stages of the season-opening Monte Carlo Rally before being forced into retirement, he then went on to score three consecutive victories in Argentina, Cyprus and Greece to tie with Mäkinen at the top of the points table. However, having again led the championship outright entering the final round in Great Britain, McRae once more missed out on a possible second title, crashing out and finishing second in the driver's championship, two points behind Subaru's Richard Burns.

With victory in the Safari Rally in 2002, McRae made the record books as the driver with most event wins in the World Rally Championship. His record was broken by Carlos Sainz. McRae's contract with Ford came to an end following the 2002 season, and after reportedly asking for wages of five million pounds a year, Ford decided against renewing the contract, reluctant to commit such a high amount of their budget to a driver's salary. The two parties split into amicable terms, with Ford's European director of motorsport Martin Whitaker stating "On behalf of all of us at Ford Motor Company I would like to publicly thank Colin and Nicky for their efforts during the past four years with the Ford team. I wish them both well in the future." McRae said of his time with Ford "It's been a very successful four years, we've achieved a lot of very good results and I'm quite happy that myself and Ford have had a very successful partnership."

==== 2003: Citroën ====
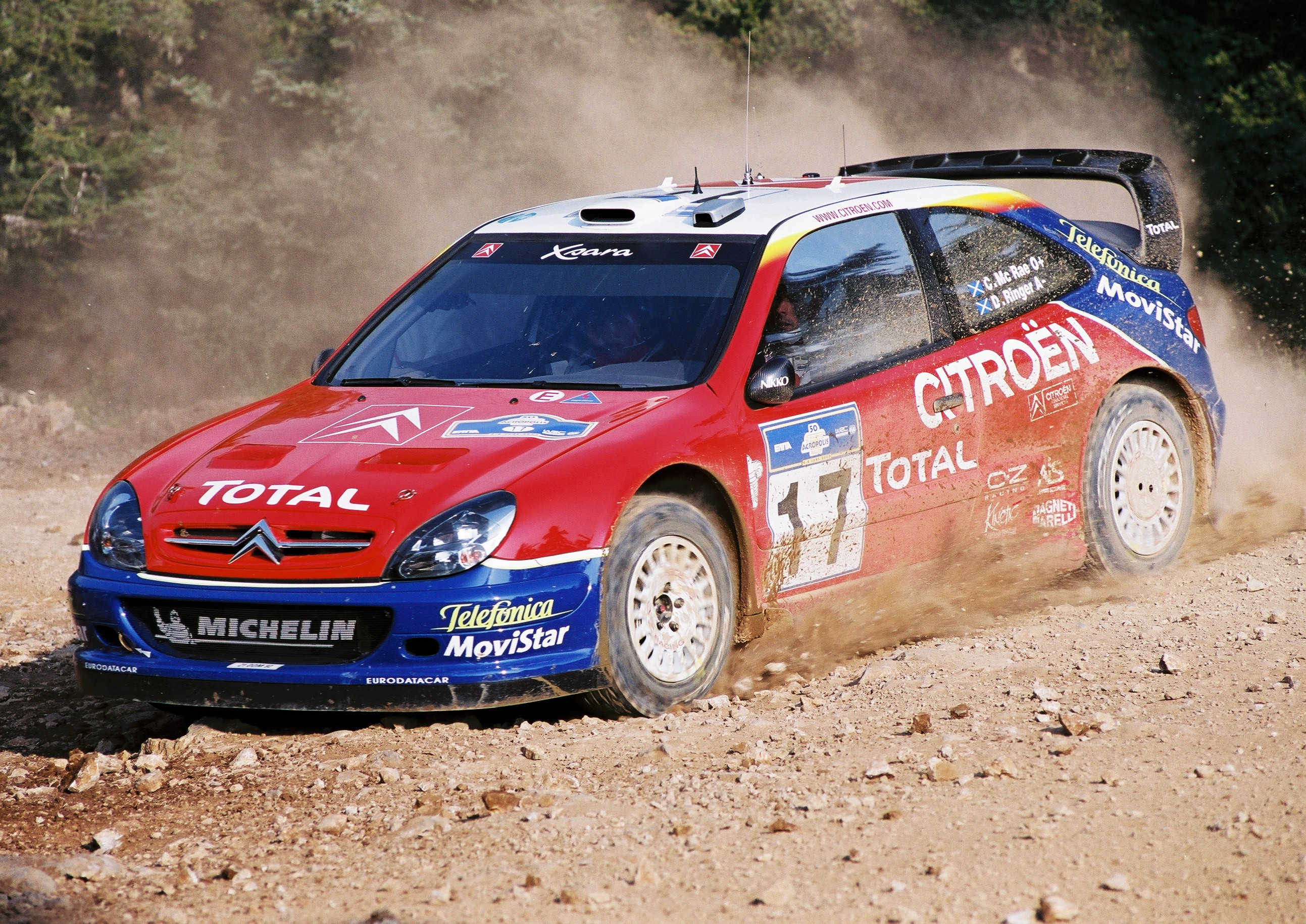
McRae with a Citroën Xsara WRC at the 2003 Rally Acropolis

For 2003, McRae signed for Citroën, a team of winning pedigree due to its successes of the previous year with young Frenchman Sébastien Loeb but otherwise undertaking its first complete campaign at World Rally Championship level. McRae's second-place finish on his début in Monte Carlo alongside Loeb and Carlos Sainz whom, aboard the Xsara WRC, helped complete a 1–2–3 finish, the finest result he would achieve for the team, as he ended the season in seventh in the drivers' championship, with no victories. Rule changes are brought in for the 2004 season changing the previous practice of having three nominated points-scorers within a team to two. With Loeb partway through a multiple-year contract, this meant the Citroën factory team, under Guy Fréquelin's leadership, was forced to choose between dropping McRae or Sainz. With Sainz being the more successful of the two during the 2003 season, McRae had to look elsewhere for 2004. David Richards, McRae's former boss at Subaru, who had by now taken over WRC's commercial rights holders ISC and worried that the loss of a character like McRae would damage his ability to market the sport, set about trying to help McRae find a drive for 2004. McRae was unable to find a team, and for the first time in over ten years he would not be competing in the World Rally Championship.

=== Later career ===
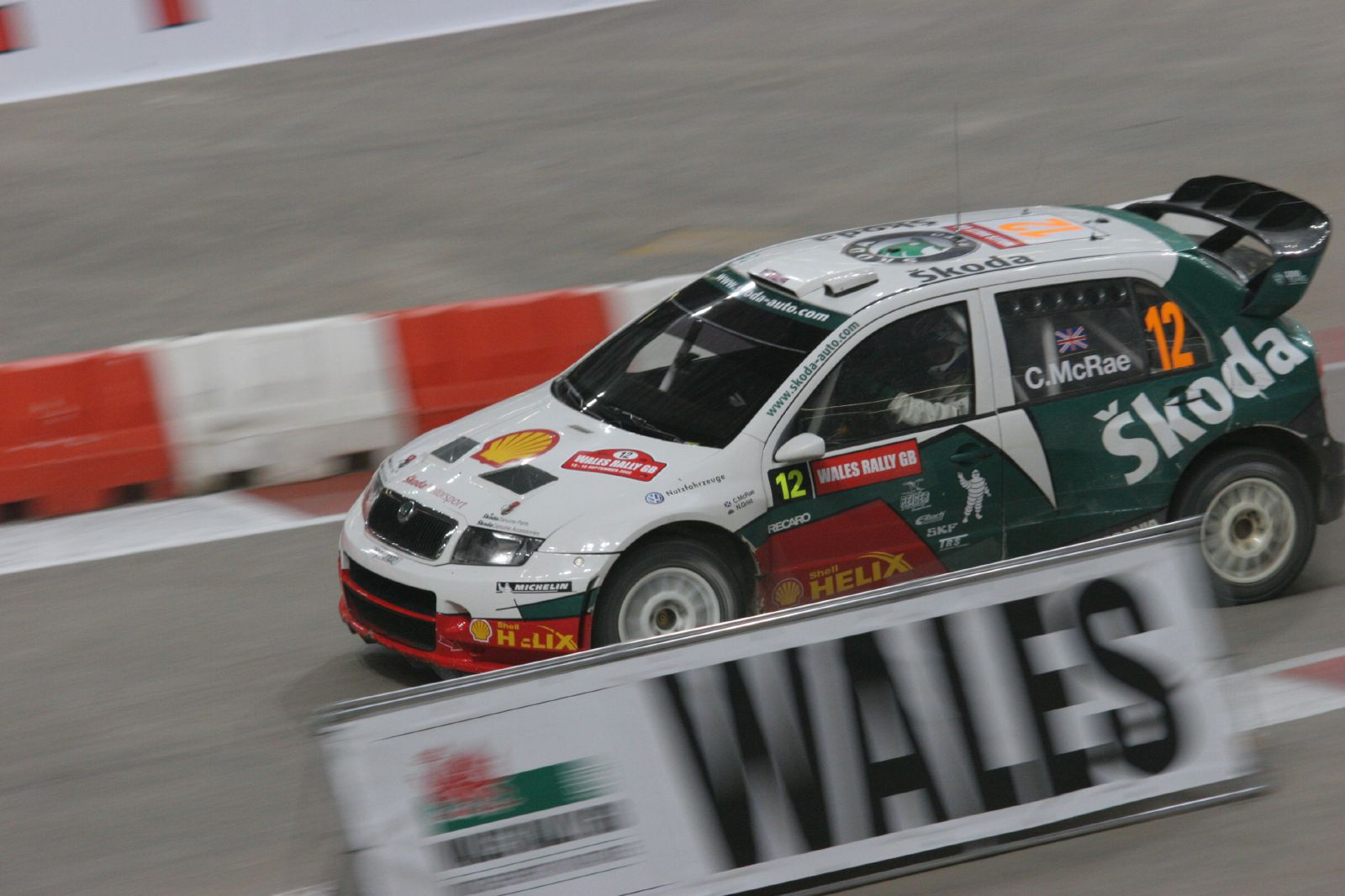
McRae driving a Škoda Fabia WRC on the Millennium Stadium, Cardiff super special stage of the 2005 Rally GB

McRae also competed in racing series other than the World Rally Championship. In September 2002 he took part in an ASCAR Racing Series event at the Rockingham Motor Speedway, Northamptonshire, finishing in sixth place.

McRae rejoined Prodrive for the 2004 24 Hours of Le Mans where he took third place in the GTS class, and ninth position overall in a Ferrari 550-GTS Maranello partnering Darren Turner and Rickard Rydell. Le Mans winner Allan McNish commented that "Colin has adapted far better than people expected" to endurance sportscar racing.

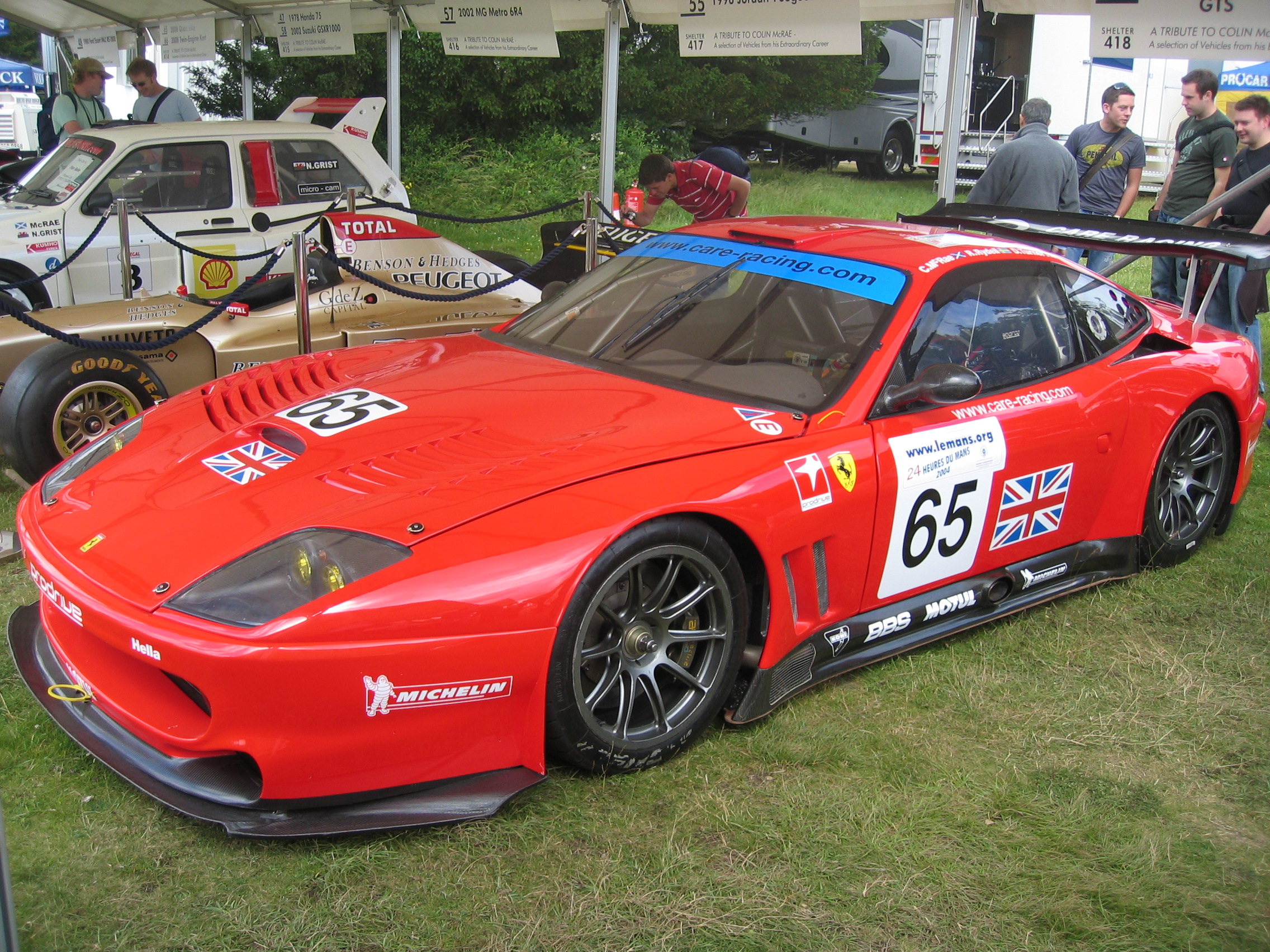
The Ferrari 550-GTS Maranello driven by McRae at the 2004 24 Hours of Le Mans

McRae made his debut on the Dakar Rally with Nissan in January 2004, and scored two stage wins. He returned to the Dakar in 2005 and was fastest on two of the first three stages in Morocco, before crashing out of the rally towards the end of stage six.

In 2004 and 2005, McRae represented Great Britain in the Race of Champions Nations Cup alongside Formula One driver and fellow Scot, David Coulthard. For the 2006 event, England and Scotland entered separate teams with McRae and Coulthard re-uniting to represent Scotland.

In 2005, McRae competed in the Baja 500 Portalegre, winning the competition.

McRae then returned to the series for one-off drives for Škoda on the 2005 Rally GB and Rally Australia, respectively finishing seventh and retiring due to a clutch problem on the final leg of the rally, the latter ending prospects of Škoda's best finish.

On 5 August 2006, McRae competed for Subaru in the first live televised American rally in Los Angeles as part of the X-Games. McRae rolled the car on the penultimate corner after landing awkwardly from a jump, which damaged the front bumper and left front tyre. Despite this, McRae kept the car running and continued on to the finish, his time only 0.13 seconds slower than eventual winner Travis Pastrana. He was unexpectedly entered for his final rally by semi-works Kronos Citroën at Rally Turkey in September, where he replaced Sébastien Loeb while the Frenchman recovered from an injury he sustained in a cycling accident immediately prior to the event. A final-stage alternator problem led to him retiring from seventh place. He was subsequently dropped by Citroën for the upcoming Rally Australia and replaced by Xavier Pons.

24 Hours of Le Mans career
- Years: 2004
- Teams: Prodrive Racing
- Best finish: 9th overall, 3rd in class (2004)
- Class wins: 0

In August 2007, McRae said he was still hoping to find a seat for the 2008 WRC season, but said that "if it doesn't happen next year, then I won't (return) because you can only be out of something at that level for so long." In 2007, talking to Autosport podcast, David Richards confirmed that he and McRae had talked about McRae's comeback to Subaru for season 2008. Robert Reid was contacted by McRae to be his co-driver and the pair were due to test together, but McRae died before the test could take place.

== Death ==
2007 Lanark helicopter crash
Accident
- Date: 15 September 2007
- Summary: Pilot error
- Site: Lanark, Scotland, United Kingdom

Aircraft
- Aircraft type: Eurocopter AS350B2 Squirrel
- Registration: G-CBHL
- Occupants: 4
- Fatalities: 4
- Survivors: 0

McRae died on 15 September 2007 whilst piloting his private helicopter, a Eurocopter AS350B2 Squirrel, which crashed one mile (1.6 km) north of Lanark, Scotland, close to the McRae family home. He was not licensed to fly the aircraft. McRae's five-year-old son Johnny, and two family friends, Graeme Duncan and Johnny's six-year-old friend Ben Porcelli, also died in the crash. McRae's previously active website, ColinMcRae.com, was later replaced with a memorial screen stating a few details about the crash, and then with a short statement released on behalf of McRae's father, Jimmy, and later a book of condolences.

=== Funeral and celebration services ===
The funeral for Colin and Johnny took place on 26 September at Daldowie Crematorium near Glasgow, conducted by the Rev Tom Houston, who had married the McRaes, and the Rev Steven Reid, chaplain at Johnny's school. An address was given by Robbie Head, a former rally driver and commentator who was a close friend of McRae's, with the Rev Houston giving the benediction. McRae's niece and nephews performed the tune Highland Cathedral, a popular funeral song. The song "(Sittin' On) The Dock of the Bay" by Otis Redding, a favourite song of McRae's, was played when the family entered the chapel. The Proclaimers' song "I'm on My Way" was played when they left. Colin and Johnny McRae were cremated in the same coffin. Among the attendees at the funeral were fellow Scottish racing drivers Jackie Stewart and Dario Franchitti.

A "Celebration of Life" service took place at St Nicholas Church in Lanark on Sunday 30 September at 4 p.m. Images from McRae's career and personal life were displayed on large video screens outside the church. Around 700 mourners filled the church, with crowds of up to 15,000 outside. Shortly before 4 p.m., Martin Hewins, McRae's personal bagpiper for many years, played "Flower of Scotland" as the family arrived at the church. The service was conducted by the Rev Alison Meikle, who said "Two weeks ago Lanark was struck by silence. A terrible silence bought at an enormous price. However, in our tears love is stronger than death." Later, the Kenny Rogers and Dolly Parton song "Islands in the Stream", a favourite of Johnny's, was played. Friends of the pair shared poems and anecdotes from the McRaes' lives. After the service, Colin McRae's widow, brother and father bowed and applauded the crowds who had gathered outside to pay tribute to the McRaes.

=== Reaction ===
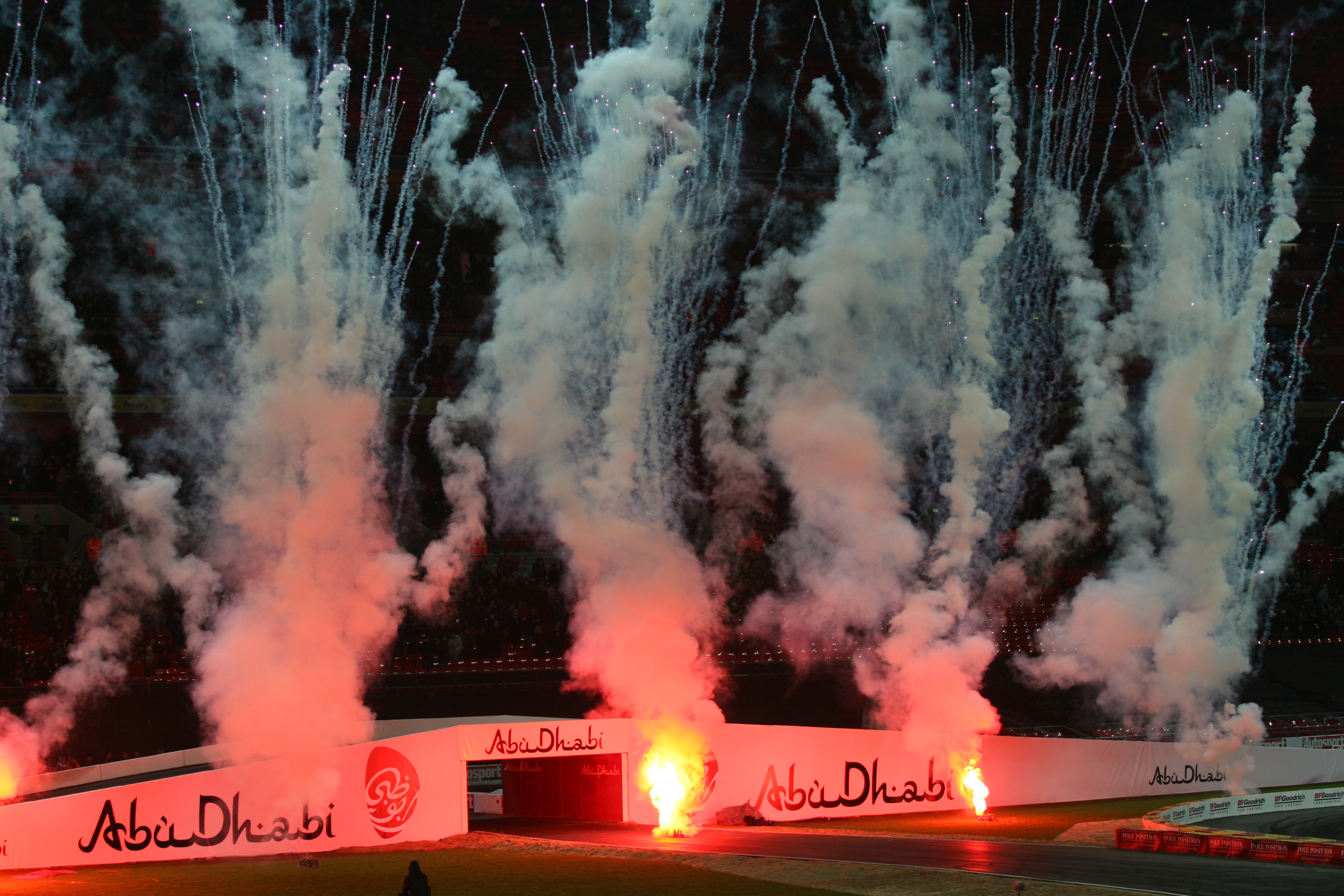
McRae tribute during the 2007 Race of Champions

The announcement of McRae's death took place during qualifying for the 2007 Belgian Grand Prix with ITV commentator James Allen informing viewers of the news. Formula One driver David Coulthard, a friend of McRae, who was due to represent Scotland along with him in the Race of Champions at Wembley Stadium on 16 December, described him as "an understated yet fantastically talented individual", and announced that he would race the 2007 Japanese Grand Prix with a helmet livery similar to McRae's as a tribute. During the finale of the 2007 Scottish Rally Championship, the "Colin McRae Forest Stages" held in Perth in September 2007, there was no number-1 car, as McRae had been due to drive the course car on the event. Instead, his car was parked at the starting point of the rally, where fans were able to sign a book of condolences.

Following his win at the Brands Hatch meeting of the 2007 World Touring Car Championship season, Andy Priaulx dedicated it to McRae, commenting that his death "shows how fragile life can be". McRae's former rival, four-time World Rally Champion Tommi Mäkinen commented the helicopter accident as terrifying news, and described McRae as "a pleasant fellow and a tough rival". Valentino Rossi, who was taught the basics of driving a rally car by McRae, said he was shocked and saddened by McRae's death. He dedicated his win at the 2007 Portuguese motorcycle Grand Prix to McRae, saying "I want to dedicate this to Colin McRae. He was one of my big idols when I was very young, and it's because of him I have a big passion for rally".

=== Investigation ===
After the crash, an investigative team from the Air Accidents Investigation Branch attended the scene in cooperation with Strathclyde Police. The wreckage of the helicopter was removed to Farnborough for further forensic investigation. A report into the accident was published on 12 February 2009. In it, the AAIB did not reach a definite conclusion as to the cause of the accident, stating instead that "the helicopter crashed in a wooded valley while manoeuvering at high speed and low height. It was intact before impact, and the available evidence indicated that the engine was delivering power. The cause of the accident was not positively determined. Although no technical reason was found to explain the accident, a technical fault could not be ruled out entirely. However, it is more likely that the pilot attempted a turning manoeuvre at a low height, during which the helicopter deviated from its intended flight path; whether due to the pilot encountering handling difficulties, misjudgement, spatial disorientation, distraction or a combination of such events. There were indications that the pilot had started recovery but, with insufficient height in which to complete it, the helicopter struck trees in the valley and crashed, killing all four occupants." Ben Porcelli's parents had not given McRae permission to take their son in the helicopter.

On 6 September 2011, a fatal accident inquiry into the accident concluded that McRae was at fault for the crash. Sheriff Nikola Stewart stated, after the 16-day inquiry, that McRae had been engaged in "unnecessary and unsafe" low-level flying at the time of the crash, and that as a private pilot, he was unqualified and untrained to fly at such a level. McRae's flying licence was also found to have expired in 2005, and his "valid type rating" for the helicopter had expired in March 2007.

=== Legacy ===
In memory of McRae, the Swedish Rally organisers set up an award for the longest jump over a crest on the Vargåsen stage of the rally. The inaugural winner of the award, named Colin's Crest, was Ford's United Arab Emirates driver Khalid al-Qassimi, who recorded a distance of 30 m.

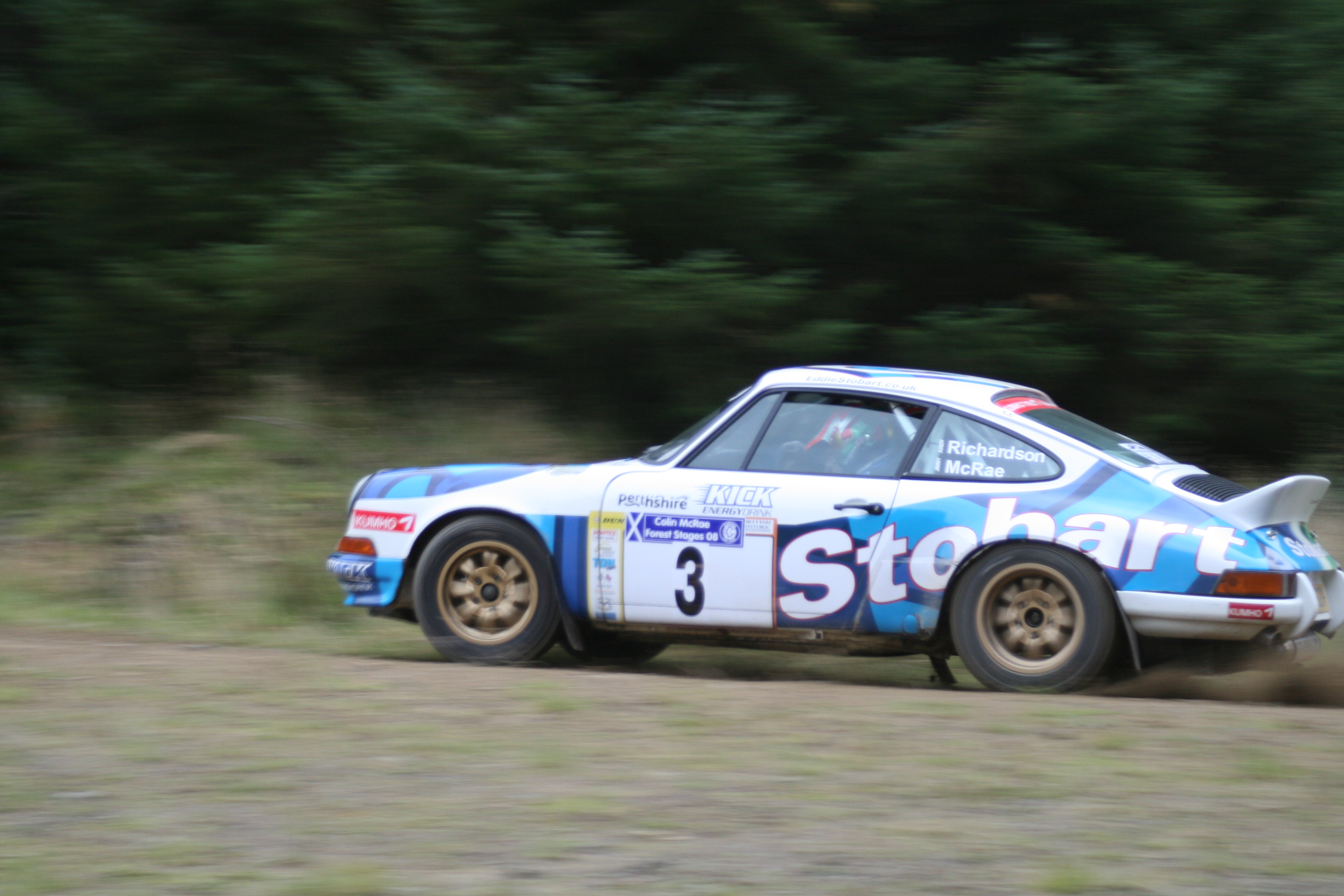
McRae's father, Jimmy, driving a Porsche 911 at the 2008 Colin McRae Forest Stages

On 27 September 2008, the Colin McRae Forest Stages Rally took place in Perth, Scotland. An enhanced entry list of several former big-name rally drivers took part in McRae's memory. The entry list included ex-World Championship drivers Hannu Mikkola, Ari Vatanen (partnered by his 1981 WRC winning co-driver David Richards), Björn Waldegård, Malcolm Wilson, Russell Brookes, Jimmy McRae, Andrew Cowan and Louise Aitken-Walker, many competing in their original cars. A handful of current WRC drivers also took part including Matthew Wilson, Kris Meeke and Travis Pastrana. The outright winner was Stobart VK M-Sport Ford Rally Team driver Matthew Wilson in a Ford Focus WRC. McRae's brother Alister McRae won the classic category.

In November 2008, McRae was posthumously inducted into the Scottish Sports Hall of Fame.

In 2015, 20 years from when McRae won the 1995 WRC Championship, an exhibition of memorabilia, including cars, was displayed at a service park at 2015 Rally GB.

In November 2020, a documentary celebrating the 25th anniversary of McRae's WRC win was released.

Kenyan race car driver McRae Kimathi is named after him.

== Colin McRae Rally video game series ==
Codemasters released the first Colin McRae Rally video game in 1998. Version 2, known as Colin McRae Rally 2.0, was released in 2000, for Sony's PlayStation and Microsoft Windows; it was also ported to the Game Boy Advance in 2002. A third version found a wide audience on Windows and Xbox. Versions 04 and 2005 arrived in 2004 on all major platforms. 2005 was also remade for Sony's PlayStation Portable and Nokia's N-Gage.

Colin McRae: Dirt was the title for the next instalment of the series, which launched in 2007 for Microsoft Windows, PlayStation 3 and Xbox 360. The PlayStation 3 edition was released in the UK on 14 September, the day before McRae's death. An adaptation of the game for mobile phones was released by Codemasters Mobile.

Colin McRae: Dirt 2 was released on the Wii on 8 September 2009, it released on PlayStation 3, and Xbox 360 on 11 September 2009, the PC version was released on 8 December 2009. This was the last mainline game in the series to bear the 'Colin McRae' moniker.

On 27 June 2013, a remastered version of Colin McRae Rally 2.0, simply titled Colin McRae Rally, was released for iOS devices, with ports to Android and Windows released in 2014.

== Colin McRae R4 ==
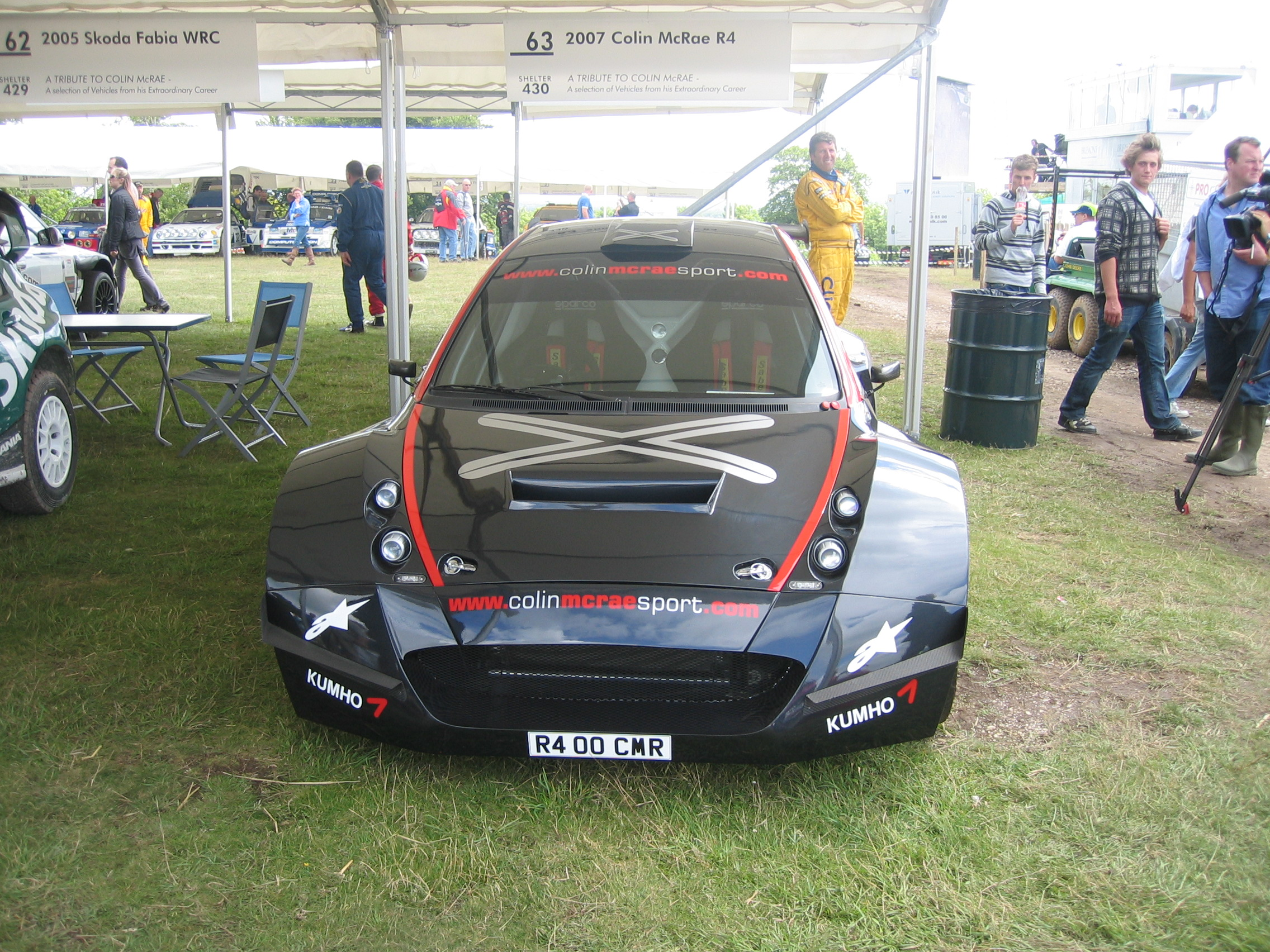
A Colin McRae R4 on display at the Goodwood Festival of Speed

In 2003, McRae started designing a rally car named the McRae R4, which he debuted at the Goodwood Festival of Speed in 2007. It was designed to be an economic alternate to other rally cars, with an additional focus on safety.

Built by DJM Race Preparation, the McRae R4's chassis is based on a steel safety cage with carbon panelling front and rear, and a steel-covered cockpit area. Suspension consists of twin wishbones with Proflex dampers. The process of designing the car was assisted by Codemasters, who created a 3D model of the car based on initial sketches done by DJM Motorsport. The bodywork of the car is loosely based on a first-generation Ford Ka bodyshell, deemed to be the optimal choice in terms of size, shape and weight.

The engine is a naturally aspirated, four-cylinder, 2.5-litre Millington Diamond Engine producing 350 BHP. Transmission is via a six-speed gearbox, manual or semi-automatic, and by mechanical front and rear differentials with the option of mechanical or active central differential. The car can be produced in either two- or four-wheel-drive formats.

== Racing record ==
=== Complete World Rally Championship results ===
Year	Entrant	Car	1	2	3	4	5	6	7	8	9	10	11	12	13	14	15	16	Pos	Points
1987	Colin McRae	Vauxhall Nova	MON	SWE; 36	POR	KEN	FRA	GRC	USA	NZL	ARG	FIN	CIV	ITA					—	0
1987	British Junior Rally Team	Vauxhall Nova													GBR; Ret				—	0
1988	Peugeot Talbot Sport	Peugeot 205 GTI	MON	SWE	POR	KEN	FRA	GRC	USA	NZL	ARG	FIN	CIV	ITA	GBR; Ret				—	0
1989	Colin McRae	Ford Sierra XR 4x4	SWE; 15	MON	POR	KEN	FRA	GRC		ARG	FIN	AUS	ITA	CIV					34th	8
1989	Gary Smith Motorsport	Ford Sierra RS Cosworth							NZL; 5										34th	8
1989	R.E.D.	Ford Sierra RS Cosworth													GBR; Ret				34th	8
1990	Shell UK Oil	Ford Sierra RS Cosworth 4x4	MON	POR	KEN	FRA	GRC	NZL	ARG	FIN	AUS	ITA	CIV	GBR; 6					34th	6
1991	Subaru Rally Team Europe	Subaru Legacy RS	MON	SWE	POR	KEN	FRA	GRC	NZL	ARG	FIN	AUS	ITA	CIV	ESP	GBR; Ret			—	0
1992	Subaru Rally Team Europe	Subaru Legacy RS	MON	SWE; 2	POR	KEN	FRA	GRC; 4	NZL; Ret	ARG	FIN; 8	AUS	ITA	CIV	ESP	GBR; 6			8th	34
1993	555 Subaru World Rally Team	Subaru Legacy RS	MON	SWE; 3	POR; 7		FRA; 5	GRC; Ret	ARG	NZL; 1	FIN	AUS; 6	ITA	ESP					5th	50
1993	555 Subaru World Rally Team	Subaru Impreza 555													GBR; Ret				5th	50
1993	Subaru M.S.G.	Subaru Vivio Sedan 4WD				KEN; Ret													5th	50
1994	555 Subaru World Rally Team	Subaru Impreza 555	MON; 10	POR; Ret	KEN	FRA; Ret	GRC; DSQ	ARG; Ret	NZL; 1	FIN	ITA; 5	GBR; 1							4th	49
1995	555 Subaru World Rally Team	Subaru Impreza 555	MON; Ret	SWE; Ret	POR; 3	FRA; 5	NZL; 1	AUS; 2	ESP; 2	GBR; 1									**1st**	**90**
1996	555 Subaru World Rally Team	Subaru Impreza 555	SWE; 3	KEN; 4	IDN; Ret	GRC; 1	ARG; Ret	FIN; Ret	AUS; 4	ITA; 1	ESP; 1								**2nd**	**92**
1997	555 Subaru World Rally Team	Subaru Impreza WRC 97	MON; Ret	SWE; 4	KEN; 1	POR; Ret	ESP; 4	FRA; 1	ARG; 2	GRC; Ret	NZL; Ret	FIN; Ret	IDN; Ret	ITA; 1	AUS; 1	GBR; 1			**2nd**	**62**
1998	555 Subaru World Rally Team	Subaru Impreza WRC 98	MON; 3	SWE; Ret	KEN; Ret	POR; 1	ESP; Ret	FRA; 1	ARG; 5	GRC; 1	NZL; 5	FIN; Ret	ITA; 3	AUS; 4	GBR; Ret				**3rd**	**45**
1999	Ford Motor Co.	Ford Focus WRC	MON; DSQ	SWE; Ret	KEN; 1	POR; 1	ESP; Ret	FRA; 4	ARG; Ret	GRC; Ret	NZL; Ret	FIN; Ret	CHN; Ret	ITA; Ret	AUS; Ret	GBR; Ret			6th	23
2000	Ford Motor Co.	Ford Focus RS WRC 00	MON; Ret	SWE; 3	KEN; Ret	POR; Ret	ESP; 1	ARG; Ret	GRC; 1	NZL; 2	FIN; 2	CYP; 2	FRA; Ret	ITA; 6	AUS; Ret	GBR; Ret			4th	43
2001	Ford Motor Co.	Ford Focus RS WRC 01	MON; Ret	SWE; 9	POR; Ret	ESP; Ret	ARG; 1	CYP; 1	GRC; 1	KEN; Ret	FIN; 3	NZL; 2	ITA; 8	FRA; 11	AUS; 5	GBR; Ret			**2nd**	**42**
2002	Ford Motor Co.	Ford Focus RS WRC 02	MON; 4	SWE; 6	FRA; Ret	ESP; 6	CYP; 6	ARG; 3	GRC; 1	KEN; 1	FIN; Ret	GER; 4	ITA; 8	NZL; Ret	AUS; Ret	GBR; 5			4th	35
2003	Citroën Total	Citroën Xsara WRC	MON; 2	SWE; 5	TUR; 4	NZL; Ret	ARG; Ret	GRC; 8	CYP; 4	GER; 4	FIN; Ret	AUS; 4	ITA; 6	FRA; 5	ESP; 9	GBR; 4			7th	45
2005	Škoda Motorsport	Škoda Fabia WRC	MON	SWE	MEX	NZL	ITA	CYP	TUR	GRC	ARG	FIN	GER	GBR; 7	JPN	FRA	ESP	AUS; Ret	22nd	2
2006	Kronos Citroën World Rally Team	Citroën Xsara WRC	MON	SWE	MEX	ESP	FRA	ARG	ITA	GRC	GER	FIN	JPN	CYP	TUR; Ret	AUS	NZL	GBR	—	0

World Rally Championship victories
#	Event	Season	Co-driver	Car
1	23rd Rothmans Rally of New Zealand	1993	(Scotland) Derek Ringer	Subaru Legacy RS
2	24th Rothmans Rally of New Zealand	1994	(Scotland) Derek Ringer	Subaru Impreza 555
3	(United Kingdom) 50th Network Q Rally	1994	(Scotland) Derek Ringer	Subaru Impreza 555
4	25th Smokefree Rally New Zealand	1995	(Scotland) Derek Ringer	Subaru Impreza 555
5	(United Kingdom) 51st Network Q Rally	1995	(Scotland) Derek Ringer	Subaru Impreza 555
6	43rd Acropolis Rally of Greece	1996	(Scotland) Derek Ringer	Subaru Impreza 555
7	(Italy) 38° Rally Sanremo – Rallye d'Italia	1996	(Scotland) Derek Ringer	Subaru Impreza 555
8	(Spain) 32° Rallye Catalunya-Costa Brava (Rallye de España)	1996	(Scotland) Derek Ringer	Subaru Impreza 555
9	45th Safari Rally Kenya	1997	(Wales) Nicky Grist	Subaru Impreza WRC 97
10	41ème Tour de Corse – Rallye de France	1997	(Wales) Nicky Grist	Subaru Impreza WRC 97
11	(Italy) 39° Rally Sanremo – Rallye d'Italia	1997	(Wales) Nicky Grist	Subaru Impreza WRC 97
12	10th API Rally Australia	1997	(Wales) Nicky Grist	Subaru Impreza WRC 97
13	(United Kingdom) 53rd Network Q Rally	1997	(Wales) Nicky Grist	Subaru Impreza WRC 97
14	31° TAP Rallye de Portugal	1998	(Wales) Nicky Grist	Subaru Impreza WRC 98
15	42ème Tour de Corse – Rallye de France	1998	(Wales) Nicky Grist	Subaru Impreza WRC 98
16	45th Acropolis Rally of Greece	1998	(Wales) Nicky Grist	Subaru Impreza WRC 98
17	47th Safari Rally Kenya	1999	(Wales) Nicky Grist	Ford Focus WRC
18	32° TAP Rallye de Portugal	1999	(Wales) Nicky Grist	Ford Focus WRC
19	(Spain) 36° Rallye Catalunya-Costa Brava (Rallye de España)	2000	(Wales) Nicky Grist	Ford Focus RS WRC 00
20	(Greece) 47th Acropolis Rally	2000	(Wales) Nicky Grist	Ford Focus RS WRC 00
21	21° Rally Argentina	2001	(Wales) Nicky Grist	Ford Focus RS WRC 01
22	29th Cyprus Rally	2001	(Wales) Nicky Grist	Ford Focus RS WRC 01
23	(Greece) 48th Acropolis Rally	2001	(Wales) Nicky Grist	Ford Focus RS WRC 01
24	(Greece) 49th Acropolis Rally	2002	(Wales) Nicky Grist	Ford Focus RS WRC 02
25	(Kenya) 50th Inmarsat Safari Rally	2002	(Wales) Nicky Grist	Ford Focus RS WRC 02

=== WRC summary ===
Season	Team	Starts	Victories	Podiums	Stage wins	DNF	Points	Final result
1987	Private	1	0	0	0	0	0	NC
1987	British Junior Rally Team	1	0	0	0	1	0	NC
1988	Peugeot Talbot Sport	1	0	0	0	1	0	NC
1989	Private	1	0	0	0	0	0	34th
1989	Gary Smith Motorsport	1	0	0	0	0	8	34th
1989	R.E.D.	1	0	0	0	1	0	34th
1990	Shell UK Oil	1	0	0	4	0	6	34th
1991	Subaru Rally Team Europe	1	0	0	0	1	0	NC
1992	Subaru Rally Team Europe	5	0	1	16	1	34	8th
1993	555 Subaru World Rally Team	7	1	2	39	2	50	5th
1993	Subaru M.S.G.	1	0	0	0	1	0	5th
1994	555 Subaru World Rally Team	8	2	2	51	3	49	4th
1995	555 Subaru World Rally Team	8	2	5	47	2	90	1st
1996	555 Subaru World Rally Team	9	3	4	46	3	92	2nd
1997	555 Subaru World Rally Team	14	5	6	78	6	62	2nd
1998	555 Subaru World Rally Team	13	3	5	62	5	45	3rd
1999	Ford Motor Co.	14	2	2	25	10	23	6th
2000	Ford Motor Co.	14	2	6	36	7	43	4th
2001	Ford Motor Co.	14	3	5	35	5	42	2nd
2002	Ford Motor Co.	14	2	3	13	4	35	4th
2003	Citroën Total	14	0	1	8	3	45	7th
2005	Škoda Motorsport	2	0	0	0	1	2	22nd
2006	Kronos Citroën World Rally Team	1	0	0	0	1	0	NC
Total		146	25	42	460	58	626	

=== Complete British Touring Car Championship results ===
(key) (Races in bold indicate pole position) (Races in italics indicate fastest lap)

Year	Team	Car	1	2	3	4	5	6	7	8	9	10	11	12	13	14	15	DC	Pts
1992	M Team Mobil	BMW 318is	SIL; 1	THR; 1	OUL; 1	SNE; 1	BRH; 1	DON; 1	DON; 2	SIL; 1	KNO; 1; 8	KNO; 2 DSQ	PEM; 1	BRH; 1	BRH; 2	DON; 1	SIL; 1	25th	1

=== Complete 24 Hours of Le Mans results ===
Year	Team	Co-Drivers	Car	Class	Laps	Pos.	Class pos.
2004	(United Kingdom) Prodrive Racing	(United Kingdom) Darren Turner (Sweden) Rickard Rydell	Ferrari 550-GTS Maranello	GTS	329	9th	**3rd**

=== Complete Porsche Supercup results ===
(key) (Races in bold indicate pole position – 2 points awarded 2008 onwards in all races) (Races in italics indicate fastest lap)

Year	Team	Car	1	2	3	4	5	6	7	8	9	10	11	12	DC	Points
2006	Morellato Stars Team	Porsche 997 GT3	BHR	ITA1	GER1; 23†	ESP	MON; 10	GBR	USA1	USA2	FRA	GER2	HUN	ITA2	NC‡	0‡

† — Did not finish the race, but was classified as he completed over 90% of the race distance.

‡ — Not eligible for points due to being a guest driver.

Awards and achievements
Preceded by David Llewellin	Autosport; National Rally Driver of the Year; 1991–1992	Succeeded by Richard Burns
Preceded by Juha Kankkunen	Autosport; International Rally Driver Award; 1994–1995	Succeeded by Tommi Mäkinen
Preceded by Tommi Mäkinen	Autosport; International Rally Driver Award (shared with Tommi Mäkinen); 1997	Succeeded by Tommi Mäkinen
Sporting positions
Preceded by Didier Auriol	World Rally Champion; 1995	Succeeded by Tommi Mäkinen
Preceded by Carlos Sainz	Race of Champions; Champion of Champions; 1998	Succeeded by Didier Auriol
Records
Preceded by Juha Kankkunen; 27 years, 249 days (1986 season)	Youngest World Rally Champion; 27 years, 109 days (1995 season)	Succeeded by Kalle Rovanperä; 22 years, 1 day (2022 season)
Preceded by Tommi Mäkinen; 24 wins (1987–2003)	Most rally wins 25 wins, 25th at the 2002 Safari Rally	Succeeded by Carlos Sainz; 26 wins, 26th at the 2004 Rally Argentina
