= 1999 Race of Champions =

Seasons
- ← 1998 2000 →

The 1999 Race of Champions took place on December 5 at Gran Canaria. It was the 12th running of the event, and the eighth running at Gran Canaria. It was the first year for the new Nations' Cup Competition, which saw teams of three competitors – a rally driver, a circuit racing driver and a motorcyclist – team up to represent their nation and compete for national glory.

The vehicles used were the Peugeot 306 Maxi, The Mitsubishi Lancer Evolution V WRC, the Toyota Corolla WRC and the ROC Buggy.

The individual competition was won by Didier Auriol for a fourth time, whilst the inaugural Nations' Cup was won by Finland with JJ Lehto, Tommi Mäkinen and Kari Tiainen.

== Participants ==
=== Race of Champions ===
Driver	Reason for Qualification
(Finland) Tommi Mäkinen	World Rally champion in 1996, 1997, 1998 and 1999
(France) Didier Auriol	World Rally champion in 1994
(Spain) Carlos Sainz	World Rally champion in 1990 and 1992
(Germany) Armin Schwarz	Winner in the International Masters
(Finland) Marcus Grönholm	Finalist in the International Masters
(France) Gilles Panizzi	Beat Alister McRae in a play-off
(Sweden) Stig Blomqvist	Winner in the Legends Race
(Sweden) Björn Waldegård	Finalist in the Legends Race

=== Nations Cup ===
Country	Racing Driver	Rally Driver	Motorcycle Racer
France	Yannick Dalmas	Didier Auriol	David Vuillemin
Finland	JJ Lehto	Tommi Makinen	Kari Tiainen
Spain	Marc Gené	Carlos Sainz Sr.	Pere Riba
Italy	Emanuele Pirro	Miki Biasion	Luca Cadalora
Germany	Christian Abt	Armin Schwarz	Ralf Waldmann
All-Stars	(Finland) Harri Toivonen	(United Kingdom) Alister McRae	(Belgium) Joël Smets

- Toivonen replaced Danny Sullivan in the All-Stars team.

== Legends Race ==
- Walter Röhrl & Hannu Mikkola eliminated in the first round.

Semi-finals
(Sweden) Björn Waldegård	2
(Italy) Miki Biasion	1
(Sweden) Stig Blomqvist	2
(Finland) Timo Salonen	0

Final
(Sweden) Björn Waldegård	0
(Sweden) Stig Blomqvist	1

== International Masters ==
- Flavio Alonso and Luis Mónzon qualified for being the finalists for the Spanish Rally Masters competition.
- Toni Gardemeister was invited but could not attend.
- Michael Guest, Krzysztof Holowczyc, Markko Märtin and Adruzilo Lopes were eliminated in the first round.

Quarter-finals
(United Kingdom) Alister McRae	1'55.12
(Spain) Flavio Alonso	1'56.10
(France) François Delecour	2'00.71
(Finland) Marcus Grönholm	1'57.54
(France) Gilles Panizzi	1'56.23
(Uruguay) Gustavo Trelles	1'58.09
(Germany) Armin Schwarz	1'54.56
(Spain) Luis Mónzon	1'58.55

Semi-finals
(United Kingdom) Alister McRae	1'58.08
(Finland) Marcus Grönholm	1'56.58
(France) Gilles Panizzi	1'58.01
(Germany) Armin Schwarz	1'57.30

Final
(Finland) Marcus Grönholm	1'58.30
(Germany) Armin Schwarz	1'56.83

== Race of Champions ==
Quarter-finals
(Finland) Tommi Mäkinen	2
(Sweden) Björn Waldegård	0
(Spain) Carlos Sainz	2
(Finland) Marcus Grönholm	0
(France) Gilles Panizzi	1
(Germany) Armin Schwarz	2
(Sweden) Stig Blomqvist	0
(France) Didier Auriol	2

Semi-finals
(Finland) Tommi Makinen	2
(Spain) Carlos Sainz	0
(Germany) Armin Schwarz	1
(France) Didier Auriol	2

Final
(Finland) Tommi Mäkinen	1
(France) Didier Auriol	2

== Nations' Cup ==
- Germany & Italy eliminated in the first round.

Semi-finals
Spain	5
France	4
Finland	5
All-Stars	0

Final
Spain	4
Finland	5
