= Tommi Mäkinen =

Finnish rally driver (born 1964)

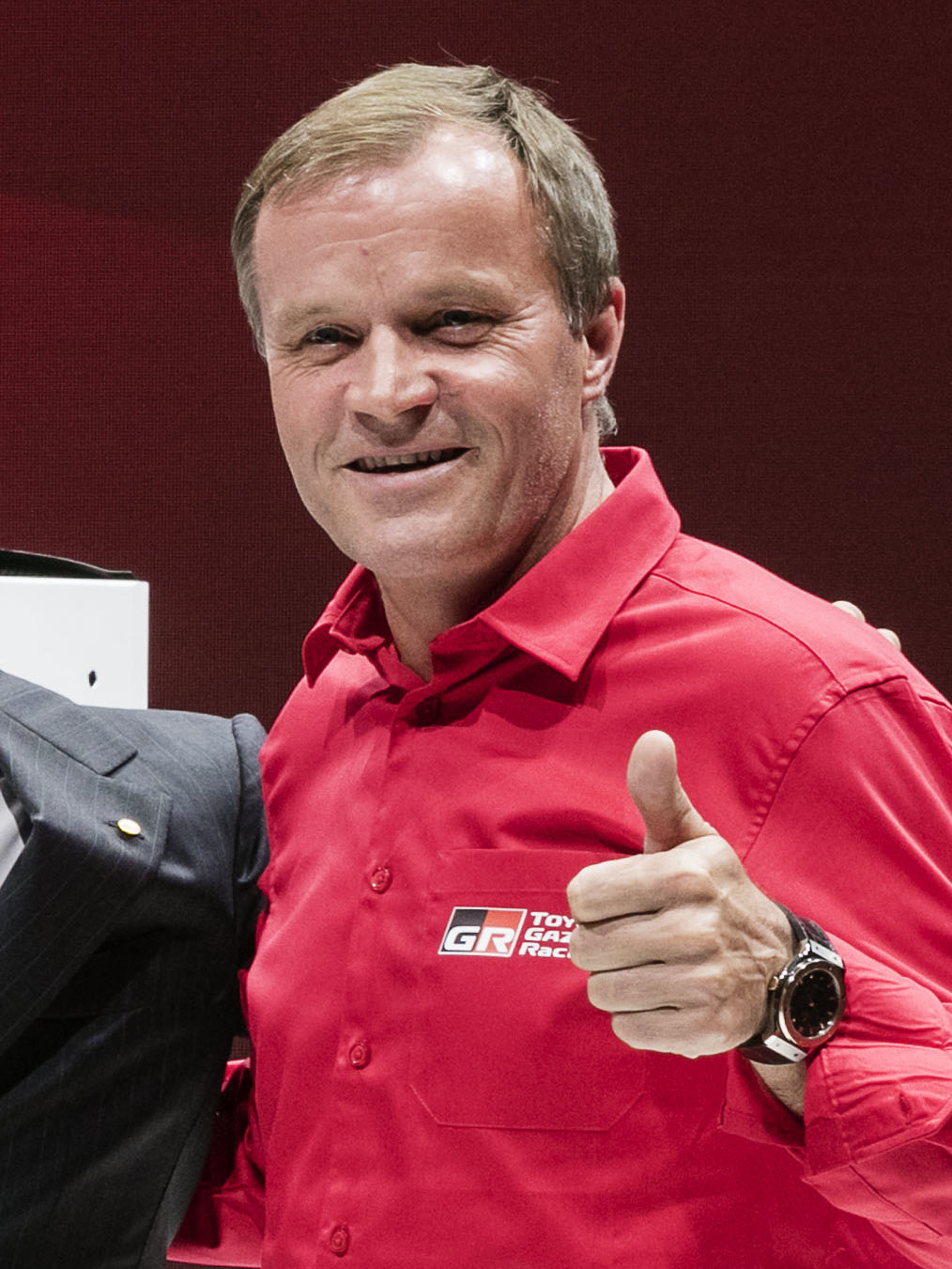
- Mäkinen in 2016

Personal information
- Nationality: (Finland) Finnish
- Full name: Tommi Antero Mäkinen
- Born: 26 June 1964 (age 62); Puuppola, Jyväskylä, Finland

World Rally Championship record
- Years active: 1987–2003
- Co-driver: (Finland) Jari Nieminen (Finland) Risto Mannisenmäki (United Kingdom) Rodney Spokes (Finland) Timo Hantunen (Finland) Seppo Harjanne (Finland) Kaj Lindström
- Teams: Mitsubishi, Subaru, Nissan
- Rallies: 139
- Championships: 4 (1996, 1997, 1998, 1999)
- Rally wins: 24
- Podiums: 45
- Stage wins: 361
- Total points: 544
- First rally: 1987 1000 Lakes Rally
- First win: 1994 1000 Lakes Rally
- Last win: 2002 Monte Carlo Rally
- Last rally: 2003 Rally Great Britain

Tommi Antero Mäkinen (Finnish pronunciation: [ˈtomːi ˈmækinen]; born 26 June 1964) is a Finnish racing executive and former rally driver. Mäkinen was the team principal of Toyota Gazoo Racing WRT from 2016 until his departure at the end of 2020, to become Toyota's motorsport advisor.

Mäkinen is one of the most successful World Rally drivers of all time, ranking fifth in rally wins (24) and third in championships (4), tied with Juha Kankkunen behind Sébastien Ogier (9) and Sébastien Loeb (9). In 2018, as a head of Toyota Gazoo Racing WRT, he became the first person in the history of rally driving to win a Championship both as a driver and as a team principal.

Mäkinen is a four-time World Rally Champion, a series he first won, and then successfully defended, continuously throughout 1996, 1997, 1998 and 1999, on all occasions driving the Ralliart Mitsubishi Lancer Evolution. He also aided Mitsubishi to the 1998 world constructors' title as well as winning the 2000 Race of Champions. Mäkinen's navigators include compatriots Seppo Harjanne, Kaj Lindström and Risto Mannisenmäki, the former retiring from alongside Mäkinen having previously served 1985 champion, and fellow "Flying Finn", Peugeot's Timo Salonen.

== Career ==
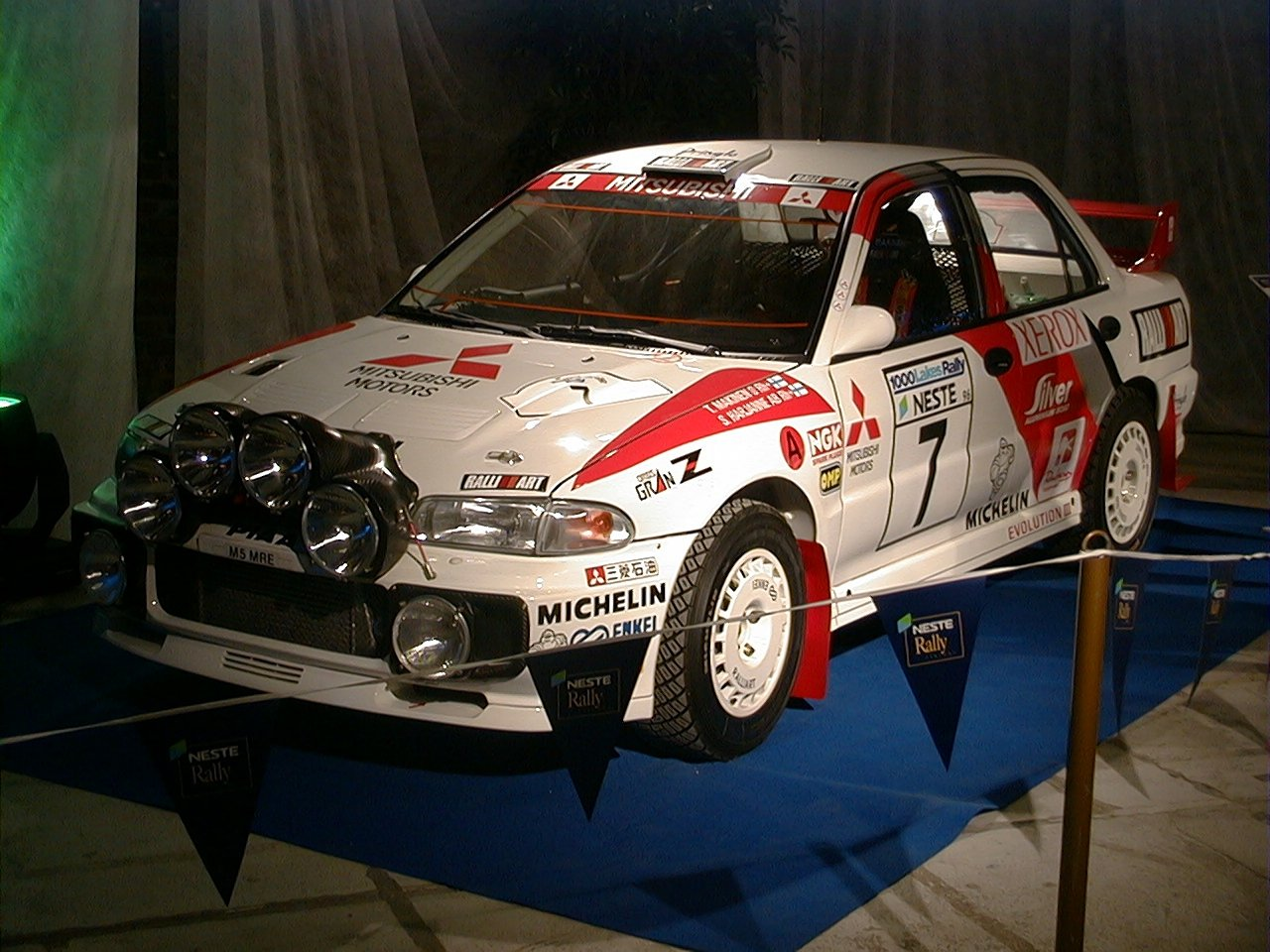
Mitsubishi Lancer Evo III, which Mäkinen used in the 1996 Rally Finland

Mäkinen won the Group N Finnish Rally Championship driving a Lancia Delta HF 4WD in 1988. Mäkinen's first world rally win came on the 1994 1000 Lakes Rally (now Rally Finland), in a Ford Escort RS Cosworth. Mäkinen proved a late developer by the standards of some in rallying circles, only nabbing his first full-time manufacturer seat in a Group A formula Mitsubishi Lancer Evolution alongside former Group A rally champion Swede Kenneth Eriksson, in 1995 - but success was to prove spontaneous thereafter.

A cultured Safari Rally win in 1996 proved the platform on which to build a dominant championship lead, which he consolidated by taking the title in Australia, away from runner-up, Subaru's Colin McRae - a long-time rival. He proceeded to win every drivers' title for Mitsubishi from 1996 to 1999. The Mitsubishi team, with the Finn and young Briton Richard Burns among its driver personnel, also won its sole manufacturers' championship in 1998, while late that same year, the licensed Tommi Mäkinen Rally video game was also released. In 2000, despite opening his campaign with victory on the January Monte Carlo Rally, Mäkinen finally relinquished his grasp on the title, being beaten in the standings by new title holder and fellow Finn, Marcus Grönholm. That year, Mitsubishi produced a 'Tommi Mäkinen edition' of the road version of the Lancer Evolution VI to commemorate his previous title successes. This car had a different front bumper than the regular Evolution VI, while some models also featured a red and white paint job to closely resemble Mäkinen's rally car.

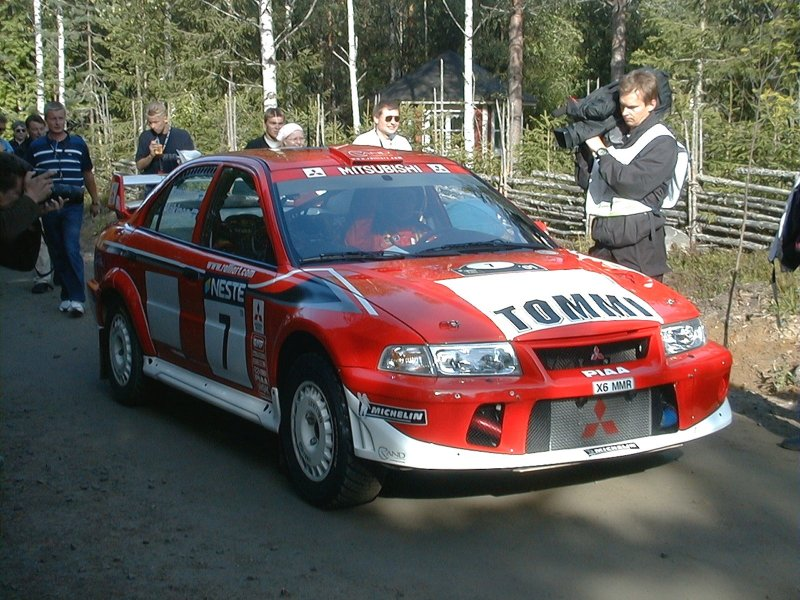
Mäkinen with a Mitsubishi Lancer Evo at the 2001 Rally Finland.

Mäkinen remained with Mitsubishi until the end of the 2001 season, having finished third in that year's standings behind Burns and McRae, by now respectively drivers for Subaru and Ford - but not before the inauspicious introduction of team's first ever World Rally Car on the San Remo Rally. Mäkinen and teammate Freddy Loix struggled with the car before the Finn's crash on the mountainside roads of the following round in Corsica was responsible for breaking co-driver Mannisenmäki's back and in doing so, virtually ended his top-line career. The Finn was forced to fare with substitute co-drivers for the remaining events in Australia (with Timo Hantunen) and Great Britain, the latter of which he retired from, helping Burns to claim the championship.

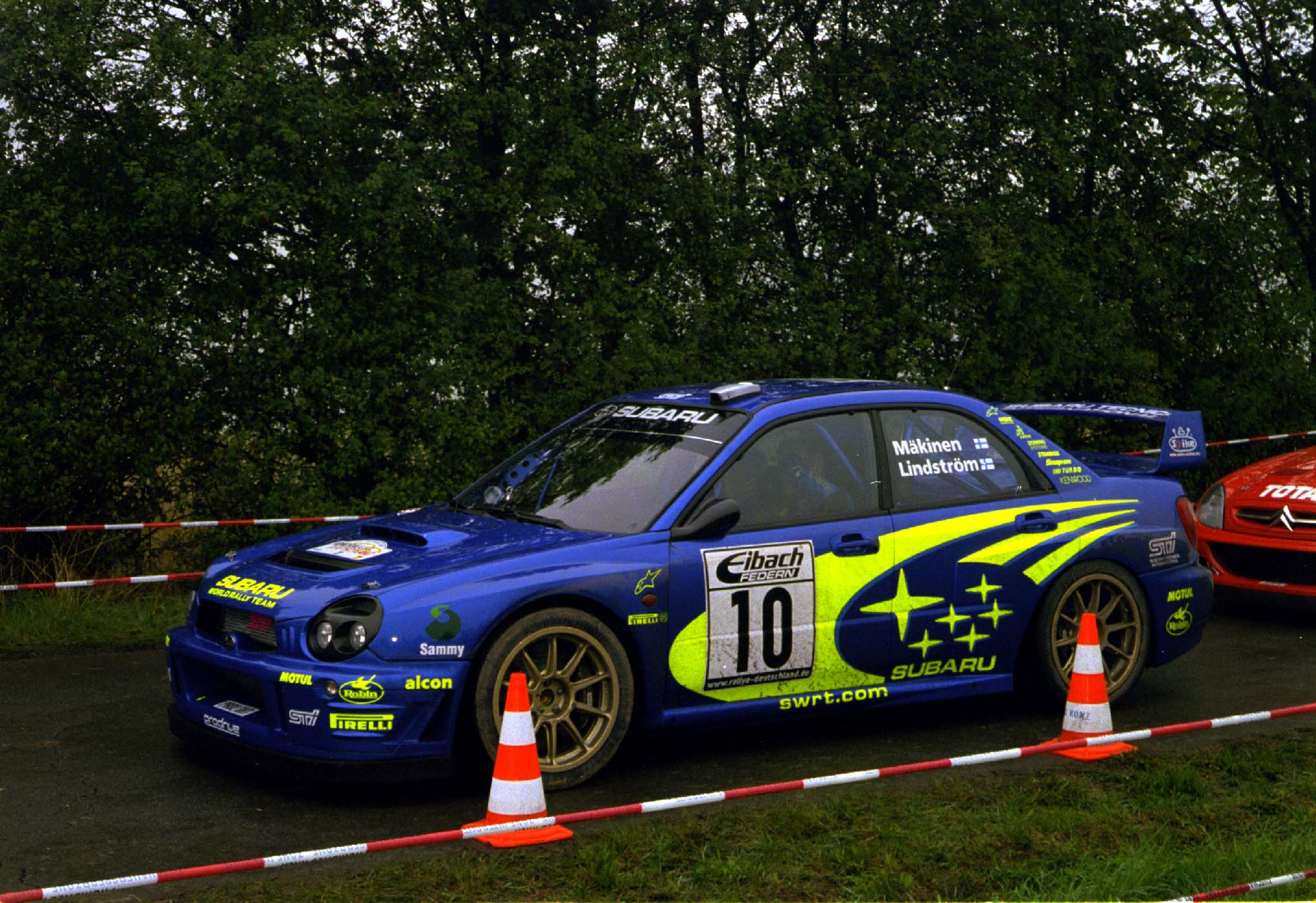
Mäkinen achieved his last victory with Subaru.

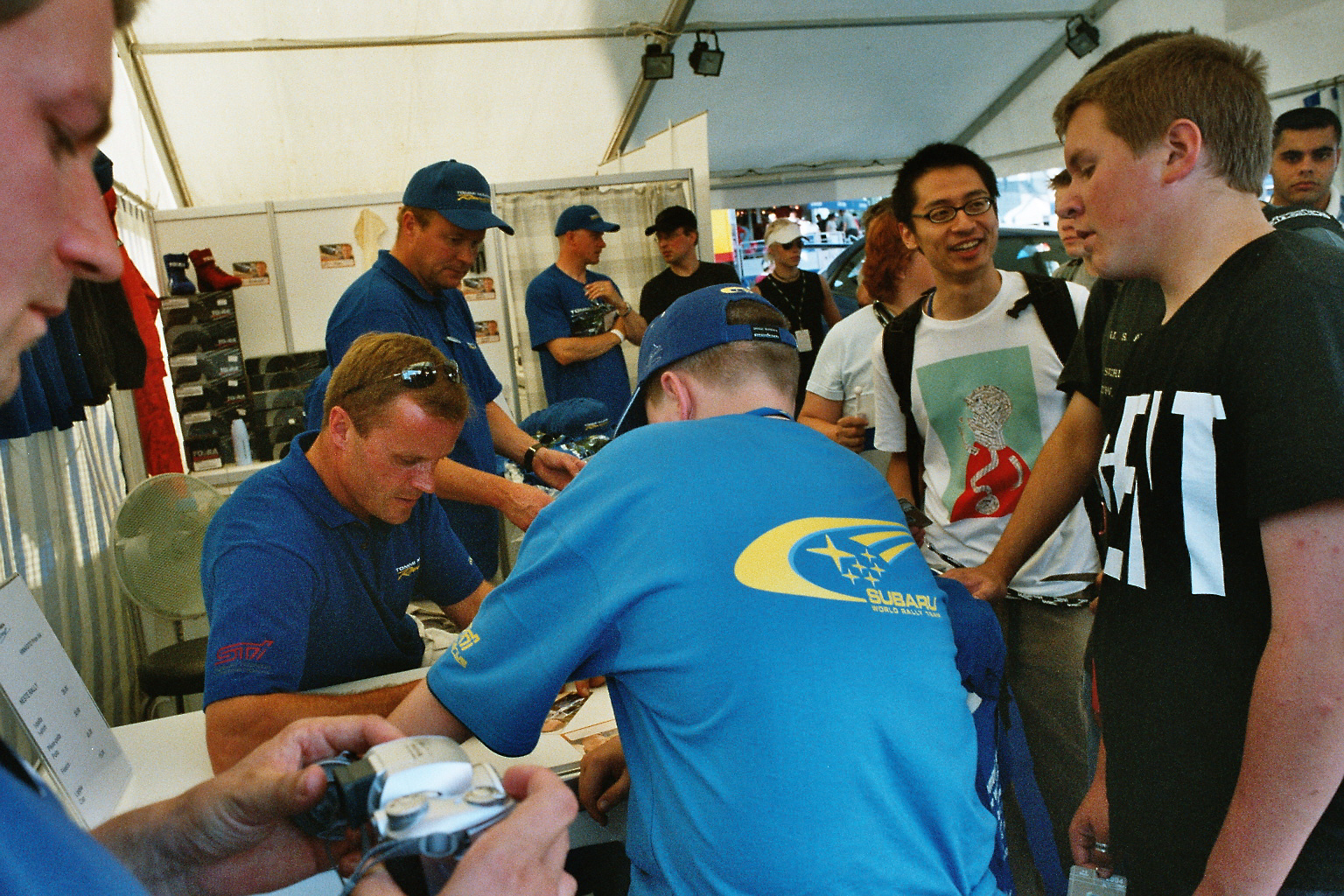
Mäkinen signing autographs in 2004

A move to the Prodrive-run Subaru World Rally Team for 2002 as replacement for Burns (who had chosen to drive a works Peugeot 206 WRC alongside Grönholm for his title defence) yielded one more, final career victory, on the 2002 Monte Carlo Rally where a technical infringement committed by on-the-road winner, and emerging talent, Sébastien Loeb, allowed Mäkinen to upstage the Frenchman. But his form then took a dive and he was not to add again to his tally of world titles.

Mäkinen retired from the sport after the 2003 season, ending his WRC career on the podium with third place on that seasons final rally, Rally Great Britain.

In 2004, Mäkinen established his own company named Tommi Mäkinen Racing Oy Ltd with the aim to prepare rally cars and provide support to drivers.

In 2016, Mäkinen became the team principal of the Toyota Gazoo Racing WRT, which is the factory team of Toyota and competes in the World Rally Championship (WRC). In 2018, the team managed to win the World Rally Championship earning Toyota their first manufacturers' title since 1999.

== Personal life ==
Mäkinen was born in Puuppola, near Jyväskylä, Finland. From 1999, he has lived in both Jyväskylä and Monte Carlo, Monaco. He is married, with two children.

== WRC victories ==
Number	Event	Season	Co-driver	Car
1	(Finland) 44th 1000 Lakes Rally	1994	(Finland) Seppo Harjanne	Ford Escort RS Cosworth
2	(Sweden) 45th International Swedish Rally	1996	(Finland) Seppo Harjanne	Mitsubishi Lancer Evo 3
3	44th Safari Rally Kenya	1996	(Finland) Seppo Harjanne	Mitsubishi Lancer Evo 3
4	16º Rally Argentina	1996	(Finland) Seppo Harjanne	Mitsubishi Lancer Evo 3
5	(Finland) 46th Neste 1000 Lakes Rally	1996	(Finland) Seppo Harjanne	Mitsubishi Lancer Evo 3
6	9th API Rally Australia	1996	(Finland) Seppo Harjanne	Mitsubishi Lancer Evo 3
7	30º TAP Rallye de Portugal	1997	(Finland) Seppo Harjanne	Mitsubishi Lancer Evo 4
8	(Spain) 33º Rallye Catalunya-Costa Brava (Rallye de España)	1997	(Finland) Seppo Harjanne	Mitsubishi Lancer Evo 4
9	17º Rally Argentina	1997	(Finland) Seppo Harjanne	Mitsubishi Lancer Evo 4
10	47th Neste Rally Finland	1997	(Finland) Seppo Harjanne	Mitsubishi Lancer Evo 4
11	(Sweden) 47th International Swedish Rally	1998	(Finland) Risto Mannisenmäki	Mitsubishi Lancer Evo 4
12	18º Rally Argentina	1998	(Finland) Risto Mannisenmäki	Mitsubishi Lancer Evo 5
13	48th Neste Rally Finland	1998	(Finland) Risto Mannisenmäki	Mitsubishi Lancer Evo 5
14	(Italy) 40º Rallye Sanremo - Rallye d'Italia	1998	(Finland) Risto Mannisenmäki	Mitsubishi Lancer Evo 5
15	11th API Rally Australia	1998	(Finland) Risto Mannisenmäki	Mitsubishi Lancer Evo 5
16	(Monaco) 67ème Rallye Automobile de Monte-Carlo	1999	(Finland) Risto Mannisenmäki	Mitsubishi Lancer Evo 6
17	(Sweden) 48th International Swedish Rally	1999	(Finland) Risto Mannisenmäki	Mitsubishi Lancer Evo 6
18	29th Rally New Zealand	1999	(Finland) Risto Mannisenmäki	Mitsubishi Lancer Evo 6
19	(Italy) 41º Rallye Sanremo - Rallye d'Italia	1999	(Finland) Risto Mannisenmäki	Mitsubishi Lancer Evo 6
20	(Monaco) 68ème Rallye Automobile de Monte-Carlo	2000	(Finland) Risto Mannisenmäki	Mitsubishi Lancer Evo 6
21	(Monaco) 69ème Rallye Automobile de Monte-Carlo	2001	(Finland) Risto Mannisenmäki	Mitsubishi Lancer Evo 6.5
22	35º TAP Rallye de Portugal	2001	(Finland) Risto Mannisenmäki	Mitsubishi Lancer Evo 6.5
23	49th Safari Rally Kenya	2001	(Finland) Risto Mannisenmäki	Mitsubishi Lancer Evo 6.5
24	(Monaco) 70ème Rallye Automobile de Monte-Carlo	2002	(Finland) Kaj Lindström	Subaru Impreza WRC2001

== WRC results ==
Year	Entrant	Car	1	2	3	4	5	6	7	8	9	10	11	12	13	14	WDC	Points
1987	Tommi Mäkinen	Lancia Delta HF 4WD	MON	SWE	POR	KEN	FRA	GRC	USA	NZL	ARG	FIN; Ret	CIV	ITA	GBR		-	0
1988	Tommi Mäkinen	Lancia Delta HF 4WD	MON	SWE	POR	KEN	FRA	GRC	USA	NZL	ARG	FIN; Ret	CIV	ITA			-	0
1988	Mu-Uutiset 4 Rombi Corse	Lancia Delta Integrale													GBR; Ret		-	0
1989	Tommi Mäkinen	Lancia Delta Integrale	SWE; Ret	MON	POR	KEN	FRA	GRC	NZL	ARG	FIN; Ret	AUS	ITA	CIV	GBR		-	0
1990	Pro Sport Rally Team	Mitsubishi Galant VR-4	MON	POR	KEN	FRA	GRC	NZL; 6	ARG	FIN; 11	AUS; 7	ITA; 13	CIV	GBR; Ret			24th	10
1991	Promoracing Finland	Ford Sierra RS Cosworth 4x4	MON	SWE; 13													31st	8
1991	Tommi Mäkinen	Ford Sierra RS Cosworth 4x4			POR; Ret	KEN	FRA	GRC									31st	8
1991	Promoracing Finland	Mitsubishi Galant VR-4							NZL; Ret	ARG							31st	8
1991	Mazda Rally Team Europe	Mazda 323 GTX									FIN; 5	AUS	ITA	CIV	ESP	GBR; Ret	31st	8
1992	Nissan Motorsports Europe	Nissan Sunny GTI-R	MON; 9	SWE	POR; Ret	KEN	FRA	GRC	NZL	ARG	FIN; Ret	AUS	ITA	CIV	ESP	GBR; 8	40th	5
1993	Astra	Lancia Delta HF Integrale	MON	SWE; 4	POR	KEN	FRA	GRE; 6	ARG	NZL	FIN; 4	AUS	ITA	ESP	GBR		10th	26
1994	Nissan F2	Nissan Sunny GTI	MON	POR; Ret	KEN	FRA	GRE	ARG	NZL			GBR; 9					10th	22
1994	Ford Motorsport	Ford Escort RS Cosworth								FIN; 1							10th	22
1994	Mitsubishi Ralliart	Mitsubishi Lancer Evo II									ITA; Ret						10th	22
1995	Mitsubishi Ralliart	Mitsubishi Lancer Evo II	MON; 4	SWE; 2													5th	38
1995	Mitsubishi Ralliart	Mitsubishi Lancer Evo III			POR	FRA; 8	NZL; Ret	AUS; 4	ESP; Ret	GBR; Ret							5th	38
1996	Mitsubishi Ralliart	Mitsubishi Lancer Evo III	SWE; 1	KEN; 1	IDN; Ret	GRE; 2	ARG; 1	FIN; 1	AUS; 1	ITA; Ret	ESP; 5						1st	123
1997	Mitsubishi Ralliart	Mitsubishi Lancer Evo IV	MON; 3	SWE; 3	KEN; Ret	POR; 1	ESP; 1	FRA; Ret	ARG; 1	GRE; 3	NZL; Ret	FIN; 1	IDN; Ret	ITA; 3	AUS; 2	GBR; 6	1st	63
1998	Mitsubishi Ralliart	Mitsubishi Lancer Evo IV	MON; Ret	SWE; 1	KEN; Ret	POR; Ret											1st	58
1998	Mitsubishi Ralliart	Mitsubishi Lancer Evo V					ESP; 3	FRA; Ret	ARG; 1	GRE; Ret	NZL; 3	FIN; 1	ITA; 1	AUS; 1	GBR; Ret		1st	58
1999	Marlboro Mitsubishi Ralliart	Mitsubishi Lancer Evo VI	MON; 1	SWE; 1	KEN; DSQ	POR; 5	ESP; 3	FRA; 6	ARG; 4	GRE; 3	NZL; 1	FIN; Ret	CHN; Ret	ITA; 1	AUS; 3	GBR; Ret	1st	62
2000	Marlboro Mitsubishi Ralliart	Mitsubishi Lancer Evo VI	MON; 1	SWE; 2	KEN; Ret	POR; Ret	ESP; 4	ARG; 3	GRE; Ret	NZL; Ret	FIN; 4	CYP; 5	FRA; Ret	ITA; 3	AUS; DSQ	GBR; 3	5th	36
2001	Marlboro Mitsubishi Ralliart	Mitsubishi Lancer Evo 6.5	MON; 1	SWE; Ret	POR; 1	ESP; 3	ARG; 4	CYP; Ret	GRE; 4	KEN; 1	FIN; Ret	NZL; 8					3rd	41
2001	Marlboro Mitsubishi Ralliart	Mitsubishi Lancer Evo VII WRC											ITA; Ret	FRA; Ret	AUS; 6	GBR; Ret	3rd	41
2002	555 Subaru World Rally Team	Subaru Impreza WRC2001	MON; 1	SWE; Ret													8th	22
2002	555 Subaru World Rally Team	Subaru Impreza WRC2002			FRA; Ret	ESP; Ret	CYP; 3	ARG; Ret	GRE; Ret	KEN; Ret	FIN; 6	GER; 7	ITA; Ret	NZL; 3	AUS; DSQ	GBR; 4	8th	22
2003	555 Subaru World Rally Team	Subaru Impreza WRC2003	MON; Ret	SWE; 2	TUR; 8	NZL; 7	ARG; Ret	GRE; 5	CYP; Ret	GER; Ret	FIN; 6	AUS; 6	ITA; 10	FRA; 7	ESP; 8	GBR; 3	8th	30

=== WRC summary ===
Season	Team	Starts	Victories	Podiums	Stage wins	DNF	Points	Final result
1987	Private	1	0	0	0	1	0	NC
1988	Private	1	0	0	0	1	0	NC
1988	Mu-Uutiset 4 Rombi Corse	1	0	0	0	1	0	NC
1989	Private	2	0	0	0	2	0	NC
1990	Pro Sport Rally Team	5	0	0	0	1	10	24th
1991	Promoracing Finland	2	0	0	0	1	0	31st
1991	Mazda Rally Team Europe	2	0	0	0	1	8	31st
1991	Private	1	0	0	0	1	0	31st
1992	Nissan Motorsports Europe	4	0	0	1	2	5	40th
1993	Astra	3	0	0	3	0	26	10th
1994	Nissan F2	2	0	0	0	1	2	10th
1994	Ford Motor Co	1	1	1	14	0	20	10th
1994	Mitsubishi Ralliart	1	0	0	0	1	0	10th
1995	Mitsubishi Ralliart	7	0	1	24	3	38	5th
1996	Mitsubishi Ralliart	9	5	6	70	2	123	1st
1997	Mitsubishi Ralliart	14	4	9	78	4	63	1st
1998	Mitsubishi Ralliart	13	5	7	41	6	58	1st
1999	Marlboro Mitsubishi Ralliart	14	4	7	56	3	62	1st
2000	Marlboro Mitsubishi Ralliart	14	1	5	27	5	36	5th
2001	Marlboro Mitsubishi Ralliart	14	3	4	21	6	41	3rd
2002	555 Subaru World Rally Team	14	1	3	16	7	22	8th
2003	555 Subaru World Rally Team	14	0	2	10	4	30	8th
Total		139	24	45	361	53	544	

== See also ==
- International Rally Championship

Awards and achievements
Preceded by Colin McRae	Autosport; International Rally Driver Award; 1996, 1997 (shared with Colin McRae), 1998, 1999	Succeeded by Richard Burns
Sporting positions
Preceded by Colin McRae	World Rally Champion; 1996, 1997, 1998, 1999	Succeeded by Marcus Grönholm
Preceded by Inaugural event	Race of Champions; Nations' Cup; 1999 with: JJ Lehto; Kari Tiainen	Succeeded by Régis Laconi; Yvan Muller; Gilles Panizzi
Preceded by Didier Auriol	Race of Champions; Champion of Champions; 2000	Succeeded by Harri Rovanperä
Records
Preceded by Juha Kankkunen; 23 wins (1979, 1982–2002, 2010)	Most rally wins 24 wins, 24th at the 2002 Monte Carlo Rally	Succeeded by Colin McRae; 25 wins, 25th at the 2002 Safari Rally
