= 1992 Monte Carlo Rally =

Rallying motorsport event

1992 Monte Carlo Rally 60ème Rallye Automobile de Monte-Carlo
Round 1 of the 1992 World Rally Championship
Next event →
- Host country: Monaco
- Dates run: 23 – 29 January 1992
- Stages: 26
- Stage surface: Asphalt/Snow
- Overall distance: 628.29 km (390.40 miles)

Statistics
- Crews: 141 at start, 76 at finish

Overall results
- Overall winner: (France) Didier Auriol; Lancia Delta HF Integrale; 6:54:20

The 1992 Monte Carlo Rally was the 60th Rallye Automobile de Monte-Carlo. It was won by Didier Auriol.

It was part of the 1992 World Rally Championship.

== Results ==
Pos.	No.	Driver	Car	Time/Retired	Pts.
1	3	(France) Didier Auriol	Lancia Delta HF Integrale	6:54:20	20
2	6	(Spain) Carlos Sainz	Toyota Celica Turbo 4WD (ST185)	6:56:25	15
3	2	(Finland) Juha Kankkunen	Lancia Delta HF Integrale	6:57:17	12
4	8	(France) François Delecour	Ford Sierra RS Cosworth 4x4	6:59:02	10
5	7	(France) Philippe Bugalski	Lancia Delta HF Integrale	7:04:32	8
6	4	(Finland) Timo Salonen	Mitsubishi Galant VR-4	7:05:21	6
7	15	(France) François Chatriot	Nissan Sunny GTI-R	7:10:47	4
8	10	(Italy) Miki Biasion	Ford Sierra RS Cosworth 4x4	7:11:18	3
9	16	(Finland) Tommi Mäkinen	Nissan Sunny GTI-R	7:12:58	2
10	29	(Monaco) Christophe Spiliotis	Ford Sierra RS Cosworth 4x4	7:42:41	1
