= Didier Auriol =

French rally driver (born 1958)

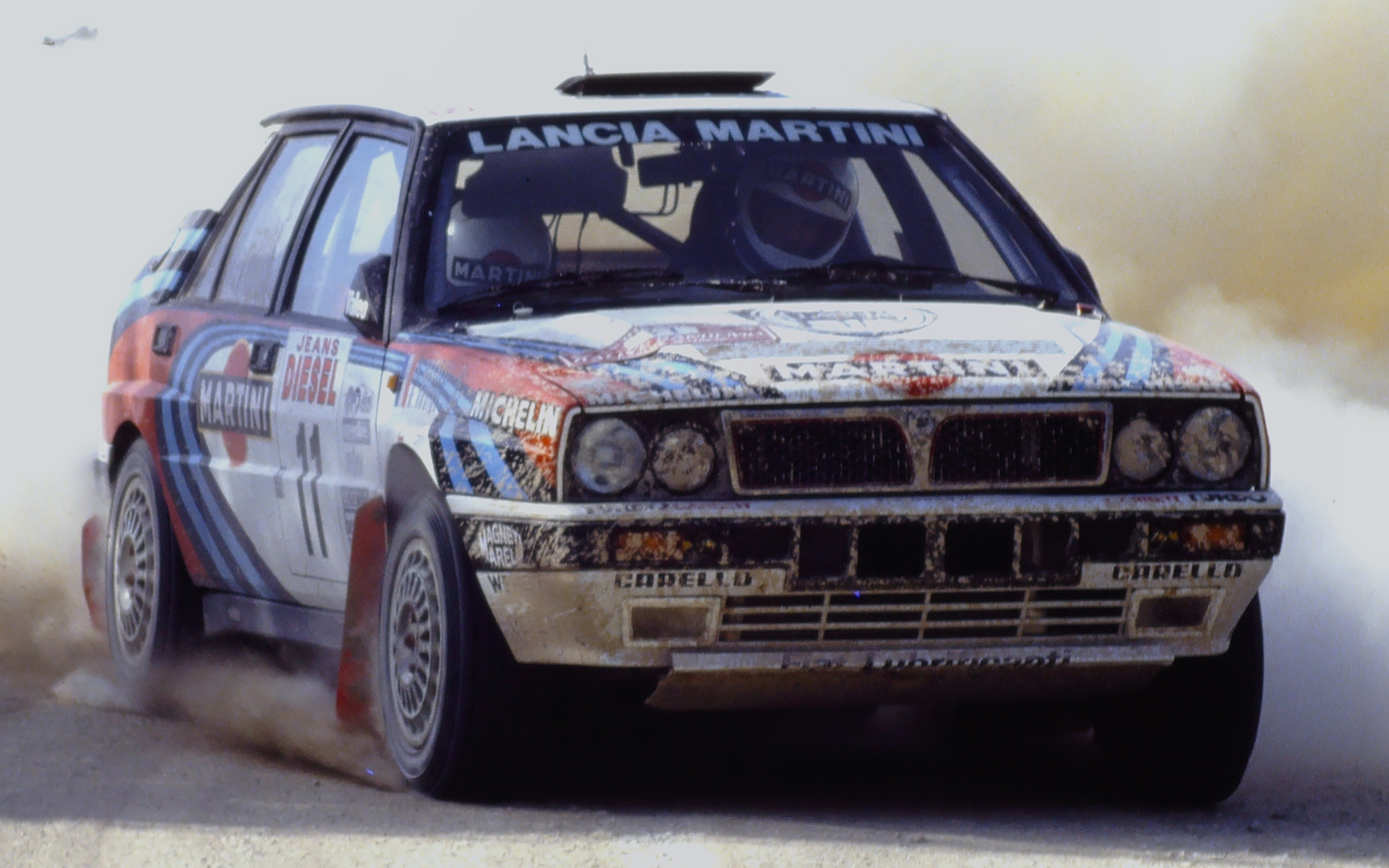
- Auriol and co-driver Bernard Occelli on Lancia Delta Integrale 16V at the 1990 Rallye Sanremo, closed in 1st place overall.

Personal information
- Nationality: (France) French
- Born: 18 August 1958 (age 68); Montpellier, France

World Rally Championship record
- Years active: 1984–2003, 2005
- Co-driver: (France) Bernard Occelli (France) Denis Giraudet (France) Jean-Marc Andrié (France) Jack Boyère
- Teams: Austin Rover, Ford, Lancia, Toyota, Subaru, Mitsubishi, SEAT, Peugeot, Škoda
- Rallies: 152
- Championships: 1 (1994)
- Rally wins: 20
- Podiums: 53
- Stage wins: 554
- Total points: 747
- First rally: 1984 Tour de Corse
- First win: 1988 Tour de Corse
- Last win: 2001 Rally Catalunya
- Last rally: 2005 Monte Carlo Rally

Didier Auriol (born 18 August 1958) is a French former rally driver. Born in Montpellier and initially an ambulance driver, he competed in the World Rally Championship throughout the 1990s. He became World Rally Champion in 1994, the first driver from his country to do so. He was a factory candidate for Lancia, Toyota and Peugeot among others, before losing his seat at Škoda at the end of 2003. His sister Nadine was also involved in rallying as a co-driver, while his brother Gerrard was also a former rally driver.

== Career ==
At the age of 21, Auriol started rallying in an old Simca 1000. He drove the Simca for two years before getting a Renault 5 Turbo to compete in the French Rally Championship. In 1986 he competed in a Metro 6R4. With this car, he won his first French Rallye Championship. He contested it again the following year, the first of the Group A years, in a Ford Sierra RS Cosworth and with his car he was French Rally Champion 1987 and 1988.

Auriol won his first World Championship event, the 1988 Tour de Corse, whilst driving a works Ford Sierra RS Cosworth. It was the only time that season when Lancia were beaten in a straight fight, and the Lancia team signed him for the following year. He remained with the team for four seasons, driving three successive versions of the then-dominant Lancia Delta Integrale. In 1992, driving the final evolution of the car, he won six events in one season (a record until beaten by Sébastien Loeb in 2005), but poor results on other rounds and retirement on the last event of the season, the RAC Rally, handed the world championship to Carlos Sainz.

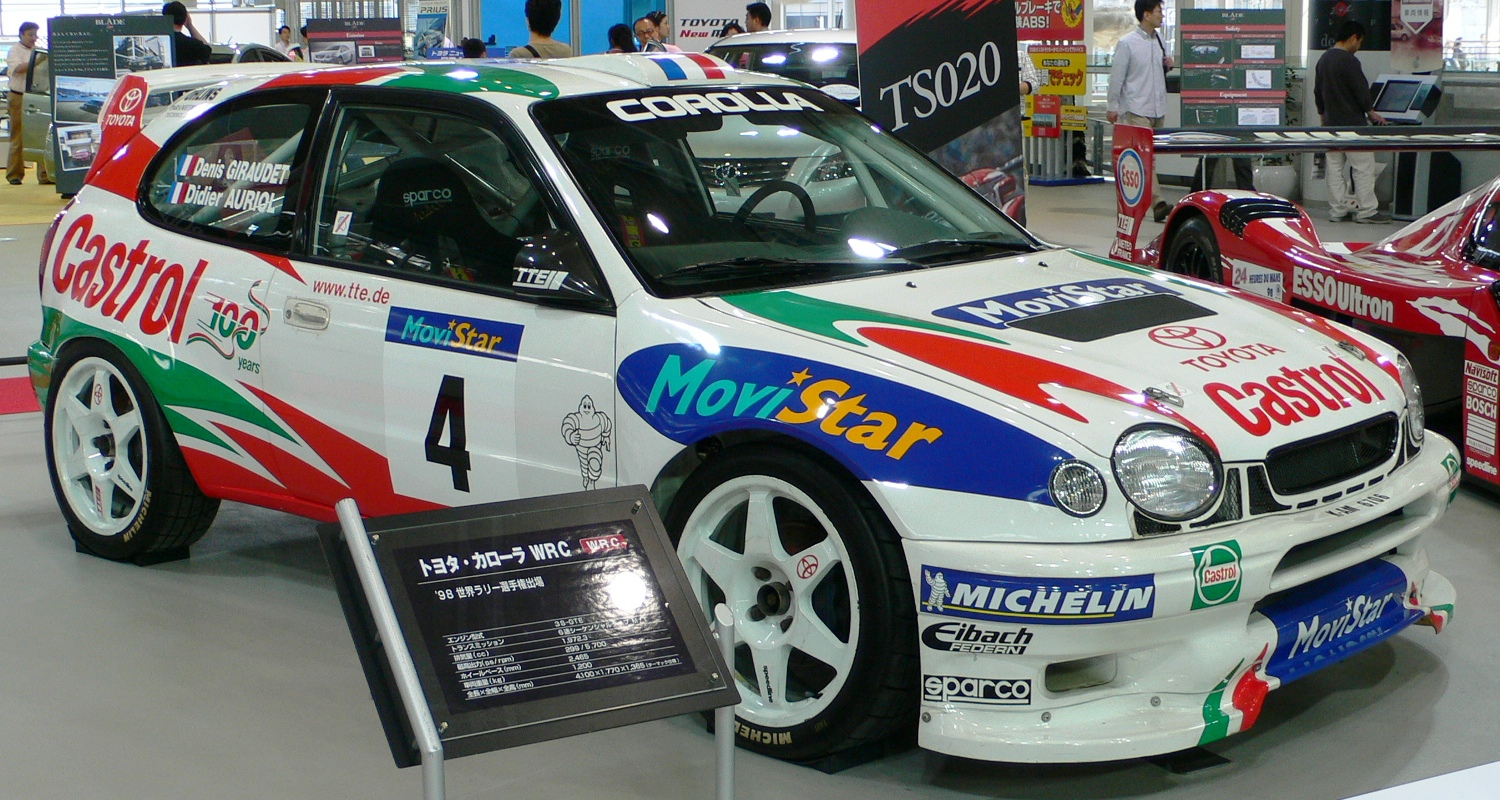
Auriol's Toyota Corolla WRC on display.

In 1993, Auriol switched to Toyota, and won his first event for the team, the Monte Carlo Rally. He did not win again that season, but the following year he won the Corsica, Argentina and San Remo rallies and went into the final round, in Great Britain, vying again with Sainz for the championship. Despite a poor showing on the rally, he emerged as World Champion after the Spanish driver went off the road on the final day. In 1995, he took the first win for the Celica GT-Four ST205 in Tour de Corse with Denis Giraudet, who replaced his regular co-driver Bernard Occelli who was experiencing a family problem at that time. However, later in the same season, on the Rally Catalunya, Toyota were found to have used an illegal device in the turbocharger to increase the power of the engine, and were excluded from the results of the 1995 championship and banned for next year.

In 1996, Auriol contested only two World Championship events. He drove for Subaru in Sweden and for Mitsubishi in San Remo. In 1997, he entered in Monte Carlo with a private Ford, and drove couple of rallies with Toyota's new Corolla WRC.

In 1998, Auriol became a Toyota full-time driver. he earned one win and four podiums, finishing fifth in the overall standings. In 1999 he scored one win and seven podiums, which placed him third in points.

As Toyota retired from World Rally Championship after 1999, Auriol moved to SEAT Sport, driving the SEAT Córdoba WRC E2. Using Auriol's experience, SEAT managed to grab the third podium place at the Safari Rally in Kenya, and later that season to launch their third evolution of the Córdoba WRC. However at the end of the season the Spanish manufacturer retired from WRC to focus on the development of a special series of high performance cars.

Auriol landed a drive with Peugeot Sport for the 2001 season, but he had a largely difficult season; only on asphalt-rallies was Auriol able to be quicker than his teammate, Marcus Grönholm. Auriol's only win that year came in Spain, whereas he scored three third places at Sanremo, Corse and Australia. 2002 was a kind of gap year for Auriol, and for 2003, Auriol signed with Škoda Motorsport, and played a notable part in the development work of the Škoda Fabia WRC.

Auriol is a six-time winner of the Tour de Corse, a record jointly held with Bernard Darniche.

== WRC victories ==
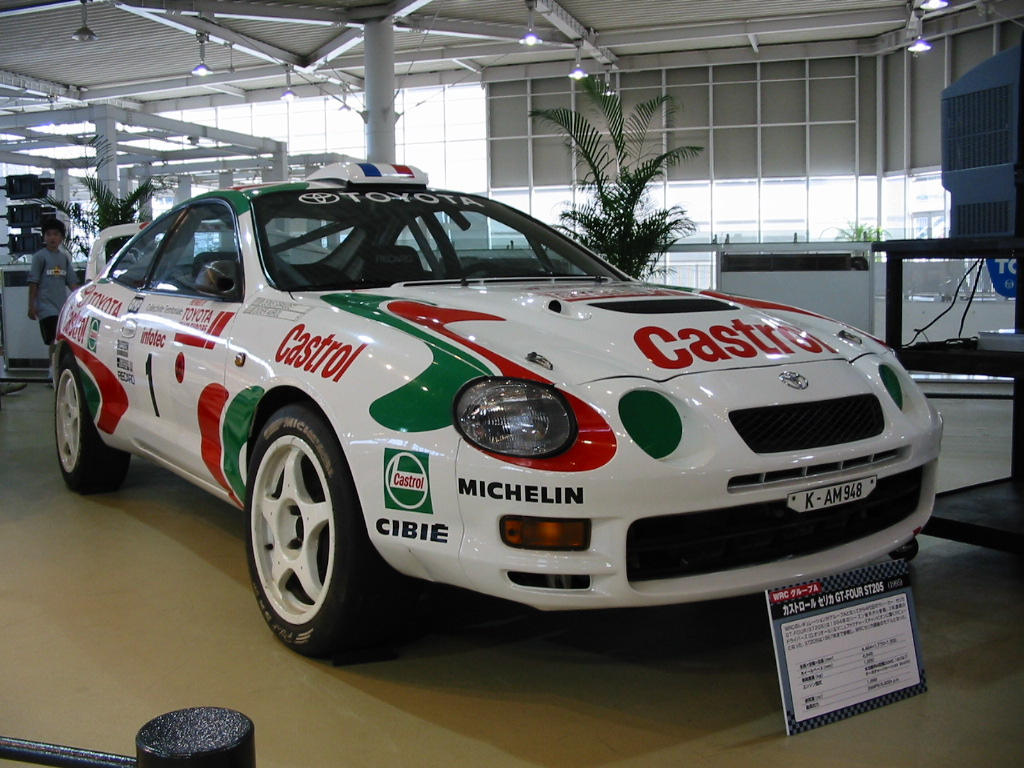
Auriol's Toyota Celica GT-Four 1995 Tour de Corse winning car.

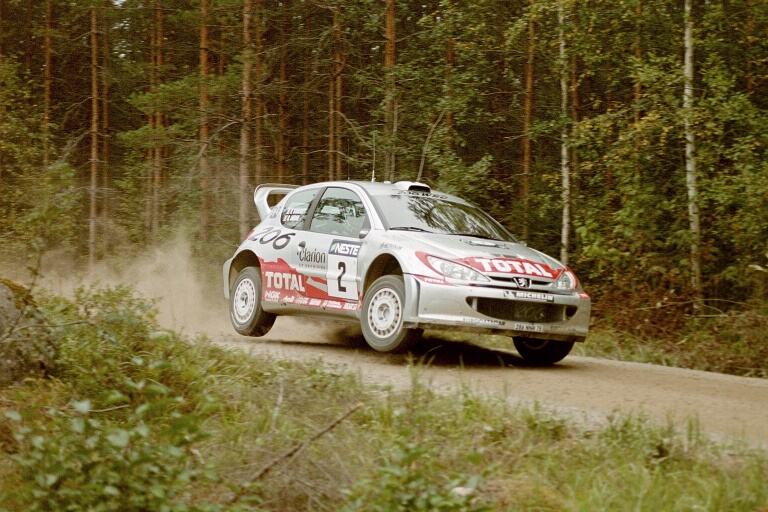
Auriol with a Peugeot 206 WRC at the 2001 Rally Finland.

Number	Event	Season	Co-driver	Car
1	32ème Tour de Corse – Rallye de France	1988	Bernard Occelli	Ford Sierra RS Cosworth
2	33ème Tour de Corse – Rallye de France	1989	Bernard Occelli	Lancia Delta Integrale
3	(Monaco) 58ème Rallye Automobile de Monte-Carlo	1990	Bernard Occelli	Lancia Delta Integrale 16V
4	34ème Tour de Corse – Rallye de France	1990	Bernard Occelli	Lancia Delta Integrale 16V
5	(Italy) 32º Rallye Sanremo – Rallye d'Italia	1990	Bernard Occelli	Lancia Delta Integrale 16V
6	(Italy) 33º Rallye Sanremo – Rallye d'Italia	1991	Bernard Occelli	Lancia Delta Integrale 16V
7	(Monaco) 60ème Rallye Automobile de Monte-Carlo	1992	Bernard Occelli	Lancia Delta HF Integrale
8	36ème Tour de Corse – Rallye de France	1992	Bernard Occelli	Lancia Delta HF Integrale
9	(Greece) 39th Acropolis Rally	1992	Bernard Occelli	Lancia Delta HF Integrale
10	12º Rally Argentina	1992	Bernard Occelli	Lancia Delta HF Integrale
11	(Finland) 42nd 1000 Lakes Rally	1992	Bernard Occelli	Lancia Delta HF Integrale
12	5th Telecom Rally Australia	1992	Bernard Occelli	Lancia Delta HF Integrale
13	(Monaco) 61ème Rallye Automobile de Monte-Carlo	1993	Bernard Occelli	Toyota Celica Turbo 4WD
14	38ème Tour de Corse – Rallye de France	1994	Bernard Occelli	Toyota Celica Turbo 4WD
15	14º Rally Argentina	1994	Bernard Occelli	Toyota Celica Turbo 4WD
16	(Italy) 36º Rallye Sanremo – Rallye d'Italia	1994	Bernard Occelli	Toyota Celica Turbo 4WD
17	39ème Tour de Corse – Rallye de France	1995	Denis Giraudet	Toyota Celica GT-Four ST205
18	(Spain) 34º Rallye Catalunya-Costa Brava (Rallye de España)	1998	Denis Giraudet	Toyota Corolla WRC
19	3rd China Rally	1999	Denis Giraudet	Toyota Corolla WRC
20	(Spain) 37º Rallye Catalunya-Costa Brava (Rallye de España)	2001	Denis Giraudet	Peugeot 206 WRC

== WRC results ==
Year	Entrant	Car	1	2	3	4	5	6	7	8	9	10	11	12	13	14	15	16	WDC	Points
1984	Didier Auriol	Renault 5 Turbo	MON	SWE	POR	KEN	FRA; Ret	GRC	NZL	ARG	FIN	ITA	CIV	GBR					–	0
1985	Didier Auriol	Renault 5 Maxi Turbo	MON	SWE	POR	KEN	FRA; Ret	GRC	NZL	ARG	FIN	ITA	CIV	GBR					–	0
1986	Austin Rover World Championship Team	MG Metro 6R4	MON	SWE	POR	KEN	FRA; Ret	GRC	NZL	ARG	FIN	CIV	ITA	GBR	USA				–	0
1987	Ford France	Ford Sierra RS Cosworth	MON	SWE	POR	KEN	FRA; 8	GRC	USA	NZL	ARG	FIN	CIV	ITA; 4	GBR				22nd	13
1988	Ford France	Ford Sierra RS Cosworth	MON	SWE	POR; Ret	KEN													7th	32
1988	Ford Motorsport	Ford Sierra RS Cosworth					FRA; 1	GRC	USA	NZL	ARG	FIN; 3	CIV	ITA; Ret	GBR				7th	32
1989	Martini Lancia	Lancia Delta Integrale	SWE	MON; 2	POR; Ret	KEN	FRA; 1	GRC; 2	NZL	ARG	FIN; Ret	AUS							5th	50
1989	Martini Lancia	Lancia Delta Integrale 16v											ITA; Ret	CIV	GBR				5th	50
1990	Martini Lancia	Lancia Delta HF Integrale 16v	MON; 1	POR; 2	KEN	FRA; 1	GRC; Ret	NZL	ARG; 3	FIN; Ret	AUS; Ret	ITA; 1	CIV	GBR; 5					2nd	95
1991	Jolly Club	Lancia Delta HF Integrale 16v	MON; Ret	SWE; 9	POR; 2	KEN	FRA; 2	GRC; 4	NZL; 3	ARG; 3	FIN; 2	AUS; Ret	ITA; 1	CIV	ESP	GBR; 12			3rd	101
1992	Martini Lancia	Lancia Delta HF Integrale	MON; 1	SWE	POR; Ret	KEN	FRA; 1	GRC; 1	NZL	ARG; 1	FIN; 1	AUS; 1	ITA; Ret	CIV	ESP; 10	GBR; Ret			3rd	121
1993	Castrol Toyota Team Europe	Toyota Celica Turbo 4WD	MON; 1	SWE; Ret	POR	KEN	FRA; 2	GRC; Ret	ARG; 3	NZL; 3	FIN; 3	AUS; Ret	ITA	ESP; 2	GBR; 6				3rd	92
1994	Castrol Toyota Team Europe	Toyota Celica Turbo 4WD	MON; Ret	POR; 2	KEN; 3	FRA; 1	GRC; Ret	ARG; 1	NZL; 5	FIN; 2	ITA; 1	GBR; 6							1st	116
1995	Castrol Toyota Team Europe	Toyota Celica GT-Four ST205	MON; Ret	SWE; 5	POR; 5	FRA; 1	NZL; 2	AUS; Ret	ESP; DSQ	GBR									DSQ	51
1996	555 Subaru World Rally Team	Subaru Impreza 555	SWE; 10	KEN	IDN	GRC	ARG	FIN	AUS										25th	4
1996	Team Mitsubishi Ralliart	Mitsubishi Lancer Evo III								ITA; 8	ESP								25th	4
1997	R.A.S. Sport	Ford Escort RS Cosworth	MON; Ret	SWE	KEN	POR	ESP	FRA											11th	6
1997	H.F. Grifone	Toyota Celica GT-Four ST205							ARG; 5	GRC	NZL								11th	6
1997	Castrol Toyota Team Europe	Toyota Corolla WRC										FIN; 8	IDN; Ret	ITA; 8	AUS; 3	GBR; Ret			11th	6
1998	Castrol Toyota Team Europe	Toyota Corolla WRC	MON; 14	SWE; 6	KEN; 4	POR; Ret	ESP; 1	FRA; 6	ARG; Ret	GRC; 2	NZL; 2	FIN; 4	ITA; Ret	AUS; 3	GBR; Ret				5th	34
1999	Castrol Toyota Team Europe	Toyota Corolla WRC	MON; 3	SWE; 4	KEN; 2	POR; 3	ESP; 2	FRA; 5	ARG; 3	GRC; Ret	NZL; 4	FIN; Ret	CHN; 1	ITA; 3	AUS; Ret	GBR; Ret			3rd	52
2000	Repsol SEAT Sport	SEAT Córdoba WRC Evo2	MON; Ret	SWE; 10	KEN; 3	POR; 10	ESP; 13	ARG; Ret	GRC; Ret	NZL; Ret									12th	4
2000	Repsol SEAT Sport	SEAT Córdoba WRC Evo3									FIN; 11	CYP; Ret	FRA; 8	ITA; 17	AUS; 8	GBR; 9			12th	4
2001	Peugeot Sport Total	Peugeot 206 WRC	MON; Ret	SWE; Ret	POR; 8	ESP; 1	ARG; Ret	CYP; Ret	GRC; Ret	KEN; Ret	FIN; Ret	NZL; 6	ITA; 3	FRA; 3	AUS; 3	GBR; 7			7th	23
2002	Didier Auriol	Toyota Corolla WRC	MON; Ret	SWE	FRA	ESP	CYP	ARG	GRE	KEN	FIN	GER	ITA	NZL	AUS	GBR			–	0
2003	Shell Škoda Motorsport	Škoda Octavia WRC Evo3	MON; 9	SWE; 18	TUR; Ret	NZL; 8	ARG; 6	GRE; 9	CYP; Ret										13th	4
2003	Shell Škoda Motorsport	Škoda Fabia WRC								GER; Ret	FIN; Ret	AUS; 12	ITA; 12	FRA; Ret	ESP; Ret	GBR; 11			13th	4
2005	Didier Auriol	Peugeot 206 WRC	MON; Ret	SWE	MEX	NZL	ITA	CYP	TUR	GRE	ARG	FIN	GER	GBR	JPN	FRA	ESP	AUS	–	0

Awards and achievements
Preceded by Carlos Sainz	Autosport; International Rally Driver Award; 1992	Succeeded by Juha Kankkunen
Sporting positions
Preceded by Andrea Aghini	Race of Champions; Champion of Champions; 1993–1994	Succeeded by François Delecour
Preceded by Juha Kankkunen	World Rally Champion; 1994	Succeeded by Colin McRae
Preceded by François Delecour	Race of Champions; Champion of Champions; 1996	Succeeded by Carlos Sainz
Preceded by Colin McRae	Race of Champions; Champion of Champions; 1999	Succeeded by Tommi Mäkinen
