= French Elite Motocross Championship =

French Motocross Competition

- French Elite Motocross Championship logo
- Category: Motocross
- Country: France
- Inaugural season: 1950

The French Elite Motocross Championship (French: Championnat de France Motocross) is the premier domestic French Motocross series, sanctioned by the Fédération Française de Motocyclisme.

Due to sponsorship reason, the series has been known as the 24MX Tour since 2016. The premier classes are the Elite MX1 and Elite MX2 but there are also classes for younger riders.

== History ==
The French Elite Motocross Championship has existed as the highest level of domestic motocross in France since 1949. Yves Demaria holds the highest number of senior titles with 10. The classes within the championship have evolved over time in line with what has been seen in the sport around the world.

== Event Format ==
Rounds of the French Elite Motocross Championship typically have a single day format. Qualifying takes place in a morning in the form of timed practice sessions, with the two points paying races taking place in the afternoon. If a class has more than 40 entries, the timed practice sessions are split into two groups.

Points are awarded to finishers of the main races, in the following format:

Position	1st	2nd	3rd	4th	5th	6th	7th	8th	9th	10th	11th	12th	13th	14th	15th	16th	17th	18th	19th	20th
Points	25	22	20	18	16	15	14	13	12	11	10	9	8	7	6	5	4	3	2	1

== List of Champions ==
Season	Elite MX1 Champion	Elite MX2 Champion	Juniors (125cc) Champion	Espoirs (85cc) Champion
2026	(France) Maxime Desprey (Yamaha)	(Spain) Francisco García (Kawasaki)	(France) Arno Cazet (Yamaha)	(France) Tim Lopes (Kawasaki)
2025	(Norway) Kevin Horgmo (Honda)	(France) Mathys Boisramé (KTM)	(France) Matéo Bernard (Yamaha)	(France) Rafaël Mennillo (KTM)
2024	(France) Maxime Desprey (Yamaha)	(France) Mathis Valin (Kawasaki)	(France) Tom Brunet (KTM)	(France) Leo Diss-Fenard (KTM)
2023	(Switzerland) Valentin Guillod (Honda)	(France) Pierre Goupillon (KTM)	(France) Mathis Valin (Gas Gas)	(Switzerland) Ryan Oppliger (KTM)
2022	(France) Milko Potisek (Yamaha)	(France) Pierre Goupillon (KTM)	(France) Adrien Petit (Yamaha)	(France) Mano Faure (Husqvarna)
2021	(France) Maxime Desprey (Yamaha)	(France) Pierre Goupillon (KTM)	(Belgium) Lucas Coenen (KTM)	(France) Mathis Valin (Gas Gas)
2020	(Belgium) Jeremy Van Horebeek (Honda)	(France) Anthony Bourdon (Husqvarna)	(France) Quentin Prugnières (KTM)	(Belgium) Sacha Coenen (KTM)
2019	(France) Maxime Desprey (Honda)	(France) Stephen Rubini (Honda)	(France) Florian Miot (Yamaha)	(France) Quentin Prugnières (KTM)
2018	(France) Xavier Boog (Honda)	(France) Mathys Boisramé (Honda)	(France) Tom Guyon (KTM)	(Switzerland) Luca Diserens (KTM)
2017	(France) Xavier Boog (Honda)	(France) Florent Richier (Suzuki)	(France) Thibault Benistant (Yamaha)	(France) Pablo Metayer (KTM)
2016	(France) Gregory Aranda (Yamaha)	(France) Mathys Boisramé (Yamaha)	(France) Stephen Rubini (KTM)	(France) Tom Guyon (TM)
2015	(France) Xavier Boog (KTM)	(France) Maxime Desprey (Kawasaki)	(France) Maxime Renaux (Yamaha)	(France) Brian Moreau (Kawasaki)
2014	(France) Sébastien Pourcel (KTM)	(Belgium) Damon Graulus (KTM)	(France) David Herbreteau (Yamaha)	(France) Calvin Fonvieille (KTM)
				Cadet (85cc) Champion
2013	(France) Cédric Soubeyras (Honda)	(France) Dylan Ferrandis (Kawasaki)	(France) Nicolas Dercourt (Yamaha)	(France) Bastien Guillaume (KTM)
2012	(France) Sébastien Pourcel (Kawasaki)	(France) Valentin Teillet (Kawasaki)	(France) Paul Stauder (KTM)	(France) David Herbreteau (Kawasaki)
2011	(France) Xavier Boog (Kawasaki)	(France) Nicolas Aubin (KTM)	(France) Simon Mallet (Yamaha)	(France) Thomas Do (KTM)
2010	(France) Xavier Boog (Kawasaki)	(France) Steven Frossard (Kawasaki)	(France) Jordi Tixier (KTM)	(France) Nicolas Dercourt (Yamaha)
2009	(France) David Vuillemin (Kawasaki)	(France) Marvin Musquin (Honda)	(France) Richard Fura (Yamaha)	(France) Maxime Desprey (Yamaha)
2008	(France) Sébastien Pourcel (Kawasaki)	(France) Steven Frossard (Kawasaki)	(France) Mathias Bellino (Yamaha)	(France) Dylan Ferrandis (Yamaha)
2007	(France) Sébastien Pourcel (Kawasaki)	(France) Nicolas Aubin (Yamaha)	(France) Cédric Soubeyras (Yamaha)	(France) Jason Clermont (Honda)
2006	(France) Pascal Leuret (Honda)	(France) Sébastien Pourcel (Kawasaki)	(France) Khounsith Vongsana (KTM)	(France) Loïc Larrieu (KTM)
	Open Elite Champion	125cc Elite Champion	125cc Junior Champion	85cc Cadet Champion
2005	(France) Mickaël Pichon (Honda)	(France) Christophe Pourcel (Kawasaki)	(France) Steven Frossard (KTM)	(France) Marvin Musquin (Kawasaki)
2004	(France) Mickaël Pichon (Honda)	(France) Sébastien Pourcel (Kawasaki)	(France) Nicolas Aubin (KTM)	(France) Gregory Aranda (Kawasaki)
				80cc Cadet Champion
2003	(France) Thierry Bethys (Honda)	(France) Mickaël Maschio (Kawasaki)	(France) Anthony Boissière (Kawasaki)	(France) Christophe Pourcel (Kawasaki)
2002	(France) Mickaël Pichon (Suzuki)	(France) Mickaël Maschio (Kawasaki)	(France) Jérémy Tarroux (Suzuki)	(France) Christophe Pourcel (Kawasaki)
2001	(France) Yves Demaria (Yamaha)	(France) Luigi Seguy (Yamaha)	(France) Sébastien Pourcel (Kawasaki)	(France) Christophe Pourcel (Kawasaki)
2000	(France) Yves Demaria (Yamaha)	(France) Luigi Seguy (Yamaha)	(France) Christophe Martin (Husqvarna)	(France) Thomas Allier (Honda)
1999	(France) David Vuillemin (Yamaha)	(France) Johnny Aubert (Husqvarna)	(France) Pascal Leuret (Honda)	(France) Benjamin Coisy (Yamaha)
1998	(France) Thierry Bethys (Honda)	(France) David Vuillemin (Yamaha)	(France) Steve Boniface (Honda)	(France) Nicolas Delepierre (Kawasaki)
1997	(France) Nicolas Cailly (Yamaha)	(France) Frédéric Vialle (Yamaha)	(France) Eric Sorby (Kawasaki)	(France) Steve Boniface (Honda)
1996	(France) Yves Demaria (Yamaha)	(France) Sébastien Tortelli (Kawasaki)	(France) Johnny Aubert (KTM)	(France) Steve Boniface (Honda)
1995	(France) Yves Demaria (Yamaha)	(France) Sébastien Tortelli (Kawasaki)	(France) Sébastien Trottier (Honda)	(France) Eric Sorby (Yamaha)
1994	(France) Yves Demaria (Honda)	(France) Mickaël Pichon (Honda)	(France) Stéphane Roncada (Honda)	(France) Mathieu Lafaix (Kawasaki)
1993	(France) Frédéric Bolley (Yamaha)	(France) Yves Demaria (Suzuki)	(France) Sébastien Carrico (Kawasaki)	(France) Johnny Aubert (Yamaha)
1992	(France) Yann Guédard (Kawasaki)	(France) Yves Demaria (Suzuki)	(France) Jean-Roch Peres (Suzuki)	(France) Sébastien Tortelli (Kawasaki)
1991	(France) Yannig Kervella (Kawasaki)	(France) Yves Demaria (Suzuki)	(France) Mickaël Pichon (Honda)	(France) Luigi Seguy (Kawasaki)
	Open Inter Champion	125cc Inter Champion		
1990	(France) Yannig Kervella (Kawasaki)	(France) Yves Demaria (Yamaha)	(France) Cyril Porte (Honda)	(France) Jean-Roch Peres (Kawasaki)
1989	(France) Jacky Vimond (Honda)	(France) Yves Demaria (Yamaha)	(France) Fabien Guene (Honda)	(France) Mickaël Pichon (Honda)
1988	(France) Jacky Vimond (Yamaha)	(France) Jean-Michel Bayle (Honda)	(France) Thierry Bethys (Honda)	(France) Mickaël Pichon (Honda)
1987	(France) Christian Vimond (Honda)	(France) Jean-Michel Bayle (Honda)	(France) Yves Demaria (Yamaha)	(France) Frédéric Bolley (Honda)
1986	(France) Yves Gervaise (KTM)	(France) Patrick Perrier (Honda)	(France) Thierry Noizier (Kawasaki)	(France) Yves Demaria (Yamaha)

=== Pre-1986 ===
Season	500cc Inter Champion	250cc Inter Champion	125cc Inter Champion	125cc Junior Champion	80cc Cadet Champion
1985	(France) Jean-Jacques Bruno (Suzuki)	(France) Jacky Vimond (Yamaha)	(France) Christian Vimond (Honda)	(France) Patrick Demaria (Yamaha)	(France) Jérôme Belval (Kawasaki)
1984	(Belgium) Jean-Paul Mingels (Yamaha)	(France) Jacky Vimond (Yamaha)	(France) Jean-Luc Fouchet (Yamaha)	(France) Philippe Gay (KTM)	-
1983	(France) Patrick Fura (Yamaha)	(France) Yannig Kervella (KTM)	(France) Patrick Perrier (Yamaha)	(France) Thierry Lassaigne (KTM)	-
1982	(France) Patrick Boniface (Honda)	(France) Jacky Vimond (Yamaha)	(France) Yannig Kervella (KTM)	(France) Dominique Vulliez (Yamaha)	-
1981	(France) Jean-Jacques Bruno (Suzuki)	(France) Patrick Fura (Husqvarna)	(France) Jacky Vimond (Yamaha)	(France) Olivier Robert (Aprilia)	-
1980	(France) Jean-Jacques Bruno (Suzuki)	(France) Jean-Michel Baron (Portal)	(France) Jacky Vimond (Yamaha)	(France) Yves Gervaise (Yamaha)	-
1979	(France) Jean-Jacques Bruno (KTM)	(France) Patrick Boniface (Honda)	(France) Jacky Vimond (Yamaha)	(France) Vincent Chastanet (KTM)	-
1978	(France) Jean-Jacques Bruno (KTM)	(France) Daniel Péan (Maico)	(France) Patrick Gervaise (Yamaha)	(France) Jacky Vimond (Suzuki)	-
1977	(France) Serge Bacou (Bultaco)	(France) Jean-Jacques Bruno (KTM)	(France) Patrick Boniface (KTM)	(France) Patrick Gervaise (KTM)	-
1976	(France) Serge Bacou (Bultaco)	(France) Daniel Péan (Maico)	(France) Jean-Paul Hypolite (Kawasaki)	(France) Patrick Boniface (KTM)	-
1975	(France) Michel Combes (Montesa)	(France) Daniel Péan (Maico)	(France) Jean-Paul Hypolite (Kawasaki)	(France) Denis Vimond (Honda)	-
				250cc Junior Champion	
1974	(France) Serge Bacou (Maico)	(France) Jean-Claude Nowak (Maico)	(France) Christian Neimer (Monark)	(France) Jean-Jacques Bruno (KTM)	-
1973	(France) Serge Bacou (Bultaco)	(France) Jean-Claude Nowak (Montesa)	(France) Louis Jallat (Yamaha)	(France) Michel Merel (Montesa)	-
1972	(France) Serge Bacou (Bultaco)	(France) Jean-Claude Nowak (Montesa)	(France) Gilles Francru (Husqvarna)	(France) Jean-Claude Bontemps (Husqvarna)	-
1971	(France) Serge Bacou (Bultaco)	(France) Serge Bacou (Bultaco)	-	(France) Patrick Drobecq (Yamaha)	-
1970	(France) Denis Portal (Maico)	-	-	(France) Jean-Pierre Mougin (Maico)	-
1969	(France) Jacques Vernier (ČZ)	-	-	(France) Roger Barbara (Husqvarna)	-
		250cc National Champion			
1968	(France) Jacky Porte (Montesa)	(France) Joël Queirel (Maico)	-	-	-
1967	(France) Guy Bertrand (Triumph)	(France) Jacky Porte (Montesa)	-	-	-
1966	(France) Jean-Claude Regnault (Métisse)	(France) Denis Portal (Bultaco)	-	-	-
1965	(France) Guy Bertrand (Triumph)	(France) Vincent Clerici (Husqvarna)	-	-	-
1964	(France) Guy Bertrand (Triumph)	(France) Vincent Clerici (Husqvarna)	-	-	-
1963	(France) Guy Bertrand (Triumph)	(France) René Combes (Greeves)	-	-	-
1962	(France) Jean Hazianis (Triumph)	(France) Vincent Clerici (Greeves)	-	-	-
1961	(France) André Chuchart (Triumph)	(France) Michel Desbois (Maico)	-	-	-
1960	(France) Robert Klym (BSA)	(France) Michel Desbois (Maico)	-	-	-
1959	(France) Jean Hazianis (BSA)	(France) Michel Desbois (Maico)	-	-	-
1958	(France) Robert Klym (BSA)	(France) Michel Desbois (Maico)	-	-	-
1957	(France) Gilbert Brassine (BSA)	-	-	-	-
1956	(France) Michel Jacquemin (BSA)	-	-	-	-
	500cc National Champion	250cc National Champion	350cc National Champion		
1955	(France) Charles Molinari (Gilera)	(France) Georges Delpeyrat (NSU)	(France) Jean Hazianis (BSA)	-	-
1954	(France) Charles Molinari (Gilera)	(France) René Klym (NSU)	(France) Robert Klym (BSA)	-	-
1953	(France) Gilbert Brassine (BSA)	(France) Michel Benard (NSU)	(France) Paul Godey (BSA)	-	-
1952	(France) Gilbert Brassine (FN)	(France) Michel Benard (NSU)	(France) Charles Molinari (BSA)	-	-
1951	(France) Gilbert Brassine (FN)	(France) René Klym (NSU)	(France) Jacques Melioli	-	-
1950	(France) Gilbert Brassine (Saroléa)	(France) Robert Moury (Puch)	(France) Henri Frantz (Matchless)	-	-
1949	(France) Michel Verrecchia (Triumph)	(France) Robert Moury (DKW)	-	-	-
