= 2002 Race of Champions =

Seasons
- ← 2001 2003 →

The 2002 Race of Champions took place on November 29 to December 1 at Gran Canaria. It was the 15th running of the event, and the 11th at Gran Canaria.

The vehicles used were the Peugeot 206 WRC, the Mitsubishi Lancer Evolution VI Group N, the SEAT Córdoba WRC and the ROC Buggy.

The individual competition was won by Marcus Grönholm, whilst the Nations' Cup was won by USA with Jeff Gordon, Jimmie Johnson and Colin Edwards.

== Participants ==
| Country | Racing Driver | Rally Driver | Motorcycle Racer |
|---|---|---|---|
| France | Sébastien Bourdais | Sébastien Loeb | Mickaël Maschio |
| United States | Jeff Gordon | Jimmie Johnson | Colin Edwards |
| (United Kingdom) Great Britain | James Thompson | Robbie Head | James Haydon |
| Finland | JJ Lehto | Marcus Grönholm | Kari Tiainen |
| Spain | Fernando Alonso | Jesús Puras | Carlos Checa |
| Sweden | Kenny Brack | Thomas Rådström | Tony Rickardsson |
| Italy | Fabrizio Giovanardi | Renato Travaglia | Marco Melandri |
| Germany | Nick Heidfeld | Walter Röhrl | Pit Beirer |
| Brazil | Cristiano da Matta | Antônio Pizzonia | Alex Barros |

== Junior Rally Masters ==
=== Group stage ===
| Driver | Races | Wins | Losses | Best Time |
|---|---|---|---|---|
| (Belgium) François Duval | 3 | 3 | 0 | 2:12.00 |
| (Spain) Francisco Suárez | 3 | 2 | 1 | 2:17.47 |
| (Spain) Dani Solà | 3 | 1 | 2 | 2:17.54 |
| (United Kingdom) Niall McShea | 3 | 0 | 3 | 2:18.09 |

| Driver 1 | Time 1 | Driver 2 | Time 2 |
|---|---|---|---|
| (Belgium) François Duval | 2:15.37 | (Spain) Dani Solà | 2:19.26 |
| (Spain) Francisco Suárez | 2:19.89 | (United Kingdom) Niall McShea | 2:22.01 |
| (United Kingdom) Niall McShea | 2:19.76 | (Belgium) François Duval | 2:14.01 |
| (Spain) Dani Solà | 2:19.58 | (Spain) Francisco Suárez | 2:17.47 |
| (Spain) Francisco Suárez | 2:15.41 | (Belgium) François Duval | 2:12.00 |
| (Spain) Dani Solà | 2:17.54 | (United Kingdom) Niall McShea | 2:18.09 |

=== Final ===
| Final |
| (Belgium) François Duval | 2 |
| (Spain) Francisco Suárez | 0 |

| Driver 1 | Time 1 | Driver 2 | Time 2 |
|---|---|---|---|
| (Belgium) François Duval | 2:10.92 | (Spain) Francisco Suárez | 2:13.52 |
| (Belgium) François Duval | 2:00.99 | (Spain) Francisco Suárez | 2:05.28 |

== Nations' Cup ==
=== Group stage ===
==== Group A ====
| Pos. | Team | Races | Wins | Losses | Total Time | Driver | Wins | Losses | Best Time |
|---|---|---|---|---|---|---|---|---|---|
| 1 | Finland | 6 | 4 | 2 | 5:54.06 | Marcus Grönholm | 2 | 0 | 1:57.55 |
| 1 | Finland | 6 | 4 | 2 | 5:54.06 | JJ Lehto | 0 | 2 | 1:55.91 |
| 1 | Finland | 6 | 4 | 2 | 5:54.06 | Kari Tiainen | 2 | 0 | 2:00.60 |
| 2 | Sweden | 6 | 4 | 2 | 5:56.11 | Thomas Rådström | 1 | 1 | 1:58.02 |
| 2 | Sweden | 6 | 4 | 2 | 5:56.11 | Kenny Brack | 2 | 0 | 1:52.96 |
| 2 | Sweden | 6 | 4 | 2 | 5:56.11 | Tony Rickardsson | 1 | 1 | 2:05.13 |
| 3 | (United Kingdom) UK | 6 | 1 | 5 | 6:01.47 | Robbie Head | 0 | 2 | 1:58.93 |
| 3 | (United Kingdom) UK | 6 | 1 | 5 | 6:01.47 | James Thompson | 1 | 1 | 1:54.45 |
| 3 | (United Kingdom) UK | 6 | 1 | 5 | 6:01.47 | James Haydon | 0 | 2 | 2:08.09 |

| Team 1 | Time 1 | Score | Team 2 | Time 2 |
| (United Kingdom) UK | | 1–2 | Finland | |
|---|---|---|---|---|
| James Haydon | 2:08.09 | 1–2 | Kari Tiainen | 2:03.86 |
| James Thompson | 1:56.80 | 1–2 | JJ Lehto | 1:57.34 |
| Robbie Head | 2:03.07 | 1–2 | Marcus Grönholm | 1:59.69 |
| Finland | | 2–1 | Sweden | |
| Kari Tiainen | 2:00.60 | 2–1 | Tony Rickardsson | 2:05.13 |
| JJ Lehto | 1:55.91 | 2–1 | Kenny Brack | 1:54.51 |
| Marcus Grönholm | 1:57.55 | 2–1 | Thomas Rådström | 2:00.06 |
| Sweden | | 3–0 | (United Kingdom) UK | |
| Tony Rickardsson | 2:06.49 | 3–0 | James Haydon | DNF |
| Kenny Brack | 1:52.96 | 3–0 | James Thompson | 1:54.45 |
| Thomas Rådström | 1:58.02 | 3–0 | Robbie Head | 1:58.93 |

==== Group B ====
| Pos. | Team | Races | Wins | Losses | Total Time | Driver | Wins | Losses | Best Time |
|---|---|---|---|---|---|---|---|---|---|
| 1 | Italy | 6 | 5 | 1 | 5:46.71 | Renato Travaglia | 1 | 1 | 1:56.80 |
| 1 | Italy | 6 | 5 | 1 | 5:46.71 | Fabrizio Giovanardi | 2 | 0 | 1:52.67 |
| 1 | Italy | 6 | 5 | 1 | 5:46.71 | Marco Melandri | 2 | 0 | 1:57.24 |
| 2 | France | 6 | 3 | 3 | 5:47.11 | Sébastien Loeb | 2 | 0 | 1:55.95 |
| 2 | France | 6 | 3 | 3 | 5:47.11 | Sébastien Bourdais | 0 | 2 | 1:53.54 |
| 2 | France | 6 | 3 | 3 | 5:47.11 | Mickaël Maschio | 1 | 1 | 1:57.62 |
| 3 | Germany | 6 | 1 | 5 | 5:55.80 | Walter Röhrl | 0 | 2 | 1:56.89 |
| 3 | Germany | 6 | 1 | 5 | 5:55.80 | Nick Heidfeld | 1 | 1 | 1:53.44 |
| 3 | Germany | 6 | 1 | 5 | 5:55.80 | Pit Beirer | 0 | 2 | 2:05.47 |

| Team 1 | Time 1 | Score | Team 2 | Time 2 |
| Italy | | 3–0 | Germany | |
|---|---|---|---|---|
| Marco Melandri | 2:00.46 | 3–0 | Pit Beirer | 2:05.47 |
| Fabrizio Giovanardi | 1:53.40 | 3–0 | Nick Heidfeld | 1:55.41 |
| Renato Travaglia | 1:57.44 | 3–0 | Walter Röhrl | 2:14.35 |
| Germany | | 1–2 | France | |
| Pit Beirer | 2:07.68 | 1–2 | Mickaël Maschio | 1:59.29 |
| Nick Heidfeld | 1:53.44 | 1–2 | Sébastien Bourdais | 1:53.60 |
| Walter Röhrl | 1:56.89 | 1–2 | Sébastien Loeb | 1:56.41 |
| France | | 1–2 | Italy | |
| Mickaël Maschio | 1:57.62 | 1–2 | Marco Melandri | 1:57.24 |
| Sébastien Bourdais | 1:53.54 | 1–2 | Fabrizio Giovanardi | 1:52.67 |
| Sébastien Loeb | 1:55.95 | 1–2 | Renato Travaglia | 1:56.80 |

- France made the semi-finals by having the fastest times of the losing teams.

==== Group C ====
| Pos. | Team | Races | Wins | Losses | Total Time | Driver | Wins | Losses | Best Time |
|---|---|---|---|---|---|---|---|---|---|
| 1 | (United States) USA | 6 | 4 | 2 | 5:48.42 | Jimmie Johnson | 1 | 1 | 1:58.52 |
| 1 | (United States) USA | 6 | 4 | 2 | 5:48.42 | Jeff Gordon | 1 | 1 | 1:53.44 |
| 1 | (United States) USA | 6 | 4 | 2 | 5:48.42 | Colin Edwards | 2 | 0 | 1:56.43 |
| 2 | Spain | 6 | 4 | 2 | 5:50.61 | (Spain) Jesús Puras | 2 | 0 | 1:57.60 |
| 2 | Spain | 6 | 4 | 2 | 5:50.61 | Fernando Alonso | 1 | 2 | 1:53.84 |
| 2 | Spain | 6 | 4 | 2 | 5:50.61 | Carlos Checa | 1 | 1 | 1:59.17 |
| 3 | Brazil | 6 | 1 | 5 | 5:59.08 | Antônio Pizzonia | 0 | 2 | 2:02.53 |
| 3 | Brazil | 6 | 1 | 5 | 5:59.08 | Cristiano da Matta | 1 | 1 | 1:58.26 |
| 3 | Brazil | 6 | 1 | 5 | 5:59.08 | Alex Barros | 0 | 2 | 1:58.29 |

| Team 1 | Time 1 | Score | Team 2 | Time 2 |
| (United States) USA | | 2–1 | Brazil | |
|---|---|---|---|---|
| Colin Edwards | 1:56.97 | 2–1 | Alex Barros | 1:58.29 |
| Jeff Gordon | 2:07.03 | 2–1 | Cristiano da Matta | 2:03.48 |
| Jimmie Johnson | 2:02.44 | 2–1 | Antônio Pizzonia | 2:04.36 |
| Brazil | | 0–3 | Spain | |
| Alex Barros | 1:59.42 | 0–3 | Carlos Checa | 1:59.27 |
| Cristiano da Matta | 1:58.26 | 0–3 | Fernando Alonso | 1:54.07 |
| Antônio Pizzonia | 2:02.53 | 0–3 | Jesús Puras | 1:58.81 |
| Spain | | 1–2 | (United States) USA | |
| Carlos Checa | 1:59.17 | 1–2 | Colin Edwards | 1:56.43 |
| Fernando Alonso | 1:53.84 | 1–2 | Jeff Gordon | 1:53.47 |
| Jesús Puras | 1:57.60 | 1–2 | Jimmie Johnson | 1:58.52 |

==== Best Times ====
| Pos. | Rally | | Racing | | Motorcycle | |
| | Driver | Best Time | Driver | Best Time | Driver | Best Time |
|---|---|---|---|---|---|---|
| 1 | (France) Sébastien Loeb | 1:55.95 | (Italy) Fabrizio Giovanardi | 1:52.67 | (United States) Colin Edwards | 1:56.43 |
| 2 | (Italy) Renato Travaglia | 1:56.80 | (Sweden) Kenny Brack | 1:52.96 | (Italy) Marco Melandri | 1:57.24 |
| 3 | (Germany) Walter Röhrl | 1:56.89 | (Germany) Nick Heidfeld | 1:53.44 | (France) Mickaël Maschio | 1:57.62 |
| 4 | (Finland) Marcus Grönholm | 1:57.55 | (United States) Jeff Gordon | 1:53.44 | (Brazil) Alex Barros | 1:58.29 |
| 5 | (Spain) Jesús Puras | 1:57.60 | (France) Sébastien Bourdais | 1:53.54 | (Spain) Carlos Checa | 1:59.17 |
| 6 | (Sweden) Thomas Rådström | 1:58.02 | (Spain) Fernando Alonso | 1:53.84 | (Finland) Kari Tiainen | 2:00.60 |
| 7 | (United States) Jimmie Johnson | 1:58.52 | (United Kingdom) James Thompson | 1:54.45 | (Sweden) Tony Rickardsson | 2:05.13 |
| 8 | (United Kingdom) Robbie Head | 1:58.93 | (Finland) JJ Lehto | 1:55.91 | (Germany) Pit Beirer | 2:05.47 |
| 9 | (Brazil) Antônio Pizzonia | 2:02.53 | (Brazil) Cristiano da Matta | 1:58.26 | (United Kingdom) James Haydon | 2:08.09 |

=== Knockout stage ===
Semi-finals
Italy | 3
Finland | 1
USA | 3
France | 2

Final
Italy | 1
USA | 3

==== Semifinals ====
| Team 1 | Time 1 | Score | Team 2 | Time 2 |
| Finland | | 1–3 | Italy | |
|---|---|---|---|---|
| Kari Tiainen | 2:01.71 | 1–3 | Marco Melandri | 1:57.85 |
| JJ Lehto | 1:56.60 | 1–3 | Fabrizio Giovanardi | 1:55.27 |
| Marcus Grönholm | 1:58.58 | 1–3 | Renato Travaglia | 2:00.50 |
| Kari Tiainen | 1:59.99 | 1–3 | Marco Melandri | 1:56.91 |
| (United States) USA | | 3–2 | France | |
| Colin Edwards | 1:57.67 | 3–2 | Mickaël Maschio | 1:58.84 |
| Jeff Gordon | 2:04.94 (penalty) | 3–2 | Sébastien Bourdais | 1:54.27 |
| Jimmie Johnson | 1:58.11 | 3–2 | Sébastien Loeb | 1:58.02 |
| Colin Edwards | 1:56.25 | 3–2 | Mickaël Maschio | DNF |
| Jeff Gordon | 1:53.20 | 3–2 | Sébastien Bourdais | 1:56.47 |

==== Final ====
| Team 1 | Time 1 | Score | Team 2 | Time 2 |
| Italy | | 1–3 | (United States) USA | |
|---|---|---|---|---|
| Marco Melandri | 1:57.25 | 1–3 | Colin Edwards | 1:56.16 |
| Fabrizio Giovanardi | 1:54.02 | 1–3 | Jeff Gordon | 1:53.87 |
| Renato Travaglia | 1:54.01 | 1–3 | Jimmie Johnson | 1:54.67 |
| Marco Melandri | 3:04.83 | 1–3 | Colin Edwards | 2:12.99 |

== Race of Champions ==
Participation in the main Race of Champions was awarded primarily on the basis of having the best times in the Nations' Cup. There were several exceptions to this rule however – Harri Rovanperä, as the defending champion, was guaranteed a spot, whilst Colin Edwards, despite having the best time among motorcyclists in the Nations' Cup, did not participate. François Duval secured his place by winning the Junior event, Luis Monzón won the Spanish Masters event, and Stig Blomqvist was an invited 'seeded' driver. Jimmie Johnson received a 'wild-card' entry, replacing Nations' Cup teammate Jeff Gordon who was sidelined by food poisoning.

=== Group stage ===
==== Group A ====
| Driver | Races | Wins | Losses | Best Time |
|---|---|---|---|---|
| (Belgium) François Duval | 3 | 2 | 1 | 1:54.15 |
| (Spain) Luis Monzón | 3 | 2 | 1 | 1:55.80 |
| (Sweden) Stig Blomqvist | 3 | 1 | 2 | 1:55.23 |
| (Spain) Jesús Puras | 3 | 1 | 2 | 1:57.27 |

| Driver 1 | Time 1 | Driver 2 | Time 2 |
|---|---|---|---|
| (Spain) Jesús Puras | 1:57.27 | (Sweden) Stig Blomqvist | 1:58.06 |
| (Spain) Jesús Puras | 1:57.62 | (Belgium) François Duval | 1:55.20 |
| (Spain) Jesús Puras | 1:56.74 | (Spain) Luis Monzón | 1:55.80 |
| (Belgium) François Duval | 1:54.60 | (Sweden) Stig Blomqvist | 1:55.44 |
| (Sweden) Stig Blomqvist | 1:55.23 | (Spain) Luis Monzón | DNF |
| (Belgium) François Duval | 2:04.15 (penalty) | (Spain) Luis Monzón | 1:56.95 |

==== Group B ====
| Driver | Races | Wins | Losses | Best Time |
|---|---|---|---|---|
| (Sweden) Kenny Brack | 3 | 3 | 0 | 1:54.92 |
| (Italy) Marco Melandri | 3 | 2 | 1 | 1:53.74 |
| (Italy) Renato Travaglia | 3 | 1 | 2 | 1:58.96 |
| (Italy) Fabrizio Giovanardi | 3 | 0 | 3 | 1:54.50 |

| Driver 1 | Time 1 | Driver 2 | Time 2 |
|---|---|---|---|
| (Italy) Fabrizio Giovanardi | 1:58.98 | (Italy) Renato Travaglia | 1:58.96 |
| (Sweden) Kenny Brack | 1:55.44 | (Italy) Renato Travaglia | 1:56.61 |
| (Italy) Renato Travaglia | 1:56.62 | (Italy) Marco Melandri | 1:55.17 |
| (Italy) Fabrizio Giovanardi | 1:55.55 | (Sweden) Kenny Brack | 1:54.92 |
| (Italy) Fabrizio Giovanardi | 1:54.50 | (Italy) Marco Melandri | 1:53.74 |
| (Italy) Marco Melandri | Withdrew | (Sweden) Kenny Brack | Bye |

=== Knockout stage ===
Quarter-finals
(Finland) Marcus Grönholm | 2
(United States) Jimmie Johnson | 0
(Italy) Marco Melandri | 0
(Belgium) François Duval | 2
(France) Sébastien Loeb | 2
(Spain) Luis Monzón | 0
(Finland) Harri Rovanperä | 2
(Sweden) Kenny Brack | 1

Semi-finals
(Finland) Marcus Grönholm | 2
(Belgium) François Duval | 0
(France) Sébastien Loeb | 2
(Finland) Harri Rovanperä | 0

Final
(Finland) Marcus Grönholm | 2
(France) Sébastien Loeb | 1

==== Quarterfinals ====
| Driver 1 | Time 1 | Driver 2 | Time 2 |
|---|---|---|---|
| (Finland) Marcus Grönholm | 1:57.71 | (United States) Jimmie Johnson | 1:57.94 |
| (Finland) Marcus Grönholm | 1:53.29 | (United States) Jimmie Johnson | DNF |
| (Italy) Marco Melandri | DNF | (Belgium) François Duval | 2:02.30 |
| (Italy) Marco Melandri | 3:18.78 | (Belgium) François Duval | 2:26.20 |
| (France) Sébastien Loeb | 1:57.85 | (Spain) Luis Monzón | 2:00.49 |
| (France) Sébastien Loeb | 1:57.87 | (Spain) Luis Monzón | 1:58.87 |
| (Finland) Harri Rovanperä | 1:58.28 | (Sweden) Kenny Brack | 1:58.88 |
| (Finland) Harri Rovanperä | 1:54.46 | (Sweden) Kenny Brack | 1:53.98 |
| (Finland) Harri Rovanperä | 1:54.32 | (Sweden) Kenny Brack | 2:40.90 |

==== Semifinals ====
| Driver 1 | Time 1 | Driver 2 | Time 2 |
|---|---|---|---|
| (Finland) Marcus Grönholm | 1:59.32 | (Belgium) François Duval | 2:25.41 |
| (Finland) Marcus Grönholm | 1:52.65 | (Belgium) François Duval | DNF |
| (France) Sébastien Loeb | 1:57.19 | (Finland) Harri Rovanperä | 1:57.88 |
| (France) Sébastien Loeb | 1:53.81 | (Finland) Harri Rovanperä | 1:54.81 |

==== Final ====
| Driver 1 | Time 1 | Driver 2 | Time 2 |
|---|---|---|---|
| (Finland) Marcus Grönholm | 1:53.07 | (France) Sébastien Loeb | 1:53.15 |
| (Finland) Marcus Grönholm | 1:52.05 | (France) Sébastien Loeb | 1:51.54 |
| (Finland) Marcus Grönholm | 1:51.87 | (France) Sébastien Loeb | 1:52.74 |
