= Velta Machine-Building Plant =

Velta Machine-Building Plant (Russian: ОАО «Велта») was a company based in Perm, Russia.

Perm Velta was a large enterprise that produced electronics for the military. It also produced (among several types of consumer goods) bicycles, for which it had about 20% of the Russian market, and auto spare parts. It also exported some bicycles.

The company was established in June 1939 by order of the People's Commissariat of Ammunition. In 1946 production switched to civilian products such as gramophones, and ten years later, the production of bicycles.

In 1990 the plant became part of the Perm-Avto joint venture with Autokam and FSV International Ltd to produce Rickman Ranger cars under licence. The Velta plant went bankrupt in 2006.
