= 2001 Race of Champions =

Motorsports competition

Seasons
- ← 2000 2002 →

The 2001 Race of Champions took place on December 7 to 9 at Gran Canaria. It was the 14th running of the event, and the 10th running at Gran Canaria. There was a slight format change for this year – The International Masters event was replaced by the Junior Masters event, open to rally drivers under the age of 30. Seeding for the main Race of Champions event was no longer awarded on the basis of having won a WRC title, but places were awarded for having posted the fastest times in the Nations Cup.

The vehicles used were the Peugeot 206 WRC, the Mitsubishi Lancer Evolution VI WRC, the SEAT Córdoba WRC, the Saab 93 Rallycross car and the ROC Buggy.

The individual competition was won by Harri Rovanpera, whilst the Nations Cup was won by Spain with Fernando Alonso, Jesús Puras and Rubén Xaus.

== Participants ==
=== Race of Champions ===
| Driver | Reason for Qualification |
|---|---|
| (Finland) Marcus Grönholm | World Rally champion in 2000 |
| (Sweden) Stig Blomqvist | Winner in the Legends Race |
| (Belgium) François Duval | Winner in the Junior Masters |
| (Italy) Valentino Rossi | Invitation |
| (Finland) Juha Kankkunen | Seeded |
| (Germany) Armin Schwarz | Best times among Rally Drivers in Nations' Cup |
| (Finland) Harri Rovanpera | Best times among Rally Drivers in Nations' Cup |
| (France) Gilles Panizzi | Best times among Rally Drivers in Nations' Cup |
| (United Kingdom) Alister McRae | Best times among Rally Drivers in Nations' Cup |
| (United States) Jeff Gordon | Fastest Racing Driver in Nations' Cup |
| (Spain) Rubén Xaus | Fastest Motorcycle Racer in Nations' Cup |
| (Spain) Flavio Alonso | Winner in the Spanish Masters |

=== Nations' Cup ===
| Country | Racing Driver | Rally Driver | Motorcycle Racer |
|---|---|---|---|
| France | Paul Belmondo | Gilles Panizzi | Olivier Jacque |
| United States | Robby Gordon | Rhys Millen | Shaun Palmer |
| (United Kingdom) Great Britain | Johnny Herbert | Alister McRae | James Dobb |
| Finland | Heikki Kovalainen | Marcus Grönholm | Kari Tiainen |
| Spain | Fernando Alonso | Jesús Puras | Rubén Xaus |
| Italy | Emanuele Pirro | Miki Biasion | Valentino Rossi |
| Germany | Frank Biela | Armin Schwarz | Katja Poensgen |
| All-Stars | (Denmark) Tom Kristensen | (Finland) Harri Rovanpera | (Australia) Troy Bayliss |

== Legends Race ==
- Antonio Zanini was a late substitute for Hannu Mikkola.

Group A

| Driver | Wins | Losses | Best Time |
|---|---|---|---|
| (Sweden) Stig Blomqvist | 2 | 0 | 1'59.88 |
| (Finland) Timo Salonen | 1 | 1 | 1'59.82 |
| (Sweden) Björn Waldegård | 0 | 2 | 2'00.84 |

Group B

| Driver | Wins | Losses | Best Time |
|---|---|---|---|
| (Italy) Miki Biasion | 2 | 1 | 2'09.65 |
| (Sweden) Per Eklund | 1 | 1 | 2'11.91 |
| (Spain) Antonio Zanini | 0 | 2 | 2'13.13 |

Semi-finals
(Sweden) Stig Blomqvist | 2
(Sweden) Per Eklund | 0
(Italy) Miki Biasion | 0
(Finland) Timo Salonen | 2

Final
(Sweden) Stig Blomqvist | 2
(Finland) Timo Salonen | 0

== Junior Rally Masters ==
| Driver | Wins | Losses | Best Time |
|---|---|---|---|
| (Belgium) François Duval | 3 | 0 | 2'13.10 |
| (France) Sébastien Loeb | 2 | 1 | 2'16.23 |
| (Argentina) Gabriel Pozzo | 1 | 2 | 2'16.69 |
| (Portugal) Miguel Campos | 0 | 3 | 2'15.80 |

| Final |
| (Belgium) François Duval | 1 |
| (France) Sébastien Loeb | 0 |

== Race of Champions ==
Heat A

| Driver | Wins | Losses | Best Time |
|---|---|---|---|
| (Germany) Armin Schwarz | 2 | 1 | 1'56.13 |
| (Finland) Harri Rovanpera | 2 | 1 | 1'56.60 |
| (Finland) Juha Kankkunen | 2 | 1 | 1'56.85 |
| (Spain) Fernando Alonso | 0 | 3 | 1'56.69 |

Heat B

| Driver | Wins | Losses | Best Time |
|---|---|---|---|
| (United Kingdom) Alister McRae | 3 | 0 | 1'56.63 |
| (United States) Jeff Gordon | 2 | 1 | 1'55.21 |
| (France) Gilles Panizzi | 1 | 2 | 1'56.82 |
| (Spain) Rubén Xaus | 0 | 3 | 1'59.61 |

Quarter-finals
(Finland) Marcus Grönholm | 0
(Finland) Harri Rovanpera | 2
(Sweden) Stig Blomqvist | 0
(Belgium) François Duval | 2
(United Kingdom) Alister McRae | 2
(Italy) Valentino Rossi | 0
(Germany) Armin Schwarz | 2
(United States) Jeff Gordon | 0

Semi-finals
(Finland) Harri Rovanpera | 2
(Belgium) François Duval | 1
(United Kingdom) Alister McRae | 0
(Germany) Armin Schwarz | 2

Final
(Finland) Harri Rovanpera | 2
(Germany) Armin Schwarz | 1

== Nations Cup ==
Group A

| Team | Match Wins | Heat Wins | Best Total Time |
|---|---|---|---|
| Spain | 2 | 5 | 5'44.53 |
| All-Star | 2 | 4 | 5'46.17 |
| (United Kingdom) UK | 1 | 5 | 5'48.53 |
| Italy | 1 | 4 | 5'43.19 |

Group B

| Team | Match Wins | Heat Wins | Best Total Time |
|---|---|---|---|
| USA | 2 | 6 | 5'44.95 |
| France | 2 | 4 | 5'51.20 |
| Finland | 1 | 4 | 5'46.01 |
| Germany | 1 | 4 | 5'56.24 |

Semi-finals
Spain | 3
France | 1
USA | 0
All-Star | 3

Final
Spain | 3
All-Star | 1
