= Avtokam =

Former Russian auto association

- Native name: Автокам
- Company type: Association (before 1993); Closed joint stock company (after 1993)
- Industry: Automotive
- Founded: 1989
- Founder: Grigory Rysin
- Defunct: 1999
- Headquarters: Naberezhnye Chelny, Tatarstan, Russia
- Products: Automobiles

Avtokam (Russian: Ассоциация Автокам) was a Russian association of car manufacturers. The company was organised as an association in which members contributed their shares in the form of free workshops.

It was founded in 1989 following a conference in Yelabuga Tatarstan, during which it was decided to create a new venture focused on the production of inexpensive vehicles by a screwdriver assembly process.

== Members ==
The venture started as an association of manufacturers, with 37 enterprises pooling their resources.

These included the following: Karpov Chemical Plant (Mendeleyevsk), Ivanovo Machine Tool Association (provided plant in Shuya), joint venture "Intertap", Tatneftekhimmontage, and others.

== Location ==
Although it was an executive committee member of the Yelabuzhsky registered company city, it soon moved its headquarters to Naberezhnye Chelny.

Initially, it was planned that the assembly would be carried out in Mendeleyevsky and Shuya.

== Foreign Partner ==
FSV, a British company that released the Rickman Ranger car with rear-wheel drive and the frame structure, was selected as a foreign partner.

According to the agreement, 70% of the car company was to be sent to FSV, with plans to fully localise the assembly in the future.

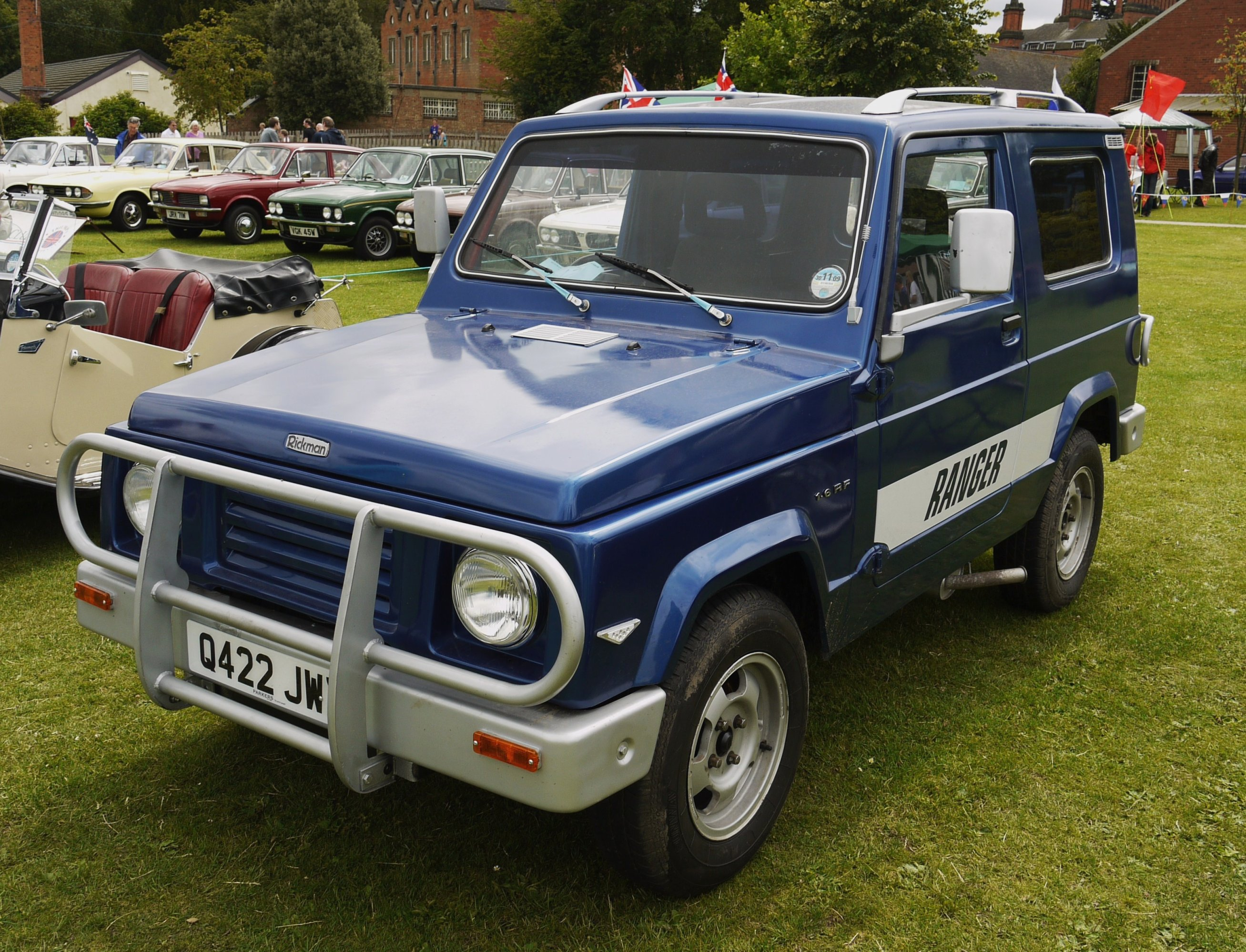
Autokam Ranger/2160 short wheelbase version

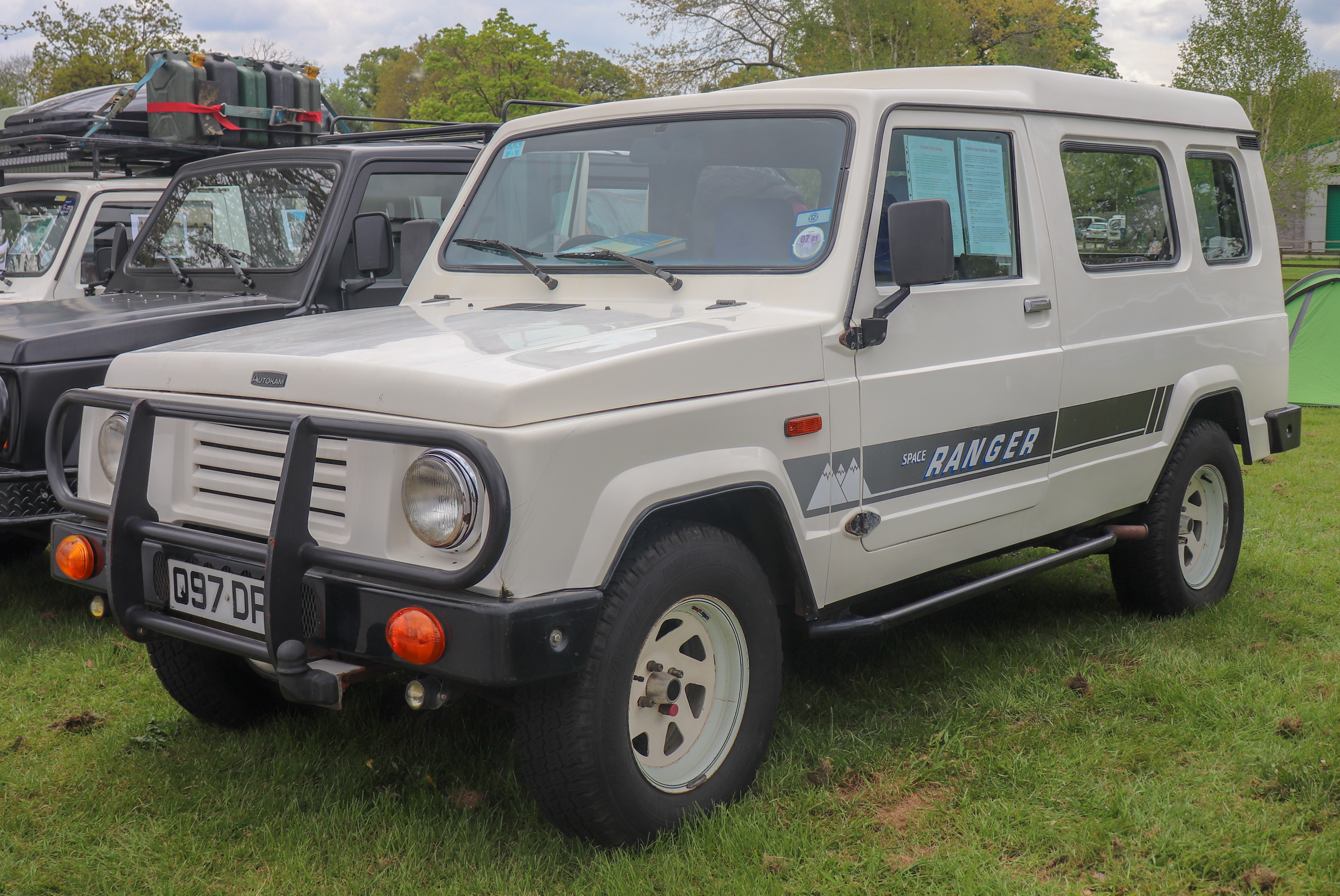
Autokam 2160 long-wheelbase version

== History ==
- In 1992, the cars were renamed to Avtokam-2160.

Before the year ended, 48 cars were collected in Mendeleevsk and Shuya, along with 2 cars in Kadiivka.

The partnership with FSV ended. It failed to add another 950 kits, and it disappeared.

Due to contradictions among the plants, production was discontinued in Shuya, and imported parts were replaced by Russian parts.

- In 1993, production began at the Velta Machine-Building Plant, which led to the formation of a joint venture called Permavto Ltd, together with Avtokam (in 1993 became a joint-stock company), Perm factory "MASHINOSTROITEL", and the Ural Research Institute of composite materials.

The company cars were now called Avtokam-Parma.

- In 1994, Avtokam formed a new Open joint-stock company, named "Perm-avto."
- In 1995, Avtokam left the joint venture by selling its technical documentation.
- In 1995, Zavaod became a subsidiary of the joint Russian-Austrian venture Mende-Rossi. Production in Mendeleevsk lasted until 1997.

In 1997, production was discontinued in Perm.

- In 1999, one more car was released, and then its production ceased.

== Facilities ==
- Toyma plant, Mendeleyevsk (1991–1997)
- Teza plant, Shuya (1991–1992)
- Velta Machine-Building Plant (1993–1997, 1999)

== Models ==
- Autokam Ranger (1991)
- Autokam-2160 (1992–1997, 1999)
- Autokam-Parma (1993)
- Autokam-2160 long (1995–1997)
- Velta-2163 (1997)
- Velta-21631 (1997)
