= 2003 Race of Champions =

Motor Car Race

Seasons
- ← 2002 2004 →

The 2003 Race of Champions took place on November 28–30 at Gran Canaria for the final time. It was also the last year for three-car teams in the Nations' Cup (including one motorcycle racer), with the focus on rally drivers fading after this year's event due to the later stadium-based venues using all-tarmac tracks.

The vehicles used were the Peugeot 206 WRC, the Mitsubishi Lancer Evolution VIII Group N, the Subaru Impreza WRX and the ROC Buggy.

The individual competition was won by Sébastien Loeb, whilst the Nations' Cup was won by the All-Star line-up of Fonsi Nieto, Gilles Panizzi and Cristiano da Matta.

== Participants ==
| Country | Racing Driver | Rally Driver | Motorcycle Racer |
|---|---|---|---|
| France | Olivier Panis | Sébastien Loeb | Randy de Puniet |
| United States | Boris Said | Casey Mears | Travis Pastrana |
| (United Kingdom) Great Britain | Guy Smith | David Higgins | James Toseland |
| Finland | JJ Lehto | Timo Salonen | Samuli Aro |
| Spain | Oriol Servià | Flavio Alonso | Emilio Alzamora |
| Sweden | Björn Wirdheim | Daniel Carlsson | Tony Rickardsson |
| Italy | Rinaldo Capello | Renato Travaglia | Alessandro Gramigni |
| Germany | Sven Heidfeld | Armin Kremer | Alex Hofmann |
| All-Stars | (Brazil) Cristiano da Matta | (France) Gilles Panizzi | (Spain) Fonsi Nieto |

- Nick Heidfeld was originally confirmed for Germany but had prior commitments, his brother Sven took his place.
- Johnny Herbert was originally confirmed for Great Britain but had prior commitments, Guy Smith took his place.
- Marcus Grönholm was to represent Finland, but due to testing commitments could not arrive in time for the Nations Cup. Timo Salonen took his place.
- Kenny Brack was to represent Sweden, but due to injury sustained in a CART accident Björn Wirdheim took his place.

== Junior Rally Masters ==
=== Group stage ===
| Driver | Races | Wins | Losses | Best Time |
|---|---|---|---|---|
| (Belgium) François Duval | 3 | 3 | 0 | 2:10.04 |
| (Sweden) Daniel Carlsson | 3 | 2 | 1 | 2:09.28 |
| (Spain) Txus Jaio | 3 | 1 | 2 | 2:19.27 |
| (Spain) Francisco Suárez | 3 | 0 | 3 | 2:10.66 |

| Driver 1 | Time 1 | Driver 2 | Time 2 |
|---|---|---|---|
| (Sweden) Daniel Carlsson | 2:15.11 | (Belgium) François Duval | 2:13.13 |
| (Spain) Txus Jaio | 2:19.27 | (Spain) Francisco Suárez | DNF |
| (Belgium) François Duval | 2:11.68 | (Spain) Txus Jaio | 02:15.78 |
| (Spain) Francisco Suárez | 2:23.69 (penalty) | (Sweden) Daniel Carlsson | 2:11.51 |
| (Belgium) François Duval | 2:10.04 | (Spain) Francisco Suárez | 2:10.66 |
| (Spain) Txus Jaio | 2:12.10 | (Sweden) Daniel Carlsson | 2:09.28 |

=== Final ===
| Final |
| (Belgium) François Duval | 1 |
| (Sweden) Daniel Carlsson | 0 |

| Driver 1 | Time 1 | Driver 2 | Time 2 |
|---|---|---|---|
| (Belgium) François Duval | 1:59.04 | (Sweden) Daniel Carlsson | 1:59.76 |

== Nations' Cup ==
=== Group stage ===
==== Group A ====
| Pos. | Team | Races | Wins | Losses | Total Time | Driver | Wins | Losses | Best Time |
|---|---|---|---|---|---|---|---|---|---|
| 1 | Sweden | 6 | 4 | 2 | 6:00.60 | Daniel Carlsson | 1 | 1 | 1:56.77 |
| 1 | Sweden | 6 | 4 | 2 | 6:00.60 | Björn Wirdheim | 1 | 1 | 2:01.13 |
| 1 | Sweden | 6 | 4 | 2 | 6:00.60 | Tony Rickardsson | 2 | 0 | 2:02.70 |
| 2 | Finland | 6 | 3 | 3 | 5:56.92 | Timo Salonen | 1 | 1 | 1:57.69 |
| 2 | Finland | 6 | 3 | 3 | 5:56.92 | JJ Lehto | 2 | 0 | 1:59.32 |
| 2 | Finland | 6 | 3 | 3 | 5:56.92 | Samuli Aro | 0 | 2 | 1:59.91 |
| 3 | France | 6 | 2 | 4 | 5:56.15 | Sébastien Loeb | 1 | 1 | 1:56.05 |
| 3 | France | 6 | 2 | 4 | 5:56.15 | Olivier Panis | 0 | 2 | 2:00.19 |
| 3 | France | 6 | 2 | 4 | 5:56.15 | Randy de Puniet | 1 | 1 | 1:59.91 |

| Team 1 | Time 1 | Score | Team 2 | Time 2 |
| Finland | | 2-1 | Sweden | |
|---|---|---|---|---|
| Samuli Aro | 2:05.68 | 2-1 | Tony Rickardsson | 2:02.70 |
| JJ Lehto | 1:59.77 | 2-1 | Björn Wirdheim | 2:03.58 |
| Timo Salonen | 1:59.93 | 2-1 | Daniel Carlsson | 2:14.20 (penalty) |
| Sweden | | 3-0 | France | |
| Tony Rickardsson | 2:03.24 | 3-0 | Randy de Puniet | 2:13.09 (penalty) |
| Björn Wirdheim | 2:01.13 | 3-0 | Olivier Panis | 2:02.42 |
| Daniel Carlsson | 1:56.77 | 3-0 | Sébastien Loeb | 2:06.91 (penalty) |
| France | | 2-1 | Finland | |
| Randy de Puniet | 1:59.91 | 2-1 | Samuli Aro | 1:59.91 |
| Olivier Panis | 2:00.19 | 2-1 | JJ Lehto | 1:59.32 |
| Sébastien Loeb | 1:56.05 | 2-1 | Timo Salonen | 1:57.69 |

==== Group B ====
| Pos. | Team | Races | Wins | Losses | Total Time | Driver | Wins | Losses | Best Time |
|---|---|---|---|---|---|---|---|---|---|
| 1 | Spain | 6 | 6 | 0 | 5:51.52 | Flavio Alonso | 2 | 0 | 1:56.81 |
| 1 | Spain | 6 | 6 | 0 | 5:51.52 | Oriol Servià | 2 | 0 | 1:57.53 |
| 1 | Spain | 6 | 6 | 0 | 5:51.52 | Emilio Alzamora | 2 | 0 | 1:57.18 |
| 2 | Italy | 6 | 2 | 4 | 6:00.73 | Renato Travaglia | 1 | 1 | 1:56.92 |
| 2 | Italy | 6 | 2 | 4 | 6:00.73 | Rinaldo Capello | 1 | 1 | 1:59.84 |
| 2 | Italy | 6 | 2 | 4 | 6:00.73 | Alessandro Gramigni | 0 | 2 | 2:03.97 |
| 3 | (United Kingdom) Great Britain | 6 | 1 | 5 | 6:03.51 | David Higgins | 0 | 2 | 1:57.72 |
| 3 | (United Kingdom) Great Britain | 6 | 1 | 5 | 6:03.51 | Guy Smith | 0 | 2 | 2:03.73 |
| 3 | (United Kingdom) Great Britain | 6 | 1 | 5 | 6:03.51 | James Toseland | 1 | 1 | 2:02.06 |

| Team 1 | Time 1 | Score | Team 2 | Time 2 |
| Italy | | 2-1 | (United Kingdom) Great Britain | |
|---|---|---|---|---|
| Alessandro Gramigni | 2:03.97 | 2-1 | James Toseland | 2:02.06 |
| Rinaldo Capello | 2:00.05 | 2-1 | Guy Smith | 2:03.73 |
| Renato Travaglia | 1:56.92 | 2-1 | David Higgins | 3:30.70 |
| (United Kingdom) Great Britain | | 0-3 | Spain | |
| James Toseland | DNF | 0-3 | Emilio Alzamora | 1:58.83 |
| Guy Smith | 2:25.56 | 0-3 | Oriol Servià | 2:00.49 |
| David Higgins | 1:57.72 | 0-3 | Flavio Alonso | 1:56.81 |
| Spain | | 3-0 | Italy | |
| Emilio Alzamora | 1:57.18 | 3-0 | Alessandro Gramigni | 2:11.34 (penalty) |
| Oriol Servià | 1:57.53 | 3-0 | Rinaldo Capello | 1:59.84 |
| Flavio Alonso | 1:56.96 | 3-0 | Renato Travaglia | 1:57.45 |

==== Group C ====
| Pos. | Team | Races | Wins | Losses | Total Time | Driver | Wins | Losses | Best Time |
|---|---|---|---|---|---|---|---|---|---|
| 1 | All-Stars | 6 | 4 | 2 | 5:55.38 | (France) Gilles Panizzi | 2 | 0 | 1:58.15 |
| 1 | All-Stars | 6 | 4 | 2 | 5:55.38 | (Brazil) Cristiano da Matta | 2 | 0 | 1:57.37 |
| 1 | All-Stars | 6 | 4 | 2 | 5:55.38 | (Spain) Fonsi Nieto | 0 | 2 | 1:59.86 |
| 2 | (United States) USA | 6 | 3 | 3 | 5:55.06 | Casey Mears | 0 | 2 | 1:59.92 |
| 2 | (United States) USA | 6 | 3 | 3 | 5:55.06 | Boris Said | 1 | 1 | 1:59.79 |
| 2 | (United States) USA | 6 | 3 | 3 | 5:55.06 | Travis Pastrana | 2 | 0 | 1:55.35 |
| 3 | Germany | 6 | 2 | 4 | 5:57.55 | Armin Kremer | 1 | 1 | 1:58.47 |
| 3 | Germany | 6 | 2 | 4 | 5:57.55 | Sven Heidfeld | 0 | 2 | 2:00.97 |
| 3 | Germany | 6 | 2 | 4 | 5:57.55 | Alex Hofmann | 1 | 1 | 1:58.11 |

| Team 1 | Time 1 | Score | Team 2 | Time 2 |
| (United States) USA | | 2-1 | Germany | |
|---|---|---|---|---|
| Travis Pastrana | 1:57.16 | 2-1 | Alex Hofmann | 2:01.41 |
| Boris Said | 2:03.04 | 2-1 | Sven Heidfeld | 2:03.25 |
| Casey Mears | 1:59.92 | 2-1 | Armin Kremer | 1:48.57 |
| Germany | | 1-2 | All-Stars | |
| Alex Hofmann | 1:58.11 | 1-2 | Fonsi Nieto | 1:59.86 |
| Sven Heidfeld | 2:00.97 | 1-2 | Cristiano da Matta | 1:59.25 |
| Armin Kremer | 1:58.74 | 1-2 | Gilles Panizzi | 1:58.15 |
| All-Stars | | 2-1 | USA | |
| Fonsi Nieto | 2:00.60 | 2-1 | Travis Pastrana | 1:55.35 |
| Cristiano da Matta | 1:57.37 | 2-1 | Boris Said | 1:59.79 |
| Gilles Panizzi | 1:58.18 | 2-1 | Casey Mears | 2:02.85 |

- USA progress to the semi-finals by having the fastest total time of the losing teams.

==== Best Times ====
| Pos. | Rally | | Racing | | Motorcycle | |
| | Driver | Best Time | Driver | Best Time | Driver | Best Time |
|---|---|---|---|---|---|---|
| 1 | (France) Sébastien Loeb | 1:56.05 | (Brazil) Cristiano da Matta | 1:57.37 | (United States) Travis Pastrana | 1:55.35 |
| 2 | (Sweden) Daniel Carlsson | 1:56.77 | (Spain) Oriol Servià | 1:57.53 | (Spain) Emilio Alzamora | 1:57.18 |
| 3 | (Spain) Flavio Alonso | 1:56.81 | (Finland) JJ Lehto | 1:59.32 | (Germany) Alex Hofmann | 1:58.11 |
| 4 | (Italy) Renato Travaglia | 1:56.92 | (United States) Boris Said | 1:59.79 | (Spain) Fonsi Nieto | 1:59.86 |
| 5 | (Finland) Timo Salonen | 1:57.69 | (Italy) Rinaldo Capello | 1:59.84 | (Finland) Samuli Aro | 1:59.91 |
| 6 | (United Kingdom) David Higgins | 1:57.72 | (France) Olivier Panis | 2:00.19 | (France) Randy de Puniet | 1:59.91 |
| 7 | (France) Gilles Panizzi | 1:58.15 | (Germany) Sven Heidfeld | 2:00.97 | (United Kingdom) James Toseland | 2:02.06 |
| 8 | (Germany) Armin Kremer | 1:58.47 | (Sweden) Björn Wirdheim | 2:01.13 | (Sweden) Tony Rickardsson | 2:02.70 |
| 9 | (United States) Casey Mears | 1:59.92 | (United Kingdom) Guy Smith | 2:03.73 | (Italy) Alessandro Gramigni | 2:03.97 |

=== Knockout stage ===
Semi-finals
Spain | 3
Sweden | 0
All-Stars | 3
USA | 2

Final
Spain | 2
All-Stars | 3

==== Semifinals ====
| Team 1 | Time 1 | Score | Team 2 | Time 2 |
| Spain | | 3-0 | Sweden | |
|---|---|---|---|---|
| Emilio Alzamora | 2:00.69 | 3-0 | Tony Rickardsson | 2:02.07 |
| Oriol Servià | 2:00.48 | 3-0 | Björn Wirdheim | 2:02.91 |
| Flavio Alonso | 1:54.58 | 3-0 | Daniel Carlsson | 1:55.45 |
| All-Stars | | 3–2 | United States | |
| Fonsi Nieto | DNF | 3–2 | Travis Pastrana | 2:28.61 |
| Cristiano da Matta | 1:59.51 | 3–2 | Boris Said | 2:00.30 |
| Gilles Panizzi | 1:53.88 | 3–2 | Casey Mears | 1:56.34 |
| Fonsi Nieto | 2:02.23 | 3–2 | Travis Pastrana | 1:56.59 |
| Cristiano da Matta | 1:57.75 | 3–2 | Boris Said | 2:00.61 |

==== Final ====
| Team 1 | Time 1 | Score | Team 2 | Time 2 |
| (Spain) | | 2-3 | All-Stars | |
|---|---|---|---|---|
| Emilio Alzamora | 1:58.15 | 2-3 | Fonsi Nieto | 2:02.42 |
| Oriol Servià | 1:59.30 | 2-3 | Cristiano da Matta | 1:58.45 |
| Flavio Alonso | 1:53.37 | 2-3 | Gilles Panizzi | 1:52.62 |
| Emilio Alzamora | 1:56.92 | 2-3 | Fonsi Nieto | 1:59.26 |
| Oriol Servià | 1:59.73 | 2-3 | Cristiano da Matta | 1:57.98 |

== Race of Champions ==
Participation in the main Race of Champions was awarded primarily on the basis of having the best times in the Nations' Cup. There were several exceptions to this rule however – Marcus Grönholm, as the defending champion, was guaranteed a spot, whilst Cristiano da Matta, despite having the best time among racing drivers in the Nations' Cup, did not participate. François Duval secured his place by winning the Junior event, Dani Sordo won the Spanish Masters event, Timo Salonen was an invited 'seeded' driver and Martin Rowe was invited for having won the 2003 PWRC title. Thomas Biagi meanwhile earned his place by beating FIA GT teammate Matteo Bobbi and Volkswagen Cup UK winner Rob Carvell.

=== Group stage ===
==== Group A ====
| Driver | Races | Wins | Losses | Best Time |
|---|---|---|---|---|
| (Italy) Renato Travaglia | 3 | 3 | 0 | 1:58.07 |
| (Spain) Dani Sordo | 3 | 1 | 2 | 2:03.68 |
| (Finland) Timo Salonen | 3 | 1 | 2 | 2:06.47 |
| (United Kingdom) Martin Rowe | 3 | 1 | 2 | 2:07.45 |

| Driver 1 | Time 1 | Driver 2 | Time 2 |
|---|---|---|---|
| (Spain) Dani Sordo | DNF | (Italy) Renato Travaglia | 1:58.07 |
| (United Kingdom) Martin Rowe | 2:07.45 | (Finland) Timo Salonen | 2:07.71 |
| (Finland) Timo Salonen | 2:06.47 | (Spain) Dani Sordo | 2:15 47 (penalty) |
| (Italy) Renato Travaglia | 2:04.27 | (United Kingdom) Martin Rowe | 2:05.80 |
| (Spain) Dani Sordo | 2:03.68 | (United Kingdom) Martin Rowe | 2:14.38 (penalty) |
| (Finland) Timo Salonen | 2:08.11 | (Italy) Renato Travaglia | 2:04.33 |

==== Group B ====
| Driver | Races | Wins | Losses | Best Time |
|---|---|---|---|---|
| (Spain) Flavio Alonso | 3 | 3 | 0 | 1:54.50 |
| (Spain) Oriol Servià | 3 | 2 | 1 | 1:54.03 |
| (Spain) Emilio Alzamora | 3 | 1 | 2 | 1:56.67 |
| (Italy) Thomas Biagi | 3 | 0 | 3 | 1:56.77 |

| Driver 1 | Time 1 | Driver 2 | Time 2 |
|---|---|---|---|
| (Spain) Oriol Servià | 1:55.71 | (Spain) Emilio Alzamora | 1:59.99 |
| (Italy) Thomas Biagi | 2:02.72 | (Spain) Flavio Alonso | 1:57.05 |
| (Spain) Flavio Alonso | 1:54.84 | (Spain) Oriol Servià | 1:55.64 |
| (Spain) Emilio Alzamora | 1:56.67 | (Italy) Thomas Biagi | 2:07.61 (penalty) |
| (Spain) Emilio Alzamora | 1:54.53 | (Spain) Flavio Alonso | 1:54.50 |
| (Spain) Oriol Servià | 1:54.03 | (Italy) Thomas Biagi | 1:56.77 |

=== Knockout stage ===
Quarter-finals
(France) Sébastien Loeb | 2
(Sweden) Daniel Carlsson | 0
(Spain) Flavio Alonso | 0
(Belgium) François Duval | 2
(Finland) Marcus Grönholm | 1
(United States) Travis Pastrana | 0
(France) Gilles Panizzi | 2
(Italy) Renato Travaglia | 0

Semi-finals
(France) Sébastien Loeb | 2
(Belgium) François Duval | 0
(Finland) Marcus Grönholm | 2
(France) Gilles Panizzi | 1

Final
(France) Sébastien Loeb | 2
(Finland) Marcus Grönholm | 0

==== Quarterfinals ====
| Driver 1 | Time 1 | Driver 2 | Time 2 |
|---|---|---|---|
| (France) Sébastien Loeb | 1:56.96 | (Sweden) Daniel Carlsson | 1:57.90 |
| (France) Sébastien Loeb | 1:51.67 | (Sweden) Daniel Carlsson | 1:52.38 |
| (Spain) Flavio Alonso | 1:57.13 | (Belgium) François Duval | 1:57.03 |
| (Spain) Flavio Alonso | 1:52.30 | (Belgium) François Duval | 1:52.05 |
| (Finland) Marcus Grönholm | 1:56.51 | (United States) Travis Pastrana | 2:37.21 |
| (France) Gilles Panizzi | 1:58.21 | (Italy) Renato Travaglia | 1:58.57 |
| (France) Gilles Panizzi | 1:53.60 | (Italy) Renato Travaglia | 1:53.67 |

==== Semifinals ====
| Driver 1 | Time 1 | Driver 2 | Time 2 |
|---|---|---|---|
| (France) Sébastien Loeb | 1:56.55 | (Belgium) François Duval | 1:56.60 |
| (France) Sébastien Loeb | 1:51.85 | (Belgium) François Duval | 1:52.30 |
| (Finland) Marcus Grönholm | 1:57.07 | (France) Gilles Panizzi | 1:57.64 |
| (Finland) Marcus Grönholm | 1:53.53 | (France) Gilles Panizzi | 1:53.46 |
| (Finland) Marcus Grönholm | 1:52.18 | (France) Gilles Panizzi | 1:53.05 |

==== Final ====
| Driver 1 | Time 1 | Driver 2 | Time 2 |
|---|---|---|---|
| (France) Sébastien Loeb | 1:56.15 | (Finland) Marcus Grönholm | 1:56.45 |
| (France) Sébastien Loeb | 1:52.30 | (Finland) Marcus Grönholm | 1:53.09 |
