= Jacky Vimond =

French motorcycle racer

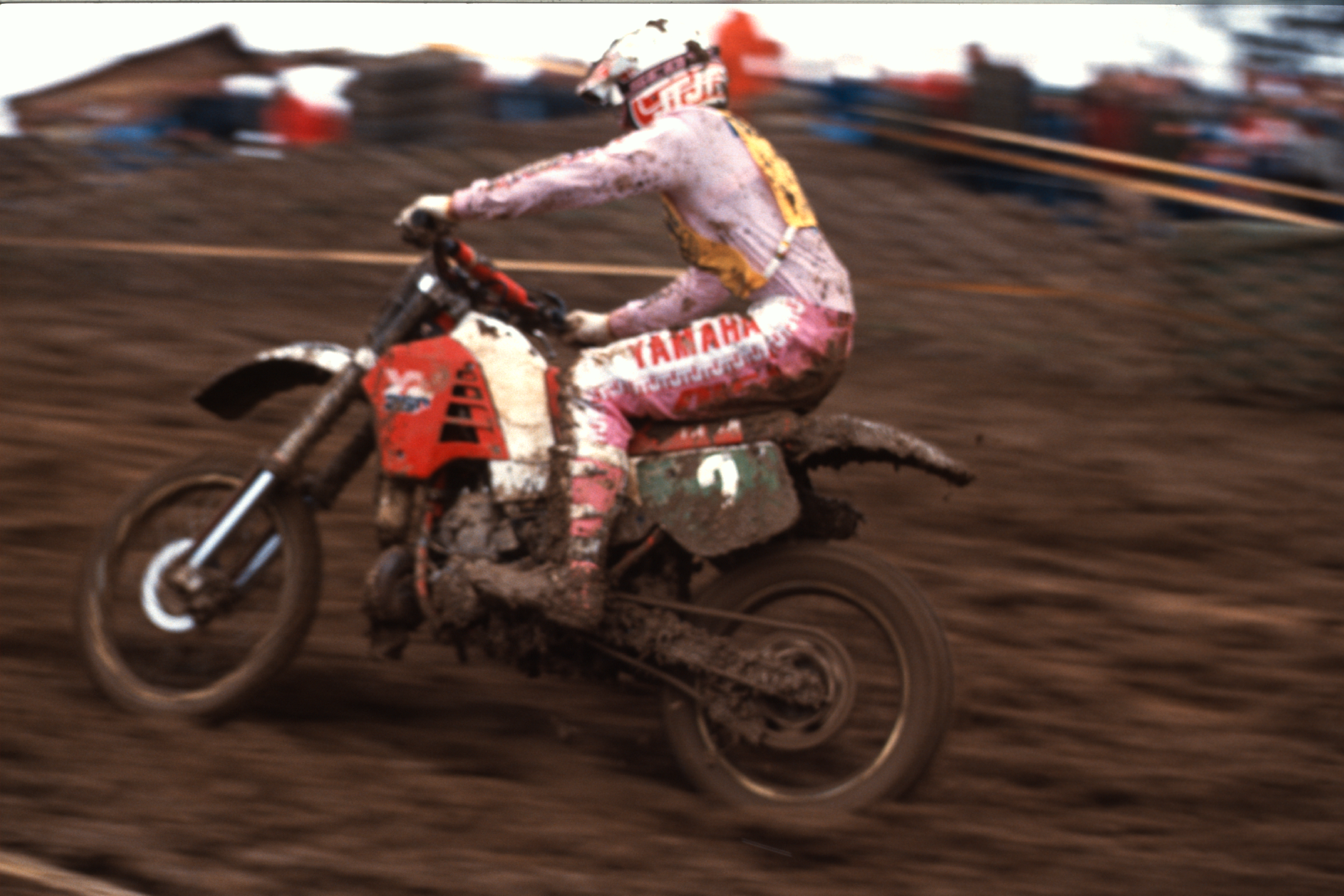
- Jacky Vimond on his bike, 1986
- Nationality: French
- Born: 18 July 1961 (age 65) Saint Tribehou, Manche (Normandy), France

Motocross career
- Years active: 1979 - 1988
- Teams: Yamaha
- Championships: 250cc - 1986
- Wins: 13

Jacky Vimond (born 18 July 1961) is a French former professional motocross racer. He competed in the Motocross World Championships from 1979 to 1988. Vimond is notable for being the first French competitor to win an FIM motocross world championship. In 2016, he was named an FIM Legend for his motorcycling achievements.

== Motocross career ==
Vimond was born in Saint Tribehou (Manche), Normandy, France. He made his motocross world championship debut in 1979 and competed in the 125cc class for the next four seasons riding a Yamaha but, was plagued by injuries and a sixth place in the 1982 125cc World Championship would be his best result in the smaller class.

In 1984, Vimond moved up to the 250cc motocross world championship still riding for Yamaha. He won his first Grand Prix race at the 1984 250cc Swiss Grand Prix and, finished the season ranked second to Heinz Kinigadner in the 250cc world championship. He won three Grand Prix races in 1985, including the last two races of the season to once again secure second place in the 250cc world championship, just two points behind Kinigadner.

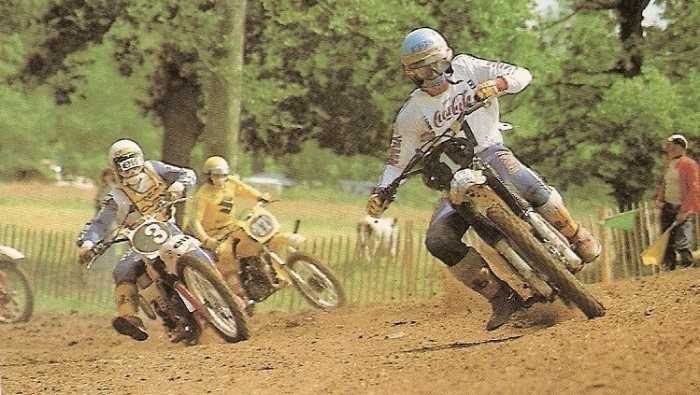
Vimond (#1) competing in a French national race in 1980.

Vimond won seven out of twelve Grand Prix races in the 1986 season to claim the 250cc motocross world championship, becoming France's first-ever motocross world champion. Vimond was badly injured at a victory celebration in honor of his world championship. As he was being lowered by wires to the stage while astride his motorcycle, something went wrong and he fell almost nine meters, breaking his back.

After recovering from his injuries, Vimond moved up to the premier 500cc motocross world championship in 1987. Although he won the 1988 Swedish 500cc Grand Prix and finished the 1988 season ranked fifth in the 500cc world championship, he was never able to perform at his previous performance level after his injury at his 1986 championship victory celebration.

When Yamaha withdrew their motocross racing program in 1989, Vimond competed in the 500cc motocross world championship on a privateer Honda but, the machine was not competitive and he ended the season ranked 13th in the final standings. He returned to the 250cc motocross world championship in 1990 riding a Suzuki but, persistent injuries forced him to announce his retirement from competition.

After his retirement, Vimond became a motocross coach, helping young riders such as Sebastien Tortelli, Stephane Roncada, David Vuillemin and Romain Febvre.
