= Tribehou =

- Commune
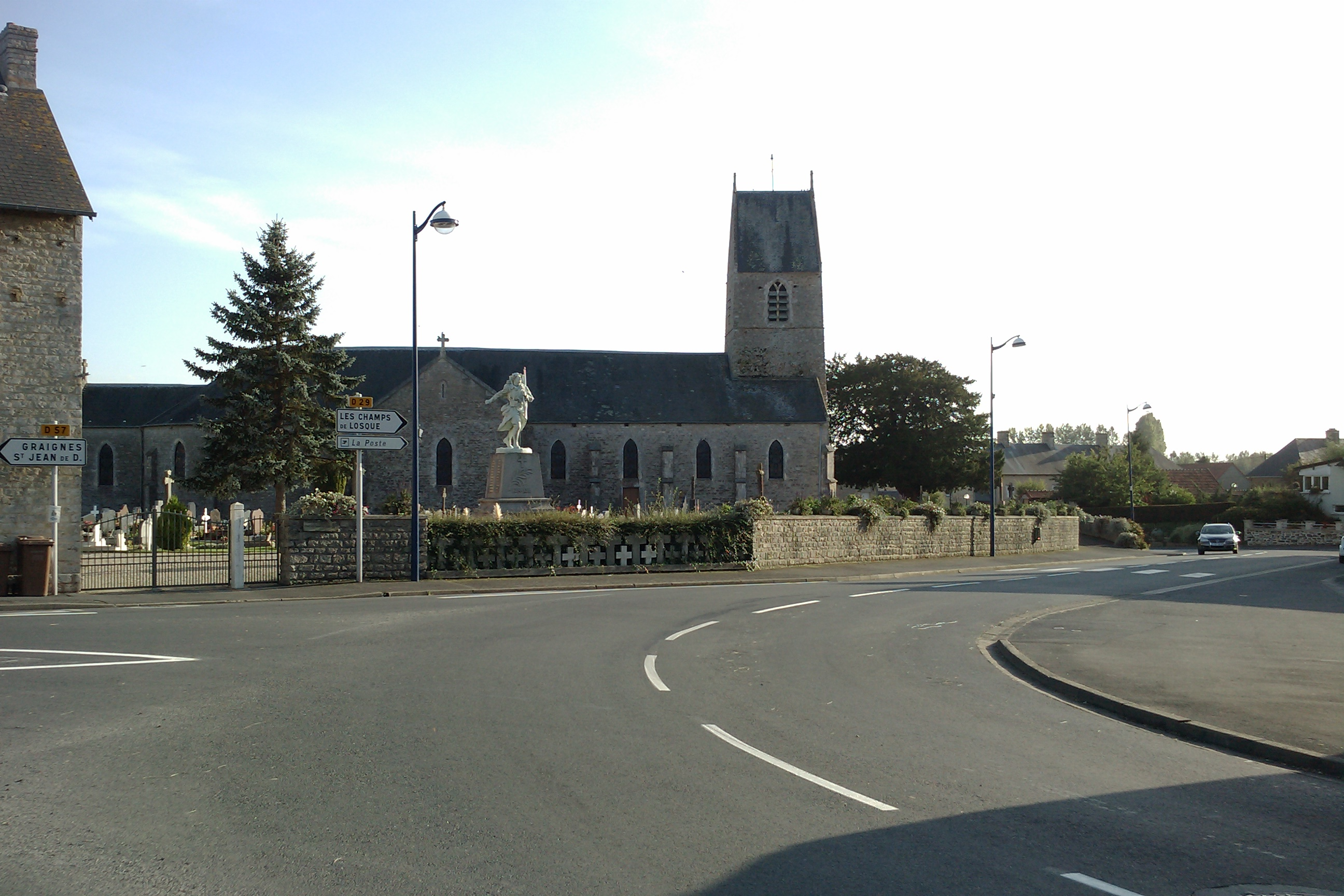
- Tribehou and the church of Notre-Dame
- Location of Tribehou
- Location within France Location within Normandy
- Coordinates: 49°12′52″N 1°14′34″W
- Country: France
- Region: Normandy
- Department: Manche
- Arrondissement: Saint-Lô
- Canton: Pont-Hébert
- Intercommunality: Baie du Cotentin

Government
  - Mayor (2020–2026): Gérard Charrault
- Area^{1}: 9.97 km^{2} (3.85 sq mi)
- Elevation: 10 m (33 ft)
- Highest elevation: 24 m (79 ft)
- Lowest elevation: 0 m (0 ft)
- Population (2023): 525
  - Density: 52.7/km^{2} (136/sq mi)
- Time zone: UTC+01:00 (CET)
  - Summer (DST): UTC+02:00 (CEST)
- INSEE/Postal code: 50606 /50620
- ^{1} French Land Register data, which excludes lakes, ponds, glaciers > 1 km^{2} (0.386 sq mi or 247 acres) and river estuaries.

Tribehou (French pronunciation: [tʁibu]) is a commune in the Manche department in Normandy in north-western France.

== See also ==
- Communes of the Manche department
