= Flavio Alonso =

Spanish rally driver (born 1968)

Personal information
- Nationality: (Spain) Spanish

World Rally Championship record
- Years active: 1999
- Rallies: 1
- Championships: 0
- Rally wins: 0
- Podiums: 0
- Stage wins: 0
- Total points: 0
- First rally: 1999 Rally de Catalunya

Flavio Alonso (born May 11, 1968) is a Spanish rally driver. He is best known for participating in the Race of Champions during the event's tenure at Gran Canaria, the highlight being winning the 'Rally Masters' contest in 1992 and 1996. He also represented Spain alongside Oriol Servia and Emilio Alzamora at the 2003 event, losing in the final to the 'All-Star' team. He also reached the quarter-finals of the main event that year, but was beaten by François Duval.

He has competed sporadically in the Spanish Rally Championship and the European Rally Championship, and also participated in the Spanish round of the 1999 World Rally Championship.

Sporting positions
Preceded by Josep Maria Bardolet	Race of Champions; Rally Master; 1992	Succeeded by Stig Blomqvist
Preceded by Andrea Aghini	Race of Champions; Rally Master; 1996	Succeeded by Jarmo Kytolehto
