= Patrick Perrier =

France international rugby union player

- Born: 20 January 1957 Bayonne, France
- Died: 22 July 2015 (aged 58) Bidarray, France
- Height: 5 ft 10 in (178 cm)
- Weight: 182 lb (83 kg)

Rugby union career
- Position: Centre
International career
Years	Team	Apps	(Points)
1982	France	4	(0)

Patrick Perrier (20 January 1957 – 22 July 2015) was a French international rugby union player.

A native of Bayonne, Perrier was a centre and played his rugby at Aviron Bayonnais, with which he contested one French Championship final. He was capped four times by France, playing all matches in the 1982 Five Nations.

Perrier, a physical education teacher by profession, was reported missing after going hiking near Bidarray on 21 July 2015. A search party found his body the next morning at the edge of a 15-metre cliff.

== See also ==
- List of France national rugby union players
