= Métisse Motorcycles =

British motorcycle manufacturer

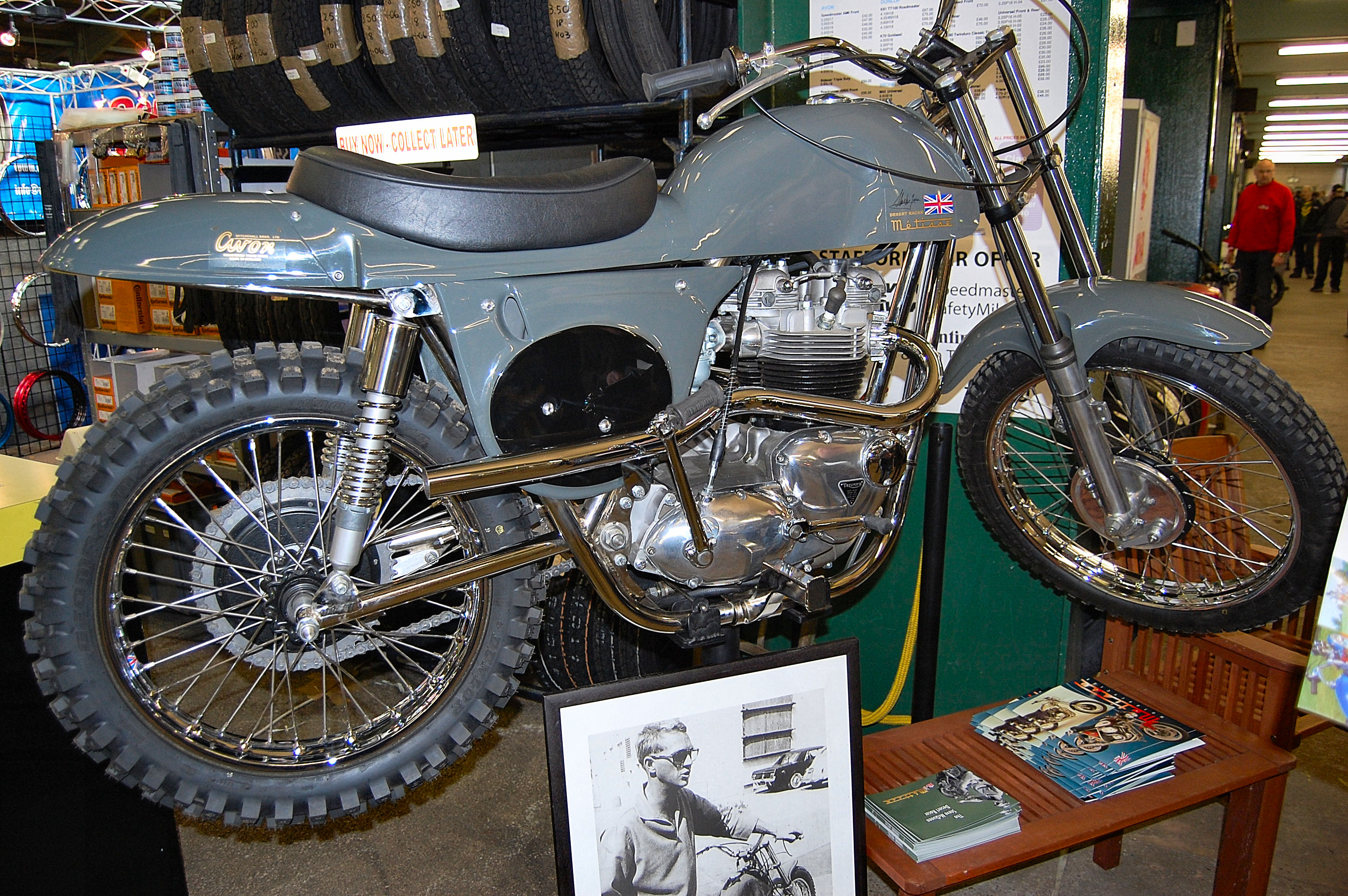
Métisse Steve McQueen Desert Racer

Métisse Motorcycles is a British low-volume manufacturer of specialist motorcycles and motorcycle frames based in Carswell near Faringdon, Oxfordshire.

Since 1982, Métisse has produced motorcycle frame kits for British bike engines. Former owner Pat French bought the tooling originally used by the Rickman brothers (who produced the first Mk1 Metisse in 1959) to produce lightweight, strong frames and rolling chassis for competitive motocross use.

Métisse has focused on using high quality plated steel for their distinctive frames. French produced Mk IV frames, then MkIII for retro-scrambles until the mid-1990s when demand waned. A partnership was formed with Gerry Lisi to continue manufacture until French's retirement. French died in 2007. Lisi continues to run Métisse at his Carswell premises where the motorcycle operation is something of a sideline to the main golf course business.

Métisse now manufactures complete motorcycles, usually using bought-in cycle parts and engines, although the recent Mk5 is fitted with Métisse's own 997 cc (60.8 cu in) air and oil-cooled 360° parallel twin engine.

== Steve McQueen Desert Racer ==
A limited edition of 300 complete motorcycles, the Steve McQueen Métisse Desert Racer, is a replica of the motorcycle raced by actor Steve McQueen in 1966 and 1967. The Desert Racer uses a fully reconditioned original Meriden Triumph unit construction 650 cc 6T engine. McQueen's actual bike had a Métisse frame and was built by his friend, the actor and stuntman Bud Ekins.

== Métisse Hammer Mk3 ==
Similar to the Desert Racer, the Hammer is a version of the Métisse Mk3 Scrambler that was the iconic motorcycle used by Ilya Kuryakin in the TV series "The Man from U.N.C.L.E.".

== Métisse Mk5 ==
The firm's most complete product is the Métisse Mk5, a bespoke retro-styled roadster. The Mk5 has not only a Métisse frame, but a new "Adelaide" 8-valve 997 cc (60.8 cu in) air-&-oil-cooled 5-speed 360° parallel twin engine designed and manufactured in-house by Métisse. The Mk5 is a hand-crafted motorcycle and the riding position is adjusted to the customer's dimensions. The firm provides the buyer with a portfolio with images of the bike during its build, along with documentation of its particular specification.

The Mk5 is available either as a "Café Racer" (with or without a nose fairing) or as a "Street Scrambler". The bike has a 4130 chrome-moly cradle frame with 41mm non-adjustable Ceriani forks and twin Öhlins rear shocks. The engine produces claimed 97 hp (72 kW) and claimed 70 lb⋅ft (95 N⋅m) of torque with a top speed of 120 mph (190 km/h). Front brakes are twin 320 mm discs with Brembo caliper, while the rear is a single 220 mm disc, also with a Brembo calliper. The 2010 prototype, with a dry weight of 180 kg was styled as a "Street Scrambler", is now in production.
