= Rickman Motorcycles =

UK automobile manufacturer

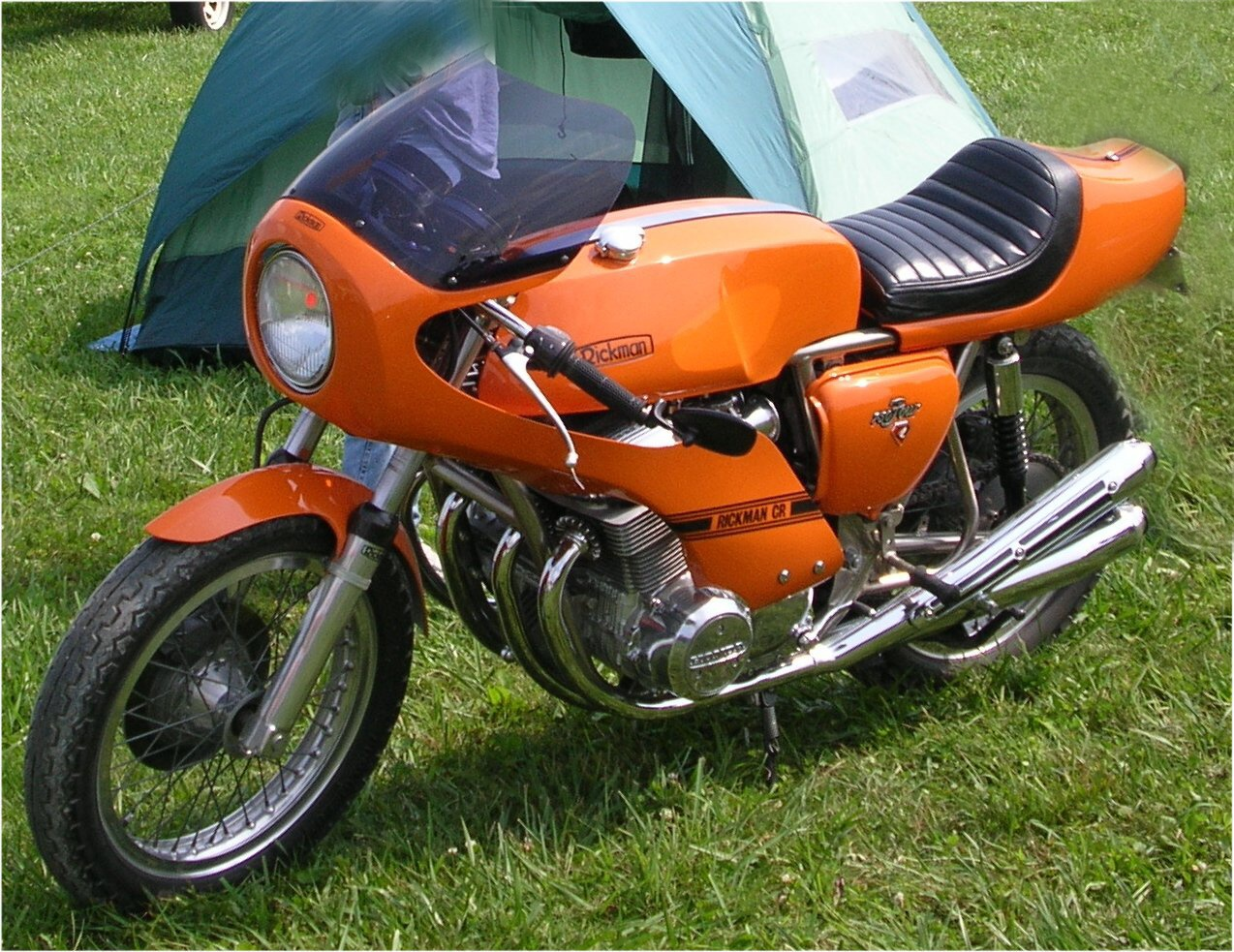
Rickman Honda CR750

Rickman Motorcycles was a British, independent motorcycle chassis constructor established by brothers Derek and Don Rickman. The firm manufactured motorcycles from 1960 (65 years ago) until 1975 (50 years ago).

== History ==
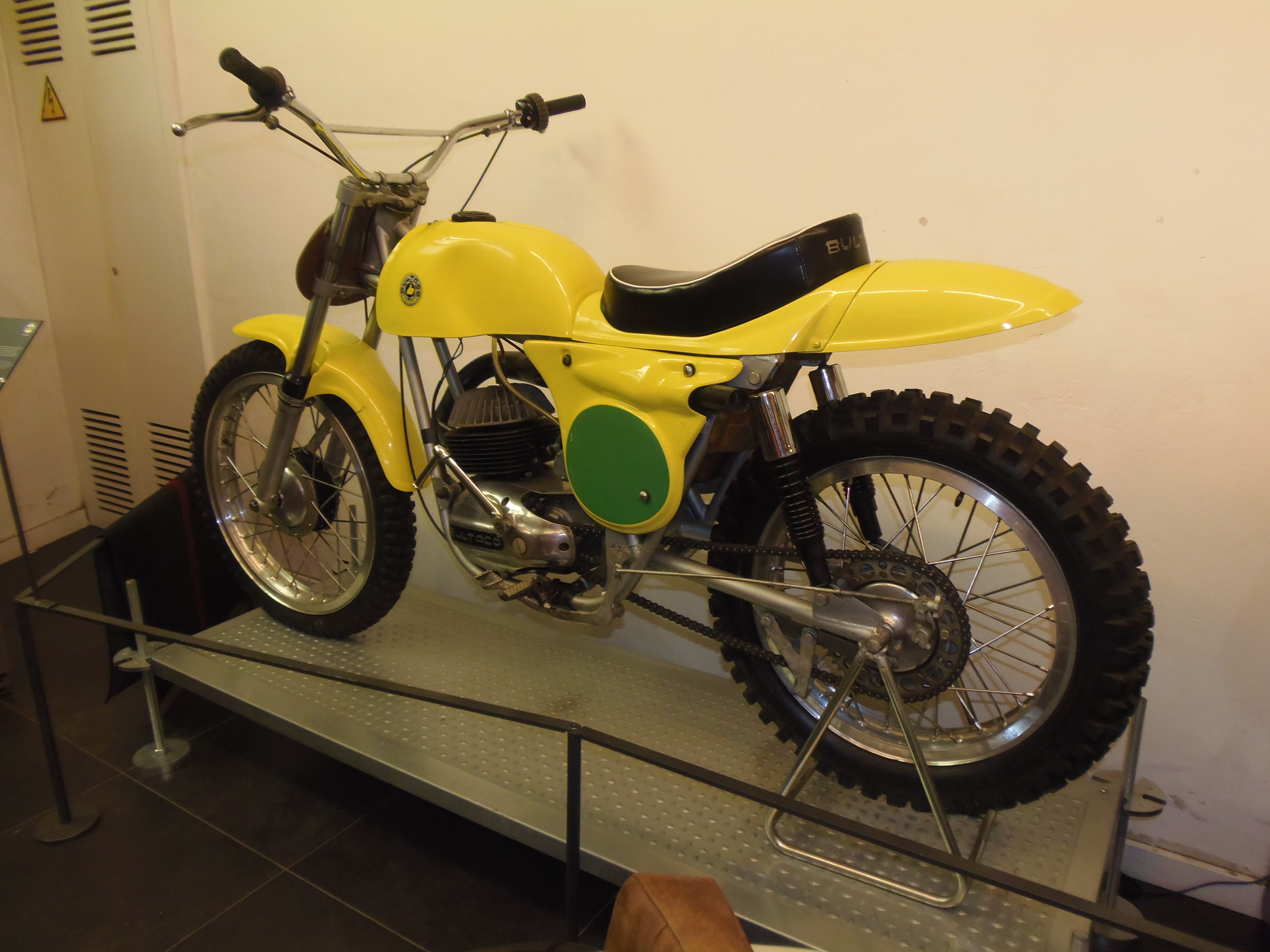
Bultaco Metisse with Spanish engine first offered complete in 1964 by Rickman Motorcycles

Initially the frame designs were for scrambles, and then for road racing. Later, in 1966, road bikes were produced as well. The first street legal bike used a Triumph Bonneville engine. Rickman initially supplied frame kits to the public, as no major British motorcycle manufacturers would sell engines separately. The frame kits were built for many engines, including Triumph twins, BSA singles and Matchless. In the mid-1960s, Rickman also produced road-racing frames for AJS 7R singles, and in the 1970s they began selling chassis kits for Japanese bikes like the Honda CB750 and Kawasaki Z1. The road bikes were the first to use disc brakes both front and rear (a joint project with Lockheed).

Other innovations included the use of large diameter telescopic forks (1-5/8" or 41.2mm) and oil carried in the frame tubes to help dissipate heat and save weight. An eight valve cylinder head conversion (700cc) for Triumph 650cc twins was developed in the late 1960s which considerably increased power output (up to 60 bhp or more depending on state of tune) and showed up some weaknesses in the Triumph crankcases and connecting rods. Chain adjustment was via eccentric discs rather than drawbolts to avoid misalignment.

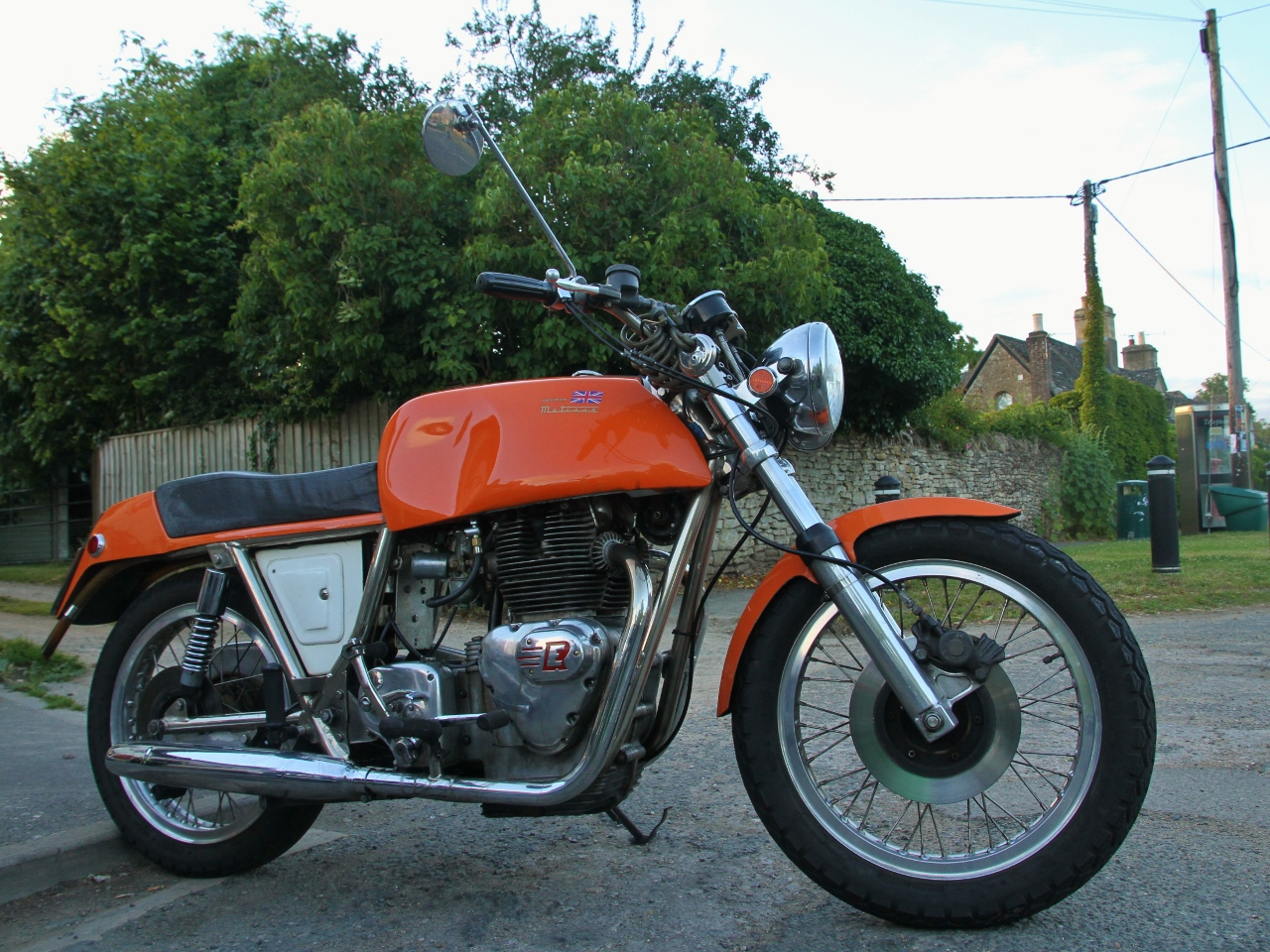
Rickman with Royal Enfield Interceptor Series 2 engine

In 1970 the Royal Enfield factory closed, leaving a batch of about 200 Interceptor Series II 736cc engines stranded. Floyd Clymer had ordered them for export to the United States, where he planned to install them in motorcycles that he would sell under the Indian brand. However, in January 1970 Clymer died, and the project died with him. His export agents, Mitchell's of Birmingham, offered the engines to the Rickman brothers, who used them to build a limited series of 137 Rickman Interceptors.

In about 1971, Rickman began producing complete motorcycles with engines of three sizes: 100 cc, 125 cc, and 250 cc. The 100s had Japanese Hodaka engines, the 125s had German Zundapp engines, while the 250s had Spanish Montesa engines. Many of these little Motocross bikes were produced from 1971 to 1975, most being shipped to America.

In 1974, Rickman was awarded the Queen's Award to Industry for their export business which achieved £1 million sales to the US each year, but it was the same year Norton Villiers Triumph collapsed. The Rickman brothers turned their attention to larger Japanese motorcycle engines, and produced Rickman Honda 750s, Rickman Kawasaki Z1/Z900s, Rickman Honda Bol d'Or 10th century, Rickman Kawasaki Z1000s, and Rickman Suzuki GS1000s.

The bikes or frame kits were known for their beautiful fibreglass work and nickel-plated frames and are often referred to as "Metisse" frames, a term used for their own first effort. The Rickmans had a sense of humour. Google translates the word politely as "mongrel".

The company stopped producing complete motorcycles in 1975, continuing to produce accessories. In the 1980s the Rickmans sold their parts to a company called MRD (Model, Replica & Design until then specialising in model aeroplanes). 'MRD Metisse' was born, and run by Pat French, a Rickman Metisse enthusiast. Business was good throughout the late '80s but the early '90s saw a levelling off of the business. In 1999 a new enthusiast arrived on the scene and set up a new company (Métisse Motorcycles) and bought Pat French's business including some later parts and the rights to use the word 'Metisse'.

Throughout this period another Rickman enthusiast, successful scrambler and friend of the Rickman's Adrian Moss was the first to spot that the Mark III would be the most popular model over time. Adrian was already building and racing Rickman bikes and spares. He set up the successful British Bike Bonanza in 1981, for pre-65 machines and enthusiasts, which is still going, to this day. The company name was also licensed to Adrian, and later passed to him, enabling the production of genuine Rickman Motorcycles to continue as they always had done.

Derek and Don Rickman were inducted into the A.M.A. Motorcycle Hall of Fame in 2007. Derek Rickman died in July 2021.

== Kit cars ==
By 1985, before the Rickman brothers retired, Rickman Engineering Limited diversified into general engineering and into the production of a kit car for amateur constructors to create four wheeled vehicles, namely the Rickman Ranger, with GFRP body version similar to Suzuki Jeep, and the Metisse sports coupe, based on donor-vehicle mechanicals, individually builder-sourced. Rickman, and later by the Lomax Company, produced over 1000 vehicles. The Ranger was later produced in Russia by Avtokam who produced the entire vehicle.

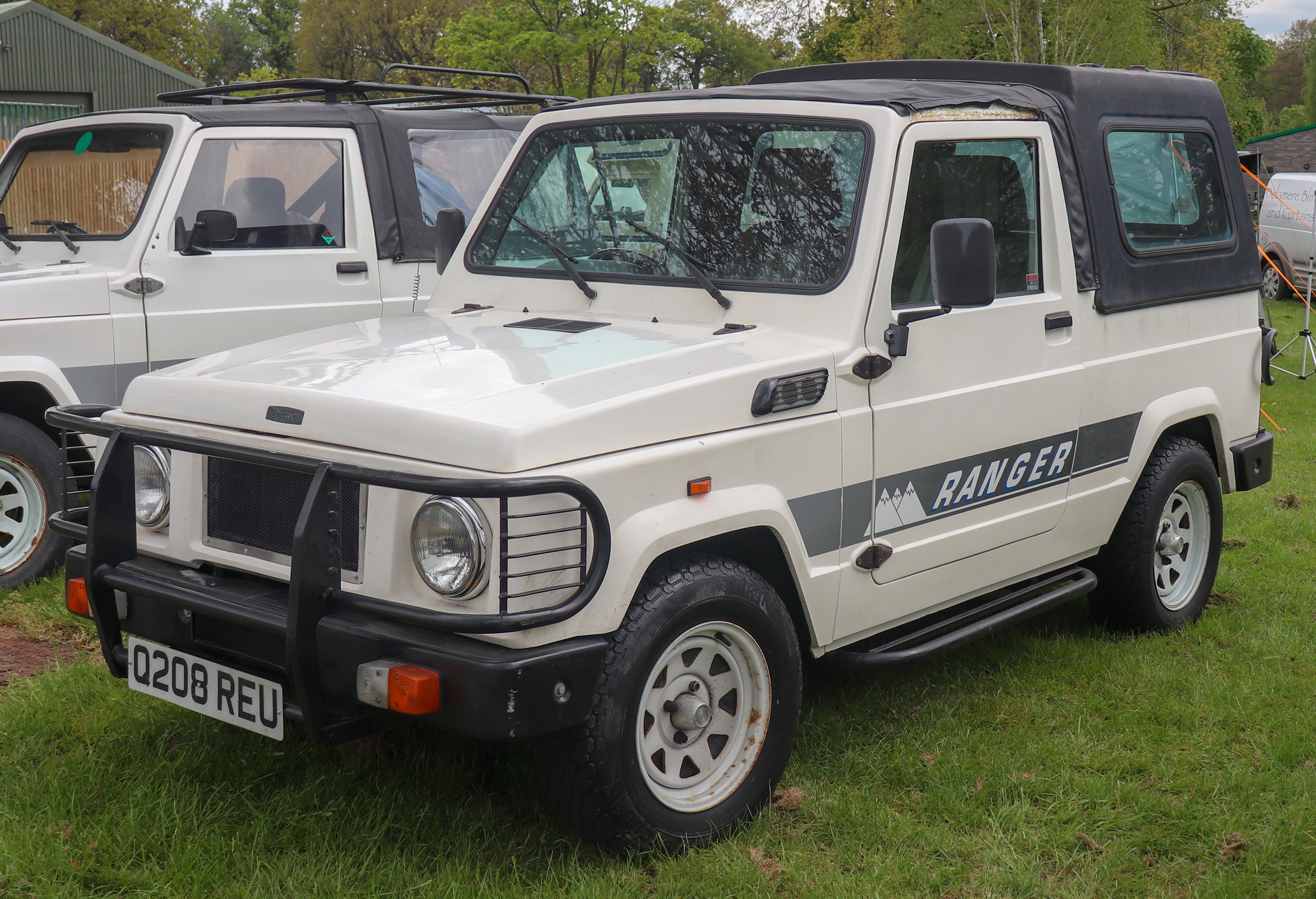
Rickman Ranger Softop

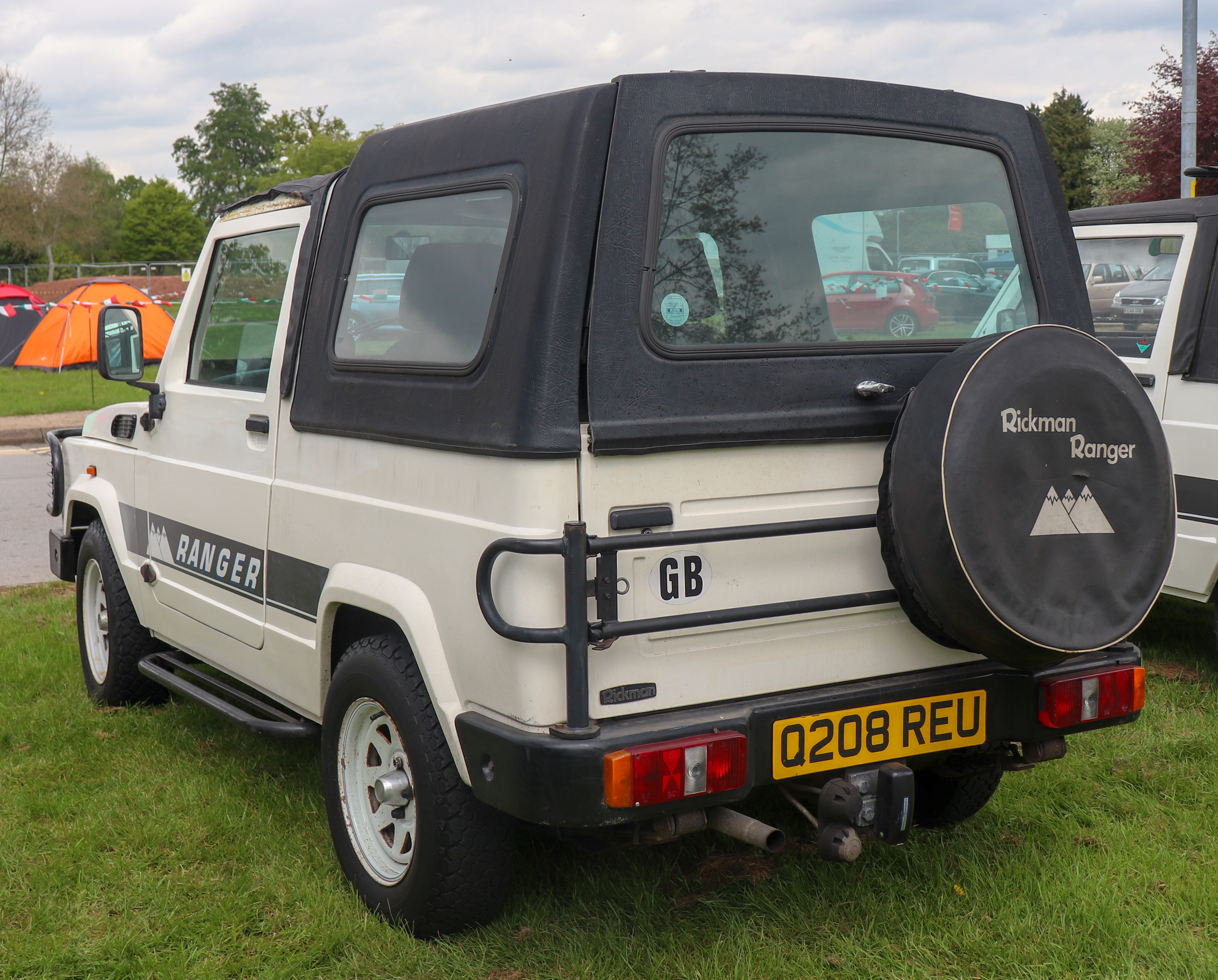
Rickman Ranger Softop

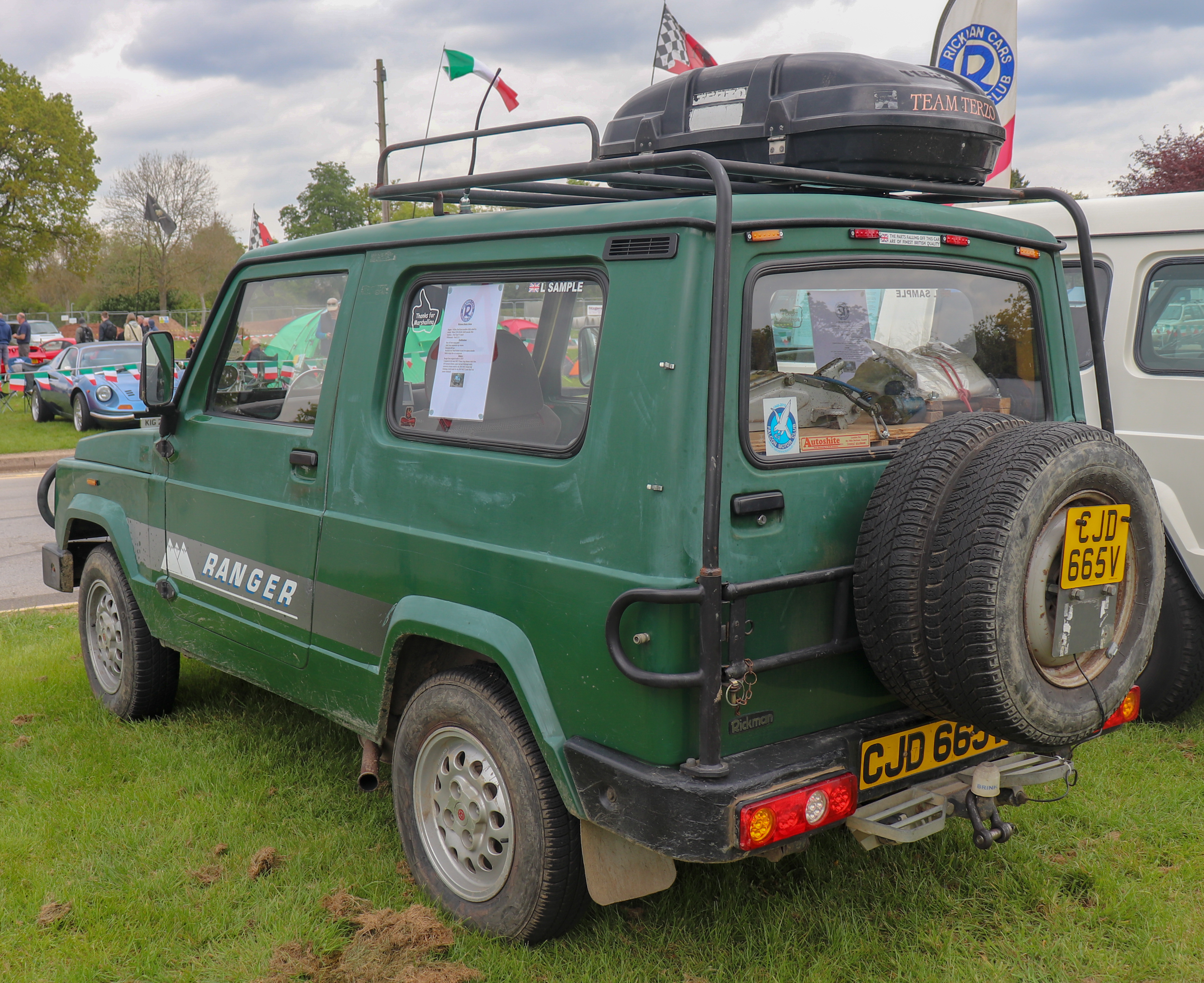
Rickman Ranger Hardtop

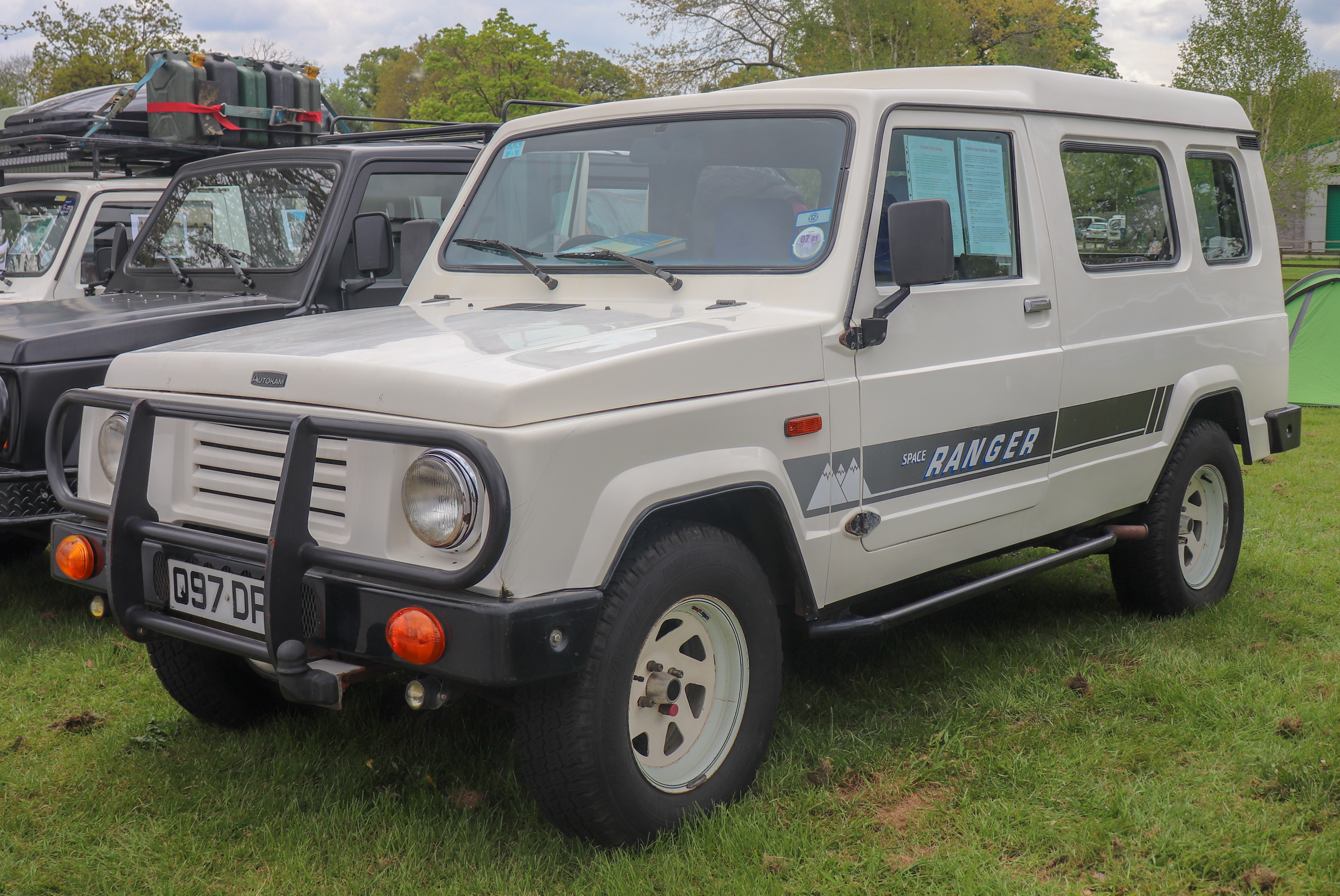
Rickman Space Ranger

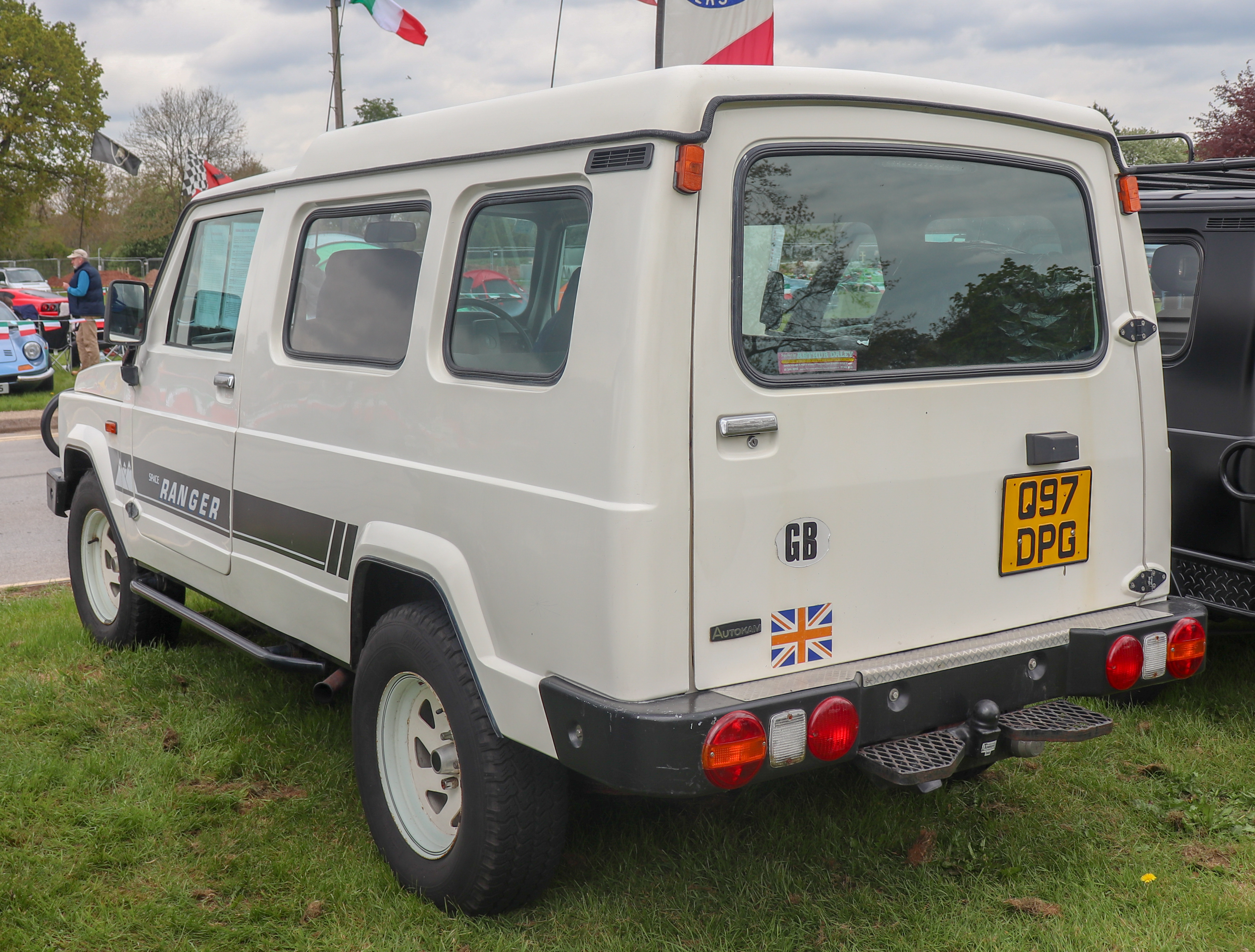
Rickman Space Ranger

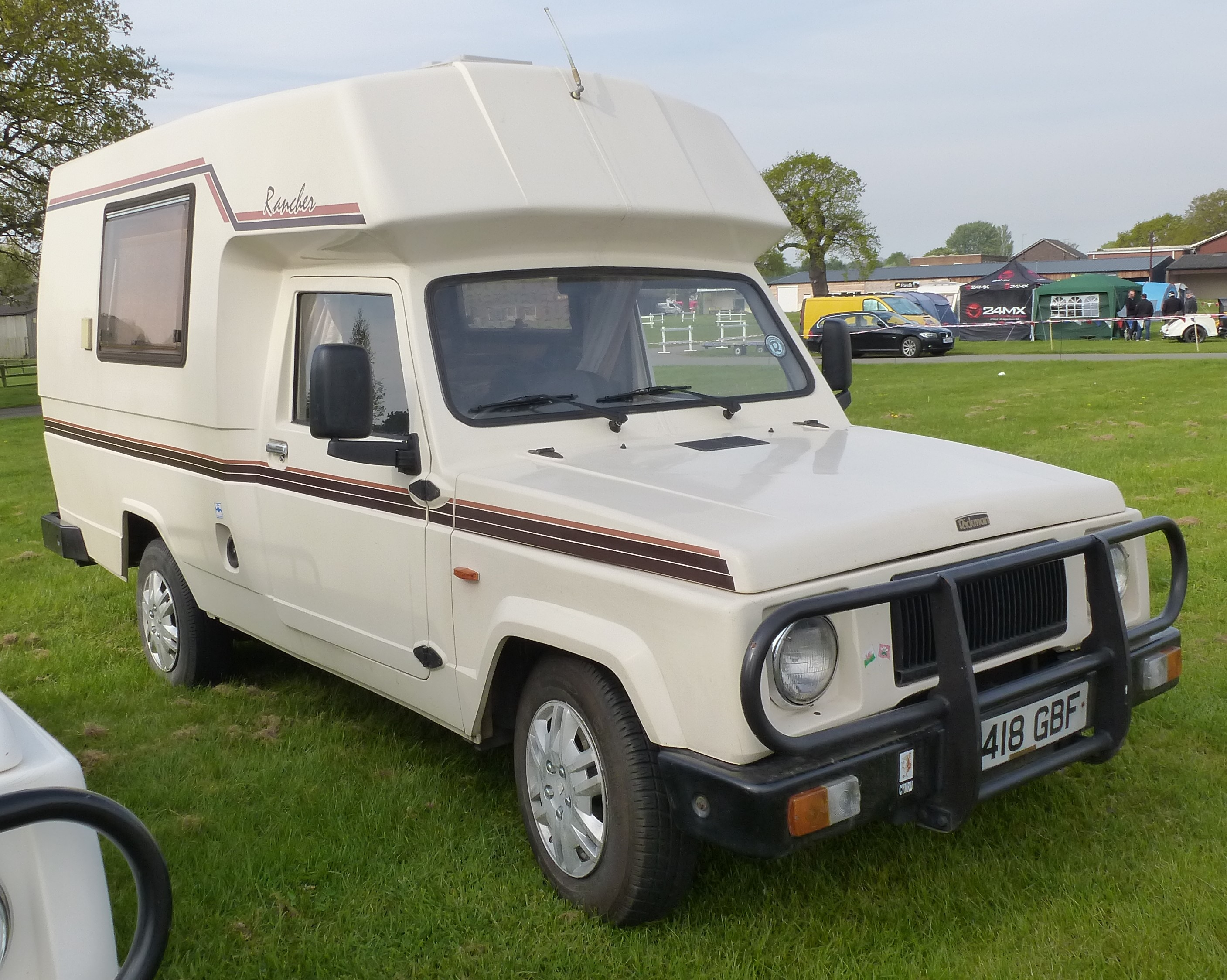
Rickman Rancher

== See also ==
- Métisse Motorcycles
- Avtokam
