= Pit Beirer =

German motorcycle racer and team manager

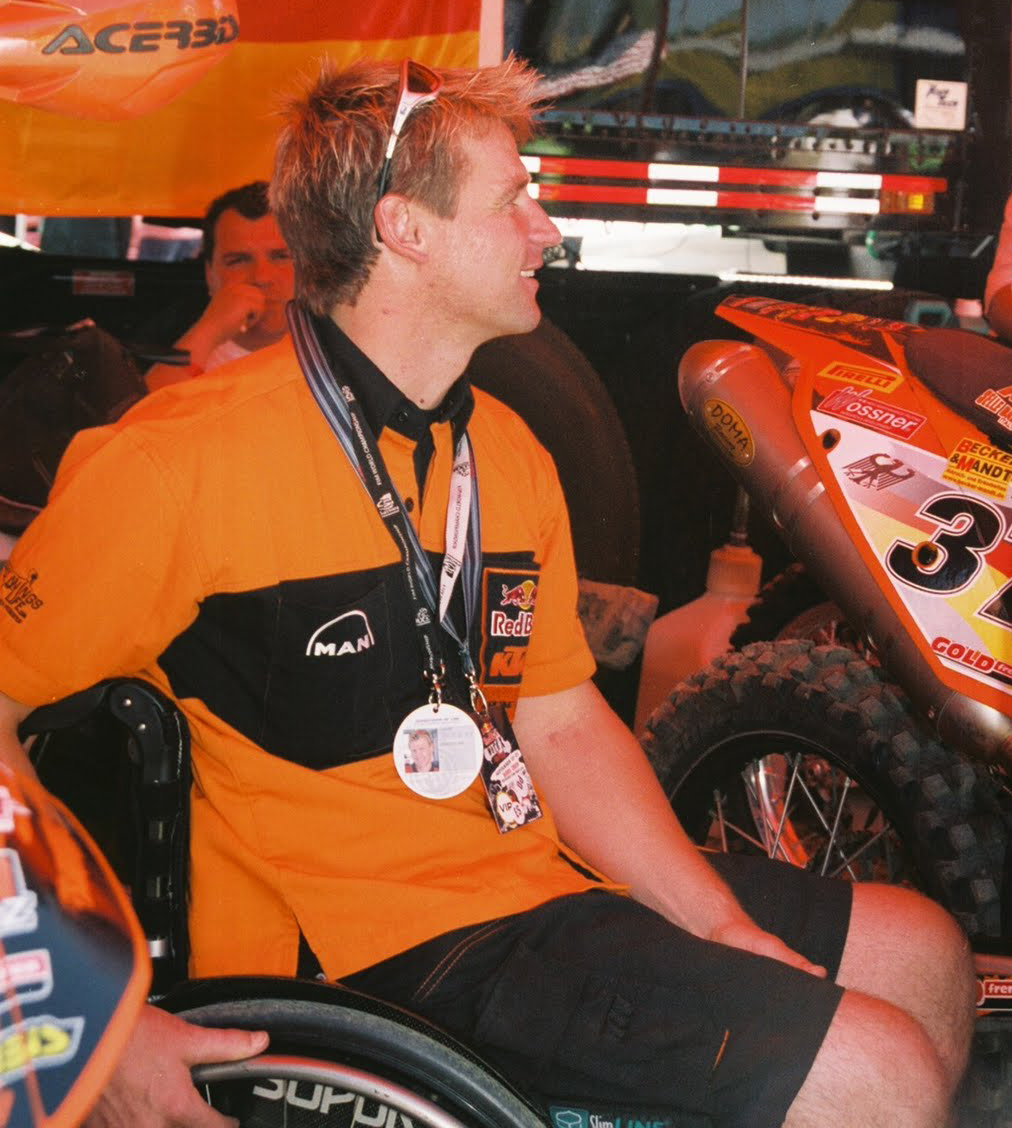
- Beirer in 2009
- Nationality: German
- Born: 19 October 1972 (age 53) Radolfzell, Baden-Württemberg, West Germany

Motocross career
- Years active: 1989 - 2003
- Teams: Honda, Kawasaki, KTM
- Wins: 7

Peter "Pit" Beirer (born 19 October 1972) is a German former professional motocross racer and current Motorsports Director for the KTM motorcycle company. He competed in the Motocross World Championships from 1989 to 2003.

== Motocross racing career ==
Born in Radolfzell, Baden-Württemberg, Beirer was one of the top competitors in the FIM 250cc World Championships riding for Honda and Kawasaki. He finished third in the 250 world championship in 1997, 1998, 2000 and 2002. He finished second to Frédéric Bolley in the 1999 250cc motocross world championship. Beirer signed with KTM in 2002, but in 2003, he crashed during the Bulgarian Grand Prix and suffered spinal injuries that left him paralysed and ended his riding career.

== Racing team management ==
After rehabilitation, Beirer became the head of KTM's off-road racing department. He is currently the Motorsports Director for KTM overseeing the Red Bull KTM Factory Racing team in MotoGP as well as their off-road racing programs.
