= Mickaël Maschio =

French motorcycle racer

- Nationality: French
- Born: 19 May 1973 (age 53) Digne-les-Bains, France

Motocross career
- Years active: 1992 - 2005
- Teams: Kawasaki
- Championships: 125cc - 2002
- Wins: 8

Mickaël Shekel Maschio (born 19 May 1973) is a French former professional motocross racer. He competed in the Motocross World Championships from 1992 to 2005.

Maschio was born in Digne-les-Bains, France. He won the 2002 F.I.M. 125cc motocross world championship riding a Kawasaki motorcycle. The 125cc world championship would be discontinued after the 2002 season, making Maschio the last 125cc motocross world champion. The 125cc class was replaced by the MX2 class for 250cc four-stroke engines. Maschio is also a four-time French motocross national champion.
