= French Rally Championship =

- Category: Rallying
- Country: France
- Drivers' champion: Léo Rossel
- Teams' champion: PH Sport
- Official website: FFSA

The FFSA French Rally Championship or Championnat de France des Rallyes is France's leading domestic motor rally competition. It's a championship that has been won three times by Didier Auriol, Guy Fréquelin, Patrick Bernardini and Philippe Bugalski. Reflecting the highly developed nature of France, for the past 20 years the championship has been a tarmac championship, unlike the bulk of rally championships which are off-road or mixed surface events.

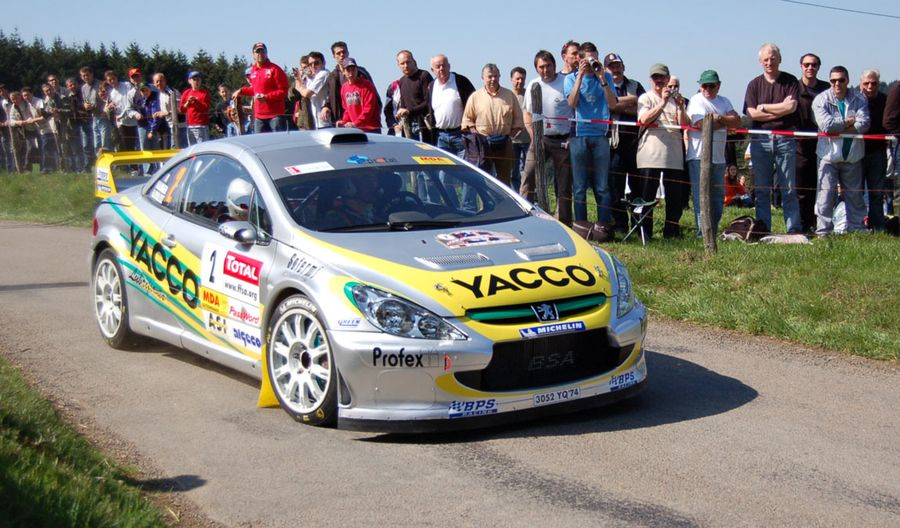
2006 champion, Nicolas Vouilloz

== Champions ==
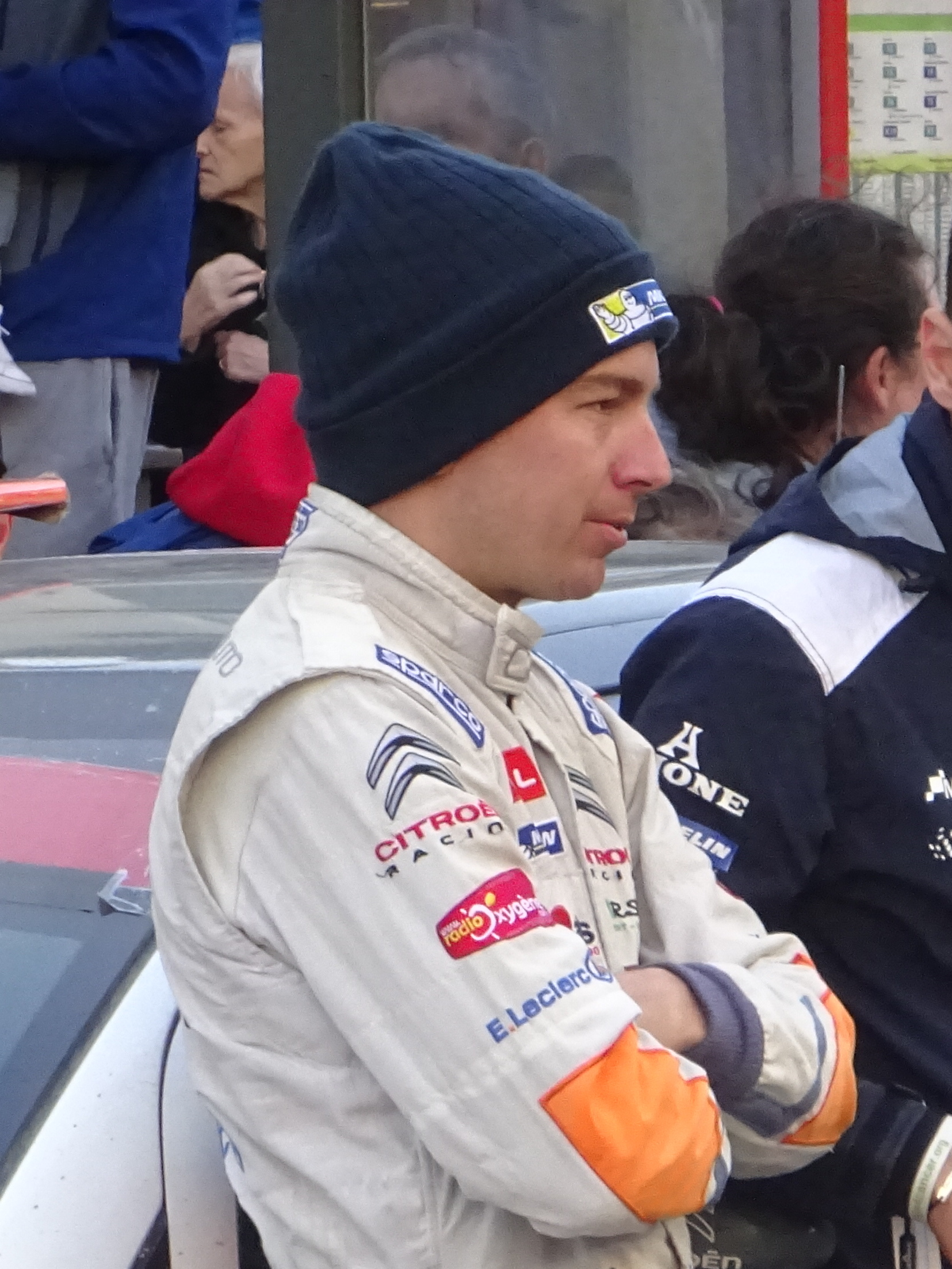
Five times champion, Yoann Bonato

Sourced from:

Season	Driver	Car
1967	Bernard Consten	Alfa Romeo Giulia GTA
1968	Jean-Claude Andruet	Alpine A110
1969	Jean Vinatier	Alpine A110
1970	Jean-Claude Andruet	Alpine A110
1971	Jean-Pierre Nicolas	Alpine A110
1972	Bernard Darniche	Alpine A110
1973	Jean-Luc Thérier	Alpine A110
1974	Jacques Henry	Alpine A110
1975	Jacques Henry	Alpine A110
1976	Bernard Darniche	Lancia Stratos
1977	Guy Fréquelin	Alpine A310
1978	Bernard Darniche	Lancia Stratos
1979	Bernard Béguin	Porsche 911 (SC)
1980	Jean Ragnotti	Renault 5 Alpine; Renault 5 Turbo
1981	Bruno Saby	Renault 5 Turbo
1982	Jean-Luc Thérier	Renault 5 Turbo
1983	Guy Fréquelin	Opel Ascona 400; Opel Manta 400
1984	Jean Ragnotti	Renault 5 Turbo
1985	Guy Fréquelin	Opel Manta 400
1986	Didier Auriol	MG Metro 6R4; Mercedes 190 2,3/16
1987	Didier Auriol	Ford Sierra RS Cosworth
1988	Didier Auriol	Ford Sierra RS Cosworth
1989	François Chatriot	BMW M3
1990	François Chatriot	BMW M3
1991	Bernard Béguin	Ford Sierra Cosworth 4x4
1992	Bernard Béguin	Ford Sierra Cosworth 4x4
1993	Bernard Béguin	Ford Escort RS Cosworth
1994	Patrick Bernardini	Ford Escort RS Cosworth
1995	Patrick Bernardini	Ford Escort RS Cosworth
1996	Gilles Panizzi	Peugeot 306 Maxi
1997	Gilles Panizzi	Peugeot 306 Maxi
1998	Philippe Bugalski	Citroën Xsara Kit-Car
1999	Philippe Bugalski	Citroën Xsara Kit-Car
2000	Philippe Bugalski	Citroën Xsara T4
2001	Sébastien Loeb	Citroën Xsara Kit-Car
2002	Benoît Rousselot	Subaru Impreza S7 WRC
2003	Alexandre Bengué	Peugeot 206 WRC
2004	Stéphane Sarrazin	Subaru Impreza S9 WRC
2005	Nicolas Bernardi	Peugeot 206 WRC
2006	Nicolas Vouilloz	Peugeot 307 WRC
2007	Patrick Henry	Peugeot 307 WRC
2008	Dany Snobeck	Peugeot 307 WRC
2009	Guillaume Canivenq	Peugeot 207 S2000
2010	Bryan Bouffier	Peugeot 207 S2000
2011	Gilles Nantet	Porsche 997 Cup
2012	Jean-Marie Cuoq	Ford Focus RS WRC
2013	Julien Maurin	Ford Fiesta RS WRC
2014	Julien Maurin	Ford Fiesta RS WRC
2015	Jean-Marie Cuoq	Citroën C4 WRC
2016	Sylvain Michel	Škoda Fabia R5
2017	Yoann Bonato	Citroën DS3 R5
2018	Yoann Bonato	Citroën C3 R5
2019	Yohan Rossel	Citroën C3 R5
2020	Yoann Bonato	Citroën C3 R5
2021	Yoann Bonato	Citroën C3 R5
2022	Quentin Giordano	Volkswagen Polo GTI R5
2023	Yoann Bonato	Citroën C3 Rally2
2024	Léo Rossel	Citroën C3 Rally2
