= Spanish Rally Championship =

- Country: Spain
- Inaugural season: 1956
- Folded: 2020
- Drivers: Varies from event to event
- Tyre suppliers: open
- Last Drivers' champion: (Spain) Pepe López (2020)
- Official website: rfeda.es

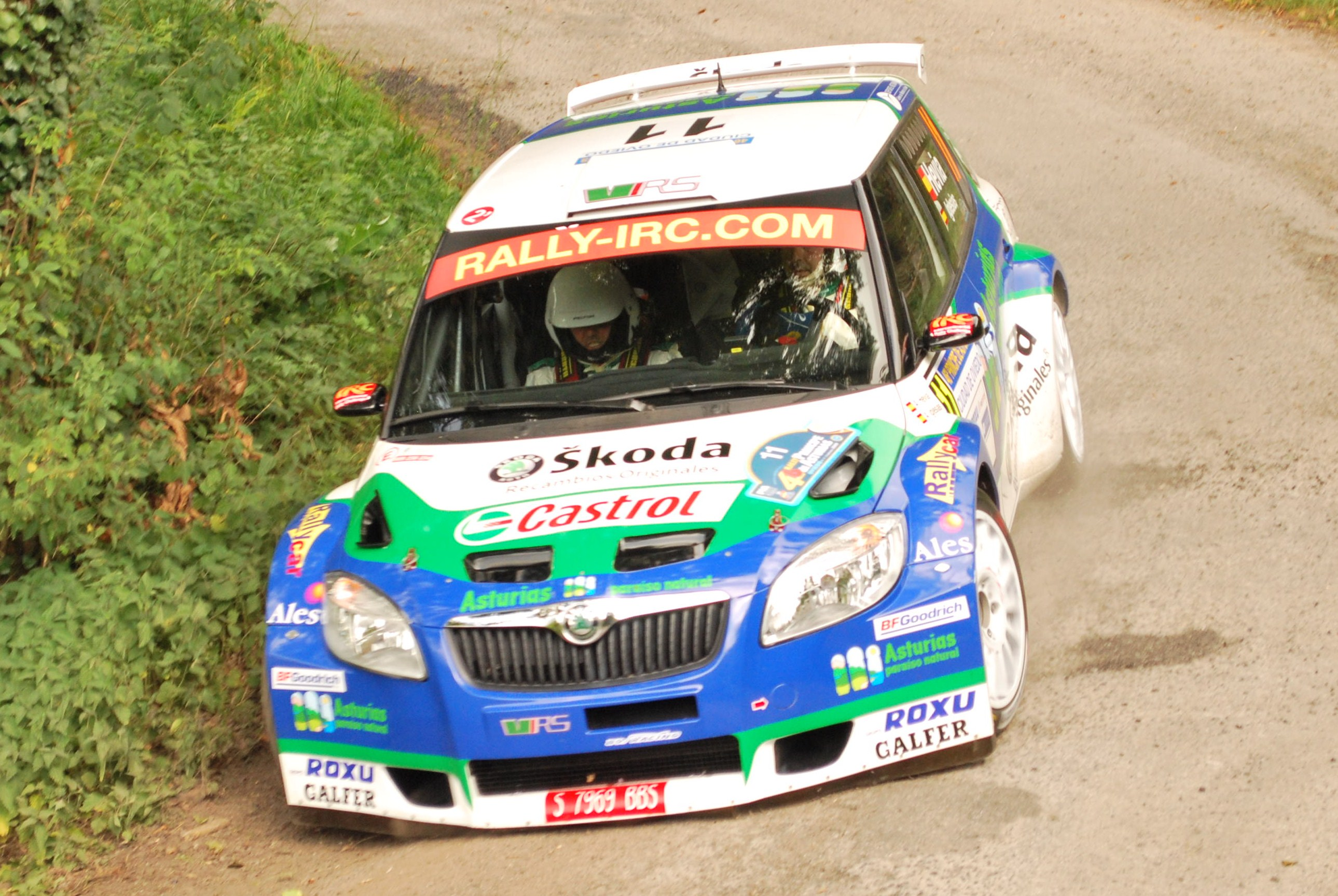
Alberto Hevia, the 2010 Spanish champion

The Campeonato de España de Rally (CERA) or Spanish Rally Championship was the most important rally championship in Spain. It was established in 1956. Starting from 2021, the Spanish Rally Championship, which was based entirely on asphalt events from 1993 season until 2020, was merged into the Súper Campeonato de España de Rally (S-CER), which also includes gravel events. Also the Campeonato de España de Rallyes de Tierra (CERT) is included starting from 2021 in this new Super Championship.

== Champions ==
Iván Ares driving a Porsche 997 GT3 at the 2012 Rally Rías Baixas

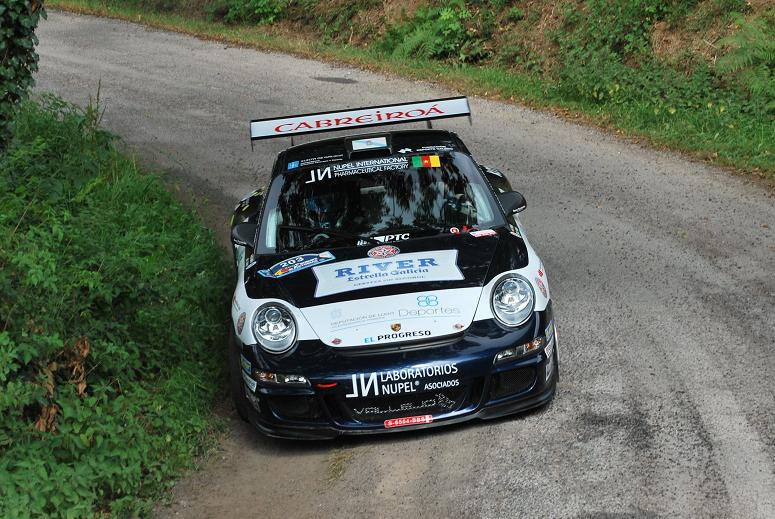
Sergio Vallejo at the 2009 Rally Príncipe de Asturias

Driver Championship

Season	Driver	Codriver	Car
1957	(Spain) Fernando Roqué	(Spain) Alfonso Marimón	Alfa Romeo Sprint Veloce
1958	(Spain) Jaime Milans del Bosch	(Spain) Antonio Forest	SEAT 1400 B
1959	(Spain) Luciano Eliakin	(Spain) «Pascal»	Saab 93
1960	(Spain) Víctor Sagi	(Spain) Antonio Agramunt	Porsche 356 1600 GT
1961	(Spain) Juan Fernández	(Spain) Ramón Grifoll	BMW 700 CS
1962	(Spain) Mariano Lorente	(Spain) Jesús Sáez	BMW 700 CS
1963	(Spain) Jaime Juncosa	(Spain) Jaime Juncosa Jr. Manuel Juncosa	SEAT 600 Abarth Fiat Abarth 850
1964	(Spain) Jaime Juncosa Jr.	(Spain)	Abarth 1000 TC
1965	(Spain) Jaime Juncosa Jr.	(Spain) Artemio Eche «Artemi»	
1966	(Spain) Juan Fernández	(Spain) Vidal-Ribas	Porsche 911
1967	(France) Bernard Tramont	(Spain) Ricardo Muñoz	Renault Alpine
1968	(France) Bernard Tramont	(Spain) Ricardo Muñoz	Renault Alpine
1969	(Spain) José María Palomo	(Spain) Jorge Adell	Porsche 911
1970	(Spain) Ruiz Giménez	(Spain) Rafael Castañeda	Porsche 911
1971	(Spain) Lucas Sainz	(Spain) Juan Carlos Oroño	Renault Alpine
1972	(Spain) Salvador Cañellas	(Spain) Daniel Ferrater	SEAT 124
1973	(Spain) Jorge Babler	(Spain) Ricardo Antonlín	SEAT 124
1974	(Spain) Antonio Zanini	(Spain) Víctor Sabater	SEAT 124 / 1800
1975	(Spain) Antonio Zanini	(Spain) Víctor Sabater	SEAT 124 / 1800
1976	(Spain) Antonio Zanini	(Spain) Víctor Sabater	SEAT 124 / 1800
1977	(Spain) Antonio Zanini	(Spain) Víctor Sabater	SEAT 124 / 1800
1978	(Spain) Antonio Zanini	(Spain) Víctor Sabater	SEAT 131 Abarth
1979	(Spain) Jorge de Bagration	(Spain) Ignacio Lewin	Lancia Stratos
1980	(Spain) Antonio Zanini	(Spain) Víctor Sabater	Porsche 911
1981	(Spain) Jorge de Bagration	(Spain) Ignacio Lewin	Lancia Stratos
1982	(Spain) Antonio Zanini	(Spain) Víctor sabater	Talbot Sunbeam Lotus
1983	(Spain) Genito Ortíz	(Spain) Ramón Mínguez / Susi Cabal	Renault 5 Turbo
1984	(Spain) Antonio Zanini	(Spain) Josep Autet	Ferrari 308 GTB
1985	(Spain) Salvador Servia	(Spain) Victor Sabater	Lancia Rally 037
1986	(Spain) Salvador Servia	(Spain) Victor Sabater	Lancia Rally 037
1987	(Spain) Carlos Sainz	(Spain) Antonio Boto	Ford Sierra Cosworth
1988	(Spain) Carlos Sainz	(Spain) Luis Moya	Ford Sierra Cosworth
1989	(Spain) Pep Basas	(Spain) Antonio Rodríguez	BMW M3
1990	(Spain) Jesús Puras	(Spain) José Arrarte	Lancia Delta Integrale
1991	(Spain) Jose María Ponce	(Spain) Juan Carlos Deniz	BMW M3
1992	(Spain) Jesús Puras	(Spain) José Arrarte	Lancia Delta Integrale
1993	(Spain) Mia Bardolet	(Spain) Joaquin Muntada	Opel Astra GSI
1994	(Spain) Oriol Gómez	(Spain) Marc Martí	Renault Clio 16V
1995	(Spain) Jesús Puras	(Spain) Alex Romaní	Citroën ZX 16V
1996	(Spain) Luis Climent	(Spain) Alex Romaní	Citroën ZX 16V
1997	(Spain) Jesús Puras	(Spain) Carlos del Barrio	Citroën ZX Kit Car
1998	(Spain) Jesús Puras	(Spain) Carlos del Barrio	Citroën ZX Kit Car
1999	(Spain) Jesús Puras	(Spain) Marc Martí	Citroën Xsara Kit Car
2000	(Spain) Jesús Puras	(Spain) Marc Martí	Citroën Xsara Kit Car
2001	(Spain) Luis Monzón	(Spain) José Deniz	Peugeot 206 WRC
2002	(Spain) Jesús Puras	(Spain) Carlos del Barrio	Citroën Xsara WRC
2003	(Spain) Miguel Ángel Fuster	(Spain) José Vicente Medina	Citroën Saxo S1600
2004	(Spain) Alberto Hevia	(Spain) Alberto Iglesias Pin	Renault Clio S1600
2005	(Spain) Dani Sordo	(Spain) Marc Martí	Citroën C2 S1600
2006	(Spain) Daniel Solà	(Spain) Xavier Amigo	Citroën C2 S1600
2007	(Spain) Miguel Ángel Fuster	(Spain) José Vicente Medina	Fiat Grande Punto S2000
2008	(Spain) Enrique García Ojeda	(Spain) Jordi Barrabés	Peugeot 207 S2000
2009	(Spain) Sergio Vallejo	(Spain) Diego Vallejo	Porsche 997 GT3
2010	(Spain) Alberto Hevia	(Spain) Alberto Iglesias Pin	Škoda Fabia S2000
2011	(Spain) Miguel Ángel Fuster	(Spain) Ignacio Aviñó	Porsche 911 GT3
2012	(Spain) Miguel Ángel Fuster	(Spain) Ignacio Aviñó	Porsche 997 GT3
2013	(Spain) Luis Monzón	(Spain) José Déniz	Mini Cooper WRC
2014	(Spain) Sergio Vallejo	(Spain) Diego Vallejo	Porsche 997 GT3 2010
2015	(Spain) Miguel Ángel Fuster	(Spain) Ignacio Aviñó	Porsche 911 GT3
2016	(Spain) Cristian García	(Spain) Rebeca Liso	Mitsubishi Lancer Evo X
2017	(Spain) Iván Ares	(Spain) Alberto Iglesias	Suzuki Swift R+ N5
2018	(Spain) Miguel Ángel Fuster	(Spain) Ignacio Aviñó	Hyundai i20 R5
2019	(Spain) Pepe López	(Spain) Borja Rozada	Citroën C3 R5
2020	(Spain) Pepe López	(Spain) Borja Rozada	Citroën C3 R5

== Spanish Rally Super Championship (S-CER) ==
The Spanish Rally Super Championship (S-CER) was founded in 2019.

== Super Champions ==
Season	Driver	Codriver	Car
2019	(Spain) Pepe López	(Spain) Borja Rozada	Citroën C3 R5
2020	(Spain) Pepe López	(Spain) Borja Rozada	Citroën C3 R5
2021	(Spain) José Antonio Suárez	(Spain) Alberto Iglesias	Škoda Fabia R5
2022	(Spain) Pepe López	(Spain) Borja Rozada	Hyundai i20 N Rally2
2023	(Spain) José Antonio Suárez	(Spain) Alberto Iglesias	Škoda Fabia RS Rally2
