= 1999 Tour de Corse =

Rally car racing event

1999 Tour de Corse 43rd Tour de Corse - Rallye de France
Round 6 of 14 in the 1999 World Rally Championship season
← Previous event	Next event →
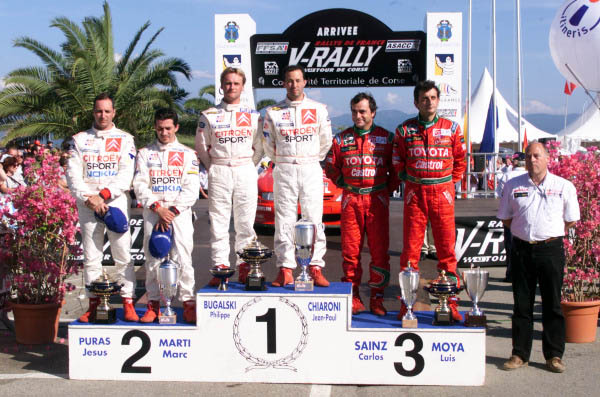
- Host country: France
- Rally base: Ajaccio
- Dates run: May 7, 1999 – May 9, 1999
- Stages: 16 (353.05 km; 219.38 miles)
- Stage surface: Tarmac
- Transport distance: 703.45 km (437.10 miles)
- Overall distance: 1,056.50 km (656.48 miles)

Statistics
- Crews registered: 138
- Crews: 138 at start, 85 at finish

Overall results
- Overall winner: (France) Philippe Bugalski (France) Automobiles Citroën; Citroën Xsara Kit Car; 3:44:35.7

The 1999 Tour de Corse (formally the 43rd Tour de Corse - Rallye de France) was a motor racing event for rally cars that was held over three days between 7 and 9 May 1999. It marked the 43rd running of the Tour de Corse, and was the sixth round of the 1999 World Rally Championship season. The 1999 event was based in the city of Ajaccio in France and was contested over sixteen special stages, covering a total competitive distance of 353.05km (319.38 miles).

Philippe Bugalski was the defending rally winner, stunning the world by beating the World Rally Championship drivers competing for manufacturers points. Tommi Makinen lead the championship with twenty six points; three more than closest rival Didier Auriol.

The event was won by Bugalski, bringing him into the top five of the World Rally Championship standings despite not being a manufacturer driver. This would foreshadow an overhaul of the regulations for next season to the detriment of the two-wheel drive kit cars. The rally also saw the introduction of the Peugeot 206 WRC, which would later win two world titles.

== Background ==
=== Entry list ===
The following crews were set to enter the rally. The event was open to crews competing in the World Rally Championship, as well as privateer entries that were not registered to score points in the manufacturer's championship. Twelve were entered under Group A regulations to compete in the World Rally Championship's Manufacturers' Championship.

Group A entries competing in the World Rally Championship
No.	Driver	Co-Driver	Entrant	Car	Tyre
1	(Finland) Tommi Makinen	(Finland) Risto Mannisenmaki	(Japan) Marlboro Mitsubishi Ralliart	Mitsubishi Lancer Evo VI	MI
2	(Belgium) Freddy Loix	(Belgium) Sven Smeets	(Japan) Marlboro Mitsubishi Ralliart	Mitsubishi Carisma GT Evo VI	MI
3	(Spain) Carlos Sainz	(Spain) Luis Moya	(Japan) Toyota Castrol Team	Toyota Corolla WRC	MI
4	(France) Didier Auriol	(France) Denis Giraudet	(Japan) Toyota Castrol Team	Toyota Corolla WRC	MI
5	(United Kingdom) Richard Burns	(United Kingdom) Robert Reid	(Japan) Subaru World Rally Team	Subaru Impreza S5 WRC 99	P
6	(Belgium) Bruno Thiry	(Belgium) Stephane Prevot	(Japan) Subaru World Rally Team	Subaru Impreza S5 WRC 99	P
7	(United Kingdom) Colin McRae	(United Kingdom) Nicky Grist	(United Kingdom) Ford Motor Co Ltd	Ford Focus WRC 99	MI
8	(France) Simon Jean-Joseph	(United Kingdom) Fred Gallagher	(United Kingdom) Ford Motor Co Ltd	Ford Focus WRC 99	MI
9	(Finland) Harri Rovanpera	(Finland) Risto Pietilainen	(Spain) SEAT Sport	SEAT Cordoba WRC	P
10	(Italy) Piero Liatti	(Italy) Carlo Cassina	(Spain) SEAT Sport	SEAT Cordoba WRC	P
14	(France) Francois Delecour	(France) Daniel Grataloup	(France) Peugeot Esso	Peugeot 206 WRC	MI
15	(France) Gilles Panizzi	(France) Jean-Paul Chiaroni	(France) Peugeot Esso	Peugeot 206 WRC	MI

=== Itinerary ===
All dates and times are CEST (UTC+2).

Date	No.	Time span	Stage name	Distance
7 May		8:15	Service A, Campo dell'Oro	—N/a
7 May	SS1	9:01	Verghia Pietra Rossa 1	26.55 km
7 May	SS2	9:42	Filitosa - Bicchisano 1	22.63 km
7 May		10:52	Service B, Propriano	—N/a
7 May	SS3	11:30	Portigliolo - Bocca Albitrina	16.54 km
7 May	SS4	12:04	Sartene - Carbini	27.21 km
7 May		13:44	Service C, Propriano	—N/a
7 May	~~SS5~~	~~14:25~~	~~Pont d'Acoravo - Zerubia 1~~	~~20.94 km~~
7 May	SS6	15:00	Aullene - Zicavo 1	25.48 km
7 May		16:40	Service D, Campo dell'Oro	—N/a
8 May		7:15	Service E, Campo dell'Oro	—N/a
8 May	SS7	7:52	Gare de Carbuccia - Gare Ucciani	11.11 km
8 May	SS8	8:50	Muracciole - Noceta	16.48 km
8 May		10:02	Service F, Corte Chabrieres	—N/a
8 May	SS9	11:15	Morosaglia - Campile	31.91 km
8 May	SS10	12:28	Taverna - Pont de Castirla	16.08 km
8 May		13:23	Service G, Corte Chabrieres	—N/a
8 May	SS11	14:21	Pont St. Laurent - Bustanico	33.12 km
8 May	SS12	15:14	Feo - Altiani	16.52 km
8 May		16:04	Service H, Corte Chabrieres	—N/a
9 May		7:00	Service I, Campo dell'Oro	—N/a
9 May	SS13	7:46	Verghia - Pietra Rossa 2	26.55 km
9 May	SS14	8:27	Filitosa - Bicchisano 2	22.63 km
9 May		9:37	Service J, Propriano	—N/a
9 May	SS15	10:18	Pont d'Acoravo - Zerubia 2	20.94 km
9 May	SS16	10:53	Allene - Zicavo 2	25.48 km
9 May		13:43	Service K, Campo dell'Oro	—N/a
9 May	SS17	14:50	Cannelle d'Orcino	13.82 km
9 May		15:42	Service L, Campo dell'Oro	—N/a

== Report ==
=== Overall ===
==== Summary ====
Following Rally Catalunya, it was no surprise that the Citroën Xsara Kit Cars of Philippe Bugalski and Jesús Puras once again gave the World Rally Car teams a hard time. In a way, this performance proved to be even more dominant than the previous round on the Spanish tarmac, indirectly resulting in an overhaul of the regulations for next season to the detriment of FIA F2 cars. Bugalski took the lead on opening day and did not lose his grip on the lead for the remainder of the rally, winning 9 special stages in the process. Bugalski sprayed the winner's champagne for the second consecutive rally. Puras kept up with his teammate during rally, but only won 4 special stages resulting in a creditable second place, and a 1-2 result for the Citroën team. Carlos Sainz stayed closest to the Citroëns and completed the podium in third place. The rally also saw the debut of the Peugeot 206 WRC in the hands of François Delecour and Gilles Panizzi, where good times on special stages for both drivers (and a stage win for Delecour) preceded an early retirement.

This version of the Tour de Corse tested the format of the TV stage, where the final special stage of the rally was shown live on television, giving the first three crews extra points for the drivers and manufacturers championship. With the fastest crew receiving three points the second-fastest receiving two points, and the third-fastest receiving one point. Those who had retired in previous special stages could also take part in the TV stage.

==== Classification ====
Position	No.	Driver	Co-driver	Entrant	Car	Time	Difference	Points
1	16	(France) Philippe Bugalski	(France) Jean-Paul Chiaroni	(France) Automobiles Citroen	Citroen Xsara	3:44:35.7	0.0	10
2	17	(Spain) Jesus Puras	(Spain) Marc Marti	(France) Automobiles Citroen	Citroen Xsara	3:45:10.4	+34.7	6
3	3	(Spain) Carlos Sainz	(Spain) Luis Moya	(Japan) Toyota Castrol Team	Toyota Corolla WRC	3:45:45.0	+1:09.3	4+1
4	7	(United Kingdom) Colin McRae	(United Kingdom) Nicky Grist	(United Kingdom) Ford Motor Co Ltd	Ford Focus WRC 99	3:45:53.8	+1:18.1	3
5	4	(France) Didier Auriol	(France) Denis Giraudet	(Japan) Toyota Castrol Team	Toyota Corolla WRC	3:46:08.3	+1:32.6	2+3
6	1	(Finland) Tommi Makinen	(Finland) Risto Mannisenmaki	(Japan) Marlboro Mitsubishi Ralliart	Mitsubishi Lancer Evo VI	3:47:26.1	+2:50.4	1+2
7	5	(United Kingdom) Richard Burns	(United Kingdom) Robert Reid	(Japan) Subaru World Rally Team	Subaru Impreza S5 WRC 99	3:47:42.6	+3:06.9	0
8	2	(Belgium) Freddy Loix	(Belgium) Sven Smeets	(Japan) Marlboro Mitsubishi Ralliart	Mitsubishi Carisma GT Evo VI	3:50:27.4	+5:51.7	0
9	10	(Italy) Piero Liatti	(Italy) Carlo Cassina	(Spain) SEAT Sport	SEAT Cordoba WRC	3:51:41.6	+7:05.9	0
10	23	(Finland) Tapio Laukkanen	(Finland) Kaj Lindstrom	(France) Renault Elf Dealer Rallying	Renault Megane Maxi	3:54:32.8	+9:57.1	0
11	20	(Denmark) Henrik Lundgaard	(Denmark) Freddy Pedersen	(Denmark) Henrik Lundgaard	Toyota Corolla WRC	3:54:44.0	+10:08.3	0
12	18	(Spain) Luis Climent Asensio	(Spain) Alex Romani	(Spain) Valencia Terra y Mar	Subaru Impreza S5 WRC 98	3:55:27.7	+10:52.0	0
13	9	(Finland) Harri Rovanpera	(Finland) Risto Pietilainen	(Spain) SEAT Sport	SEAT Cordoba WRC	3:56:19.5	+11:43.8	0
14	31	(France) Benoit Rousselot	(France) Jack Boyere	(France) Benoit Rousselot	Renault Megane Maxi	3:56:31.9	+11:56.2	0
15	35	(France) Jean-Claude Torre	(France) Patrick de la Foata	(France) Jean-Claude Torre	Subaru Impreza 555	3:59:45.2	+15:09.5	0
16	22	(Japan) Toshihiro Arai	(United Kingdom) Roger Freeman	(Japan) Subaru Allstars Endless Sport	Subaru Impreza S5 WRC 98	3:59:56.8	+15:21.1	0
17	34	(France) Francis Mariani	(France) Bruno Brissart	(France) Francis Mariani	Subaru Impreza 555	4:00:35.3	+15:59.6	0
18	37	(Italy) Giovanni Manfrinato	(Italy) Claudio Condotta	(Italy) Giovanni Mandrinato	Ford Escort WRC	4:01:04.7	+16:29.0	0
19	49	(France) Sébastien Loeb	(Monaco) Daniel Elena	Equipe de France FFSA	Citroen Saxo	4:04:37.9	+20:02.2	0
20	26	(Uruguay) Gustavo Trelles	(Argentina) Martin Christie	(Italy) Ralliart Italia	Mitsubishi Lancer Evo VI	4:04:52.2	+20:16.5	0
21	27	(Austria) Manfred Stohl	(Austria) Peter Muller	(Austria) Manfred Stohl	Mitsubishi Lancer Evo V	4:05:29.4	+20:53.7	0
22	29	(Oman) Hamed Al-Wahaibi	(New Zealand) Tony Sircombe	Team Mitsubishi Oman	Mitsubishi Lancer Evo V	4:06:01.9	+21:26.2	0
23	21	(Germany) Isolde Holderied	(France) Catherine Fracois	(Germany) Toyota Castrol Deutschland	Toyota Corolla WRC	4:06:10.5	+21:34.8	0
24	39	(France) Jean-Marie Santoni	(France) Jean-Marc Casamatta	(France) Jean-Marie Santoni	Mitsubishi Carisma GT Evo VI	4:08:44.5	+24:08.8	0
25	60	(France) Olivier Payet	(France) Valerie Payet	(France) Olivier Payet	Peugeot 306 Maxi	4:12:58.3	+28:22.6	0
26	40	(Uruguay) Gabriel Mendez	(Uruguay) Daniel Muzio	(Uruguay) Gabriel Mendez	Mitsubishi Lancer Evo V	4:15:04.5	+30:28.8	0
27	30	(Austria) Kris Rosenberger	(Sweden) Per Carlsson	(New Zealand) Reece Jones Rallysport	Mitsubishi Lancer Evo IV	4:15:14.4	+30:38.7	0
28	41	(France) Francois Faggianelli	(France) Jean-Dominique Mattei	(France) Francois Faggianelli	Mitsubishi Carisma GT Evo VI	4:15:38.2	+31:02.5	0
29	111	(France) Cedric Robert	(France) Lionel Currat	(France) Cedric Robert	Peugeot 306 S16	4:16:36.9	+32:01.2	0
30	88	(France) Jean-Baptiste Serpaggi	(France) Jacques-Julien Ranucci	(France) Jean-Baptiste Serpaggi	Peugeot 106 S16	4:17:24.7	+32:49.0	0
31	76	(France) Nicolas Bernardi	(France) Rose-Marie Lenormand-Bassiere	(France) Nicolas Bernardi	Peugeot 106 S16	4:17:48.6	+33:12.9	0
32	75	(France) Fabrice Morel	(France) Jose Boyer	(Spain) RACC Motorsport	Peugeot 106 S16	4:18:18.0	+33:42.3	0
33	46	(France) Jose Micheli	(France) Sabrina De Castelli	(France) Jose Micheli	Ford Escort RS Cosworth	4:19:43.6	+35:07.9	0
34	78	(France) Olivier Marty	(France) Aline Berenguer-Mares	(France) Olivier Marty	Peugeot 106 S16	4:20:11.6	+35:35.9	0
35	56	(France) Paul-Andre Mariani	(France) Louis Mariani	(France) Paul-Andre Mariani	Mitsubishi Lancer Evo V	4:20:14.3	+35:38.6	0
36	47	(France) Lucien Agostini	(France) Louis Zannettini	(France) Lucien Agostini	Subaru Impreza 555	4:20:15.6	+35:39.9	0
37	59	(France) Jean-Paul Ayme	(France) Brigitte Ayme	(France) Jean-Paul Ayme	Mitsubishi Carisma GT Evo IV	4:21:12.2	+36:36.5	0
38	80	(France) Jean-Marc Manzagol	(France) Julien Anziani	(France) Jean-Marc Manzagol	Peugeot 106 S16	4:21:47.1	+37:11.4	0
39	84	(France) Guyhlem Dussaucy	(France) Olivier Belot	(France) Guyhlem Dussaucy	Peugeot 106 S16	4:22:04.8	+37:29.1	0
40	81	(France) Franck Amaudru	(France) Sophie Argeles	(France) Franck Amaudru	Peugeot 106 S16	4:23:00.3	+38:24.6	0
41	94	(France) Emmanuel Guigou	(France) Patrice Pochon	(France) Emmanuel Guigou	Peugeot 106 Rallye	4:26:51.0	+42:15.3	0
42	101	(France) Cedric Petiet	(France) Carine Corcella	(France) Cedric Petiet	Peugeot 106 Rallye	4:28:30.6	+43:54.9	0
43	74	(France) Thierry Dard	(France) Stephane Damerval	(France) Thierry Dard	Honda Civic VTi	4:29:39.9	+45:04.2	0
44	116	(France) Serge Silvani	(France) Philippe Martini	(France) Serge Silvani	Renault Clio Williams	4:30:54.5	+46:18.8	0
45	114	(France) Laurent Guerrini	(France) Jean-Marc Tramoni	(France) Laurent Guerrini	Peugeot 306 S16	4:31:53.1	+47:17.4	0
46	87	(Switzerland) Rolli Rolandini	(Finland) Marjo Gotte	(Switzerland) Rolli Rolandini	Peugeot 106 S16	4:31:53.7	+47:18.0	0
47	70	(France) Francois Couchet	(France) Nicolas Berthoud	(France) Francois Couchet	BMW 325i E36	4:31:54.0	+47:18.3	0
48	65	(Italy) Marta Candian	(Italy) Mara Biotti	(Italy) Marta Candian	Renault Clio Williams	4:32:19.2	+47:43.5	0
49	58	(France) Michel Bourgeois	(France) Joel Mangeant	(France) Michel Bourgeois	Mitsubishi Lancer Evo III	4:32:45.9	+48:10.2	0
50	105	(France) Patrick Pugliese	(France) Franck Giambi	(France) Patrick Pugliese	Peugeot 205 Rallye	4:32:47.6	+48:11.9	0
51	123	(France) Regis Triboulet	(France) James Boisset	(France) Regis Triboulet	Peugeot 306 S16	4:33:51.2	+49:15.5	0
52	93	(France) Christophe Gely	(France) Jean Vincensini	(France) Christophe Gely	Peugeot 106 Rallye	4:34:12.4	+49:36.7	0
53	113	(France) Claude Cesari	(France) Felix Mariani	(France) Claude Cesari	Renault Clio 16S	4:34:13.6	+49:37.9	0
54	83	(France) Charles Clot	(France) Anthony Bosio	(France) Charles Clot	Peugeot 106 S16	4:34:27.8	+49:52.1	0
55	92	(France) Gilles Montigaud	(France) Hubert Brun	(France) Gilles Montigaud	Peugeot 106 Rallye	4:34:54.3	+50:18.6	0
56	120	(France) Jean-Paul Lange	(France) Sebastien Simon	(France) Jean-Paul Lange	Renault Clio Williams	4:36:21.2	+51:45.5	0
57	130	(Andorra) Ferran Font	(Spain) Joan Sureda	(Andorra) Ferran Font	Peugeot 106 Rallye	4:37:31.4	+52:55.7	0
58	69	(France) Pierrick Carsillo	(France) Vanina Grimaldi	(France) Pierrick Carsillo	Ford Escort RS Cosworth	4:40:15.7	+55:40.0	0
59	108	(Germany) Niklas Birr	(Germany) Timo Gottschalk	(Germany) Niklas Birr	SEAT Ibiza Cupra Mk2	4:41:18.9	+56:43.2	0
60	96	(France) Stephane Vrinat	(France) Sylvain Mahier	(France) Stephane Vrinat	Peugeot 106 Rallye	4:41:28.3	+56:52.6	0
61	102	(France) Christian Ajoux	(France) Arnaud Gheysens	(France) Christian Ajoux	Peugeot 106 Rallye	4:41:37.8	+57:02.1	0
62	131	(France) Vaness	(France) Laurent Fourcade	(France) Vaness	Peugeot 106 Rallye	4:43:18.4	+58:42.7	0
63	104	(France) Francois Satti	(France) Christian Delclaud	(France) Francois Satti	Peugeot 106 Rallye	4:43:39.6	+59:03.9	0
64	142	(France) Olivier Daunas	(France) Valerie Jean	(France) Olivier Daunas	Peugeot 106 Rallye	4:44:27.5	+59:51.8	0
65	125	(France) Patrick Blanchard	(France) Martine Metairie	(France) Patrick Blanchard	Honda Integra Type-R	4:46:45.0	+1:02:09.3	0
66	95	(France) Patrice Riviere	(France) Harold Lemoine	(France) Patrice Riviere	Peugeot 106 Rallye	4:46:58.9	+1:02:23.2	0
67	129	(France) Jean-Marc Poisson	(France) Olivier Lesigne	(France) Jean-Marc Poisson	Honda Civic VTi (EG6)	4:47:33.3	+1:02:57.6	0
68	121	(France) Bertrand Fassio	(France) Patrick Perrot	(France) Bertrand Fassio	Peugeot 306 S16	4:47:46.0	+1:03:10.3	0
69	97	(France) Guillaume Cordier	(France) Eric Nicoulaud	(France) Bertrand Fassio	Peugeot 106 Rallye	4:48:19.5	+1:03:43.8	0
70	127	(France) Noel Molluso	(France) David Molluso	(France) Noel Molluso	Peugeot 205 GTI 1.9	4:48:39.8	+1:04:04.1	0
71	66	(France) Paul Cervetti	(France) Rita-Maryvonne Megard	(France) Paul Cervetti	Renault Clio Williams	4:48:48.6	+1:04:12.9	0
72	71	(France) Carli Nardi	(France) Laurent Massiani	(France) Carli Nardi	Citroen ZX Turbo Diesel	4:50:31.0	+1:05:55.3	0
73	137	(France) Ange-Marie Ottavy	(France) Thierry-Guy Maillot	(France) Ange-Marie Ottavy	Peugeot 106 Rallye	4:57:08.7	+1:12:33.0	0
74	140	(France) Gilles Caridroit	(France) Severine Vernier	(France) Gilles Caridroit	Peugeot 106 Rallye	5:00:54.7	+1:16:19.0	0
75	135	(France) Jacques Boudinet	(France) Pascale Hubert	(France) Jacques Boudinet	Peugeot 106 Rallye	5:01:22.0	+1:16:46.3	0
76	91	(France) Patrick Cormenier	(France) Thierry Bodit	(France) Patrick Cormenier	Peugeot 106 Rallye	5:02:19.8	+1:17:44.1	0
77	133	(France) Eric Cascio	(France) Jany Vinay	(France) Eric Cascio	Peugeot 106 Rallye	5:02:40.0	+1:18:04.3	0
78	82	(France) Karine Puech	(France) Laurence Malvault	(France) Karine Puech	Peugeot 106 S16	5:03:15.7	+1:18:40.0	0
79	54	(France) Guy Pujol	(France) Michele Scheffer	(France) Guy Pujol	Ford Escort RS Cosworth	5:03:55.0	+1:19:19.3	0
80	128	(France) Pascal Petretti	(France) Julia Sarocchi	(France) Pascal Petretti	Peugeot 205 GTI 1.9	5:04:53.3	+1:20:17.6	0
81	134	(France) Favid Fuoco	(France) Franck Vallette	(France) Favid Fuoco	Peugeot 106 Rallye	5:07:38.4	+1:23:02.7	0
82	141	(France) Michel Le Bolloch	(France) Alain Ricard	(France) Michel Le Bolloch	Peugeot 106 Rallye	5:10:40.9	+1:26:05.2	0
83	138	(France) Gavin Deliperi	(France) Patrick Mias	(France) Gavin Deliperi	Peugeot 205 Rallye	5:23:26.2	+1:38:50.5	0
84	68	(France) Alain Malegarie	(France) Catherine Malegarie	(France) Alain Malegarie	Peugeot 306 S16	5:29:52.4	+1:45:16.7	0
85	132	(Portugal) Antonio Pinto dos Santos	(Portugal) Nuno Rodrigues da Silva	(Portugal) Antonio Pinto dos Santos	Renault 4 GTL	5:57:08.0	+2:12:32.3	0
Retired SS17	6	(Belgium) Bruno Thiry	(Belgium) Stephane Prevot	(Japan) Subaru World Rally Team	Subaru Impreza S5 WRC 99	Accident		0
Retired SS17	14	(France) Francois Delecour	(France) Daniel Grataloup	(France) Peugeot Esso	Peugeot 206 WRC	Electrical		0
Retired SS17	38	(France) Jean-Pierre Manzagol	(France) Xavier Pierlovisi	(France) Jean-Pierre Manzagol	Peugeot 306 Maxi	Electrical		0
Retired SS17	57	(France) Sebastien Chipponi	(France) Gilbert Dini	(France) Sebastien Chipponi	Mitsubishi Carisma GT Evo V	Retired		0
Retired SS17	106	(France) Jacky Cesbron	(France) Paul Giraud	(France) Jacky Cesbron	Peugeot 106 Kid	Retired		0
Retired SS16	24	(United Kingdom) Martin Rowe	(United Kingdom) Derek Ringer	(France) Renault Elf Dealer Rallying	Renault Megane Maxi	Transmission		0
Retired SS16	43	(Hungary) Krisztian Hideg	(Hungary) Peter Tajnafoi	(Hungary) Krisztian Hideg	Subaru Impreza WRX STi	Retired		0
Retired SS16	44	(Belgium) Bob Colsoul	(Belgium) Tom Colsoul	(Belgium) Bob Colsoul	Mitsubishi Lancer Evo V	Retired		0
Retired SS16	64	(France) Julien Barbolosi	(France) Pierre Poli	(France) Julien Barbolosi	Peugeot 306 Maxi	Retired		0
Retired SS15	100	(France) Mathieu Biasion	(France) Mickael Coudert	(France) Mathieu Biasion	Peugeot 106 Rallye	Accident		0
Retired SS13	28	(Finland) Jouko Puhakka	(Finland) Jakke Honkanen	(Japan) Tyre Research Institute R.T.	Mitsubishi Lancer Evo V	Accident		0
Retired SS13	33	(France) Philippe Rognoni	(France) Etienne Patrone	(France) Philippe Rognoni	Mitsubishi Carisma GT Evo VI	Accident		0
Retired SS13	51	(Italy) Gianluigi Galli	(Italy) Guido D'Amore	(Italy) Gianluigi Galli	Mitsubishi Carisma GT Evo VI	Retired		0
Retired SS13	86	(France) Eric Codaccioni	(France) Didier Zepu	(France) Eric Codaccioni	Peugeot 106 S16	Mechanical		0
Retired SS13	99	(France) Nicolas Gardere	(France) Edouard Momplot	(France) Nicolas Gardere	Peugeot 106 Rallye	Retired		0
Retired SS12	15	(France) Gilles Panizzi	(France) Jean-Paul Chiaroni	(France) Peugeot Esso	Peugeot 206 WRC	Mechanical		0
Retired SS11	52	(Italy) Corrado Fontana	(Italy) Daniele Pelliccioni	(Italy) Corrado Fontana	Mitsubishi Lancer Evo V	Retired		0
Retired SS11	76	(France) Paul Tomasini	(France) Nathalie Daures	(France) Paul Tomasini	Nissan Sunny GTI-R	Retired		0
Retired SS11	110	(Germany) Axel Richter	(Germany) Peggy Porrmann	(Germany) Axel Richter	SEAT Ibiza Cupra Mk2	Retired		0
Retired SS10	85	(France) Pascal Enjorlas	(France) Bruno Nas De Tourris	(France) Pascal Enjorlas	Peugeot 106 S16	Retired		0
Retired SS9	45	(Germany) Janina Depping	(Germany) Susanna Kramer	(Germany) Janina Depping	Ford Escort RS Cosworth	Retired		0
Retired SS9	98	(France) Laurent Derasse	(France) Christophe Derasse	(France) Laurent Derasse	Peugeot 106 Rallye	Retired		0
Retired SS9	115	(France) Claude Bensimon	(France) Emmanuel Bracconi	(France) Claude Bensimon	Renault Clio Williams	Retired		0
Retired SS9	117	(France) Philippe Fons	(France) Jean-Louis Giudicelli	(France) Philippe Fons	Renault Clio Williams	Retired		0
Retired SS9	118	(France) Jean-Michel Pietri	(France) Jean-Charles Mondoloni	(France) Jean-Michel Pietri	Renault Clio Williams	Fuel Pump		0
Retired SS9	136	(France) Ange-Marie Chiappe	(France) Sandrine Geairain	(France) Ange-Marie Chiappe	Peugeot 205 Rallye	Retired		0
Retired SS8	25	(Italy) Andrea Maselli	(Italy) Nicola Arena	(Italy) Andrea Maselli	Renault Clio Maxi	Engine		0
Retired SS8	42	(New Zealand) Reece Jones	(New Zealand) Leo Bult	(New Zealand) Reece Jones	Mitsubishi Lancer Evo V	Retired		0
Retired SS8	77	(France) Brice Tirabassi	(France) Delphine Bernardi	(France) Brice Tirabassi	Peugeot 106 S16	Retired		0
Retired SS7	32	(France) Fabien Vericel	(France) Vincent Ducher	Equipe de France FFSA	Citroen Saxo Kit Car	Gearbox		0
Retired SS7	53	(France) Franck Metiffiot	(France) Christian Caffardo	(France) Franck Metiffiot	Subaru Impreza GT Turbo	Retired		0
Retired SS7	90	(France) Marc Amourette	(France) Stephane Pozzo di Borgo	(France) Marc Amourette	Peugeot 106 S16	Retired		0
Retired SS7	124	(France) Frederic Adani	(France) Christophe Adani	(France) Frederic Adani	Renault Clio 16S	Retired		0
Retired SS7	126	(France) Didier Vellutini	(France) Paul Biggi	(France) Didier Vellutini	Renault Clio 16S	Retired		0
Retired SS6	62	(France) Jacques Richaud	(France) Nicole Poulet	(France) Jacques Richaud	Peugeot 306 Maxi	Retired		0
Retired SS6	67	(France) Thierry Chkondali	(France) Patrice Gehin	(France) Thierry Chkondali	Renault Megane Coupe 16v	Retired		0
Retired SS6	72	(Italy) Flavio Savoldelli	(Italy) Ebron Genuessi	(Italy) Flavio Savoldelli	Opel Corsa GSi	Retired		0
Retired SS6	122	(France) Jean-Michel Bourgeois	(France) Olivier Pieri	(France) Jean-Michel Bourgeois	Peugeot 306 S16	Retired		0
Retired SS4	109	(France) Franck Lions	(France) Benjamin Veillas	(France) Franck Lions	Renault Clio Williams	Retired		0
Retired SS3	19	(Saudi Arabia) Abdullah Bakhashab	(United Kingdom) Michael Park	Toyota Team Saudi Arabia	Toyota Corolla WRC	Accident		0
Retired SS3	48	(France) Henri Panunzi	(France) Patrick Struffi	(France) Henri Panunzi	Ford Escort RS Cosworth	Retired		0
Retired SS3	112	(France) Jacques Casabianca	(France) Laurent Vitali	(France) Jacques Casabianca	Renault Clio Williams	Retired		0
Retired SS3	119	(France) Paul Saly	(France) Stephane Louis	(France) Paul Saly	Renault Clio Williams	Retired		0
Retired SS2	55	(France) Jean-Daniel Tomasi	(France) Serge Garo	(France) Jean-Daniel Tomasi	Ford Escort RS Cosworth	Retired		0
Retired SS2	139	(France) Paul-Louis Ristori	(France) Lucie Paoli	(France) Paul-Louis Ristori	Peugeot 106 Rallye	Retired		0
Retired SS1	8	(France) Simon Jean-Joseph	(United Kingdom) Fred Gallagher	(United Kingdom) Ford Motor Co Ltd	Ford Focus WRC 99	Electrical		0
Retired SS1	50	(Italy) Apy	(Italy) Piero Alfano	(Italy) Apy	Mitsubishi Lancer Evo V	Retired		0
Retired SS1	61	(France) Jean-Luc Mondoloni	(France) Antoine Albertini	(France) Jean-Luc Mondoloni	Peugeot 309 GTI	Retired		0
Retired SS1	73	(France) Stephane Rovina	(France) Ludovic Malatesta	(France) Stephane Rovina	Citroen Saxo VTS	Retired		0
Retired SS1	79	(France) Alexandre Bengue	(France) Jean-Claude Grau	(France) Alexandre Bengue	Peugeot 106 S16	Accident		0
Retired SS1	89	(France) Pierre Quilici	(France) Thierry Gorguilo	(France) Pierre Quilici	Peugeot 106 S16	Retired		0
Retired SS1	103	(France) Henri Bellotti	(France) Eric Gorguilo	(France) Henri Bellotti	Peugeot 106 Rallye	Retired		0
Retired SS1	107	(France) Gilles Chevalier	(France) Rene Belleville	(France) Gilles Chevalier	Peugeot 106 Rallye	Retired		0

==== Special Stages ====
All dates and times are EAT (UTC+3).

Day	Stage	Time	Name	Length (km)	Winner	Time	Rally leader
1 7 May	SS1	9:01	Verghia - Pietra Rossa 1	26.55	(United Kingdom) Colin McRae	16:53.6	(United Kingdom) Colin McRae
1 7 May	SS2	9:42	Filitosa - Bicchisano 1	22.63	(France) Philippe Bugalski	14:21.0	(France) Francois Delecour
1 7 May	SS3	11:30	Portigliolo - Bocca Albitrina	16.54	(France) Philippe Bugalski	9:46.0	(France) Philippe Bugalski
1 7 May	SS4	12:04	Sartene - Carbini	27.21	(France) Philippe Bugalski	16:27.8	(France) Philippe Bugalski
1 7 May	SS5	14:25	Pont d'Acoravo - Zerubia 1	20.94	Cancelled		(France) Philippe Bugalski
1 7 May	SS6	15:00	Aullene - Zicavo 1	25.48	(Spain) Jesus Puras	16:05.3	(France) Philippe Bugalski
2 8 May	SS7	7:52	Gare de Carbuccia - Gare Ucciani	11.11	(France) Francois Delecour	7:44.0	(France) Philippe Bugalski
2 8 May	SS8	8:50	Muracciole - Noceta	16.48	(France) Philippe Bugalski	10:01.2	(France) Philippe Bugalski
2 8 May	SS9	11:15	Morosaglia - Campile	31.91	(Spain) Jesus Puras	20:04.3	(France) Philippe Bugalski
2 8 May	SS10	12:28	Taverna - Pont de Castirla	16.08	(France) Philippe Bugalski	9:30.1	(France) Philippe Bugalski
2 8 May	SS11	14:21	Pont St. Laurent - Bustanico	33.12	(France) Philippe Bugalski	22:20.8	(France) Philippe Bugalski
2 8 May	SS12	15:14	Feo - Altiani	316.52	(Spain) Jesus Puras	11:13.9	(France) Philippe Bugalski
3 9 Apr	SS13	7:46	Verghia - Pietra Rossa 2	26.55	(France) Philippe Bugalski	16:35.9	(France) Philippe Bugalski
3 9 Apr	SS14	8:27	Filitosa - Bicchisano 2	22.63	(Spain) Jesus Puras	14:06.2	(France) Philippe Bugalski
3 9 Apr	SS15	10:18	Pont d'Acoravo - Zerubia 2	20.94	(France) Philippe Bugalski	12:29.8	(France) Philippe Bugalski
3 9 Apr	SS16	10:53	Allene - Zicavo 2	25.48	(France) Philippe Bugalski	16:01.4	(France) Philippe Bugalski
3 9 Apr	SS17	14:50	Canelle d'Orcino - La Liscia	25.48	(France) Didier Auriol	10:02.6	(France) Philippe Bugalski

==== Championship Standings ====
Pos.	Drivers' Championship			Manufacturers' Championship		
Pos.	Move	Driver	Points	Move	Manufacturer	Points
1		(Finland) Tommi Makinen	29		(Japan) Toyota Castrol Team	61
2		(France) Didier Auriol	28		(Japan) Marlboro Mitsubishi Ralliart	38
3		(United Kingdom) Colin McRae	23		(United Kingdom) Ford Motor Co Ltd	34
4		(Spain) Carlos Sainz	21		(Japan) Subaru World Rally Team	20
5		(France) Philippe Bugalski	20		(Spain) SEAT Sport	8
