= 1999 Rally Catalunya =

Rallying motorsport event

1999 Rally Catalunya 35th Rallye Catalunya - Costa Brava
Round 5 of 14 in the 1999 World Rally Championship season
| ← Previous event | Next event → |
- Host country: Spain
- Rally base: Lloret de Mar
- Dates run: April 19, 1999 – April 21, 1999
- Stages: 19 (396.01 km; 246.07 miles)
- Stage surface: Tarmac
- Transport distance: 1,317.30 km (818.53 miles)
- Overall distance: 1,697.65 km (1,054.87 miles)

Statistics
- Crews registered: 109
- Crews: 109 at start, 57 at finish

Overall results
- Overall winner: (France) Philippe Bugalski (France) Automobiles Citroën; Citroën Xsara Kit Car; 4:13:45.6

The 1999 Rally Catalunya (formally the 35th Rallye Catalunya - Costa Brava) was a motor racing event for rally cars that was held over three days between 19 and 21 April 1999. It marked the 35th running of the Rally Catalunya, and was the fifth round of the 1999 World Rally Championship season. The 1999 event was based in the town of Lloret de Mar in Spain and was contested over nineteen special stages, covering a total competitive distance of 396.01 km (246.07 miles).

Colin McRae was the defending rally winner, as was Ford Motor Co Ltd, having won the previous two rallies. Tommi Makinen lead the championship with twenty three points; three more than McRae.

The event was won by Philippe Bugalski, driving a Citroën Xsara Kit Car that was not entered for the full World Championship. This would foreshadow an overhaul of the regulations for next season to the detriment of the two-wheel drive kit cars.

== Background ==
=== Entry list ===
The following crews were set to enter the rally. The event was open to crews competing in the World Rally Championship, as well as privateer entries that were not registered to score points in the manufacturer's championship. Twelve were entered under Group A regulations to compete in the World Rally Championship's Manufacturers' Championship.

Group A entries competing in the World Rally Championship
| No. | Driver | Co-Driver | Entrant | Car | Tyre |
|---|---|---|---|---|---|
| 1 | (Finland) Tommi Makinen | (Finland) Risto Mannisenmaki | (Japan) Marlboro Mitsubishi Ralliart | Mitsubishi Lancer Evo VI | M |
| 2 | (Belgium) Freddy Loix | (Belgium) Sven Smeets | (Japan) Marlboro Mitsubishi Ralliart | Mitsubishi Carisma GT Evo VI | M |
| 3 | (Spain) Carlos Sainz | (Spain) Luis Moya | (Japan) Toyota Castrol Team | Toyota Corolla WRC | M |
| 4 | (France) Didier Auriol | (France) Denis Giraudet | (Japan) Toyota Castrol Team | Toyota Corolla WRC | M |
| 5 | (United Kingdom) Richard Burns | (United Kingdom) Robert Reid | (Japan) Subaru World Rally Team | Subaru Impreza S5 WRC 99 | P |
| 6 | (Belgium) Bruno Thiry | (Belgium) Stephane Prevot | (Japan) Subaru World Rally Team | Subaru Impreza S5 WRC 99 | P |
| 7 | (United Kingdom) Colin McRae | (United Kingdom) Nicky Grist | (United Kingdom) Ford Motor Co Ltd | Ford Focus WRC 99 | M |
| 8 | (France) Simon Jean-Joseph | (United Kingdom) Fred Gallagher | (United Kingdom) Ford Motor Co Ltd | Ford Focus WRC 99 | M |
| 9 | (Finland) Harri Rovanpera | (Finland) Risto Pietilainen | (Spain) SEAT Sport | SEAT Cordoba WRC | P |
| 10 | (Italy) Piero Liatti | (Italy) Carlo Cassina | (Spain) SEAT Sport | SEAT Cordoba WRC | P |
| 11 | (Germany) Armin Schwarz | (Germany) Manfred Hiemer | (Czech Republic) Skoda Motorsport | Skoda Octavia WRC | P |
| 12 | (Czech Republic) Pavel Sibera | (Czech Republic) Petr Gross | (Czech Republic) Skoda Motorsport | Skoda Octavia WRC | P |

=== Itinerary ===
All dates and times are EAT (UTC+3).

| Date | No. | Time span | Stage name | Distance |
|---|---|---|---|---|
| 19 April | | 9:49 | Service A, Girona | —N/a |
| 19 April | SS1 | 10:19 | Els Angels 1 | 15.66 km |
| 19 April | SS2 | 10:46 | Santa Pellaia 1 | 11.66 km |
| 19 April | | 11:32 | Service B, Girona | —N/a |
| 19 April | SS3 | 12:41 | Coll de Bracons 1 | 19.89 km |
| 19 April | SS4 | 13:20 | La Trona 1 | 12.86 km |
| 19 April | | 14:23 | Service C, Manlleu | —N/a |
| 19 April | SS5 | 15:05 | La Fullaca - Arbucies 1 | 32.64 km |
| 19 April | SS6 | 15:53 | Cladells 1 | 15.27 km |
| 19 April | | 16:48 | Service D, Girona | —N/a |
| 19 April | SS7 | 17:28 | Els Angels 2 | 15.66 km |
| 19 April | SS8 | 17:55 | Santa Pellaia 2 | 11.66 km |
| 19 April | | 18:41 | Service E, Girona | —N/a |
| 20 April | | 9:35 | Service F, La Selva del Camp | —N/a |
| 20 April | SS9 | 10:29 | Prades | 13.77 km |
| 20 April | SS10 | 11:20 | La Riba 1 | 32.86 km |
| 20 April | | 12:11 | Service G, La Selva del Camp | —N/a |
| 20 April | SS11 | 12:59 | Riudecanyes | 12.68 km |
| 20 April | SS12 | 13:20 | Santa Marina | 31.38 km |
| 20 April | | 14:17 | Service H, Mora la Nova | —N/a |
| 20 April | SS13 | 15:04 | Gratallops - Escaladei | 45.88 km |
| 20 April | | 16:34 | Service I, Mora la Nova | —N/a |
| 20 April | SS14 | 17:41 | La Riba 2 | 32.86 km |
| 20 April | | 18:36 | Service J, La Selva del Camp | —N/a |
| 21 April | | 9:38 | Service K, Manlleu | —N/a |
| 21 April | SS15 | 10:31 | Coll de Santigosa | 10.62 km |
| 21 April | SS16 | 11:07 | Coll de Bracons 2 | 19.89 km |
| 21 April | SS17 | 11:46 | La Trona 2 | 12.86 km |
| 21 April | | 12:49 | Service L, Manlleu | —N/a |
| 21 April | SS18 | 13:31 | La Fullaca - Arbucies 2 | 32.64 km |
| 21 April | SS19 | 14:19 | Cladells 2 | 15.27 km |
| 21 April | | 15:11 | Service M, Lloret de Mar | —N/a |

== Report ==
=== Overall ===
==== Summary ====
The winner was Philippe Bugalski aboard a Citroën Xsara Kit Car, an unprecedented event in the world championship, since he won in a front-wheel drive car, something that had not happened in years. The Kit Cars, which were supposed to be inferior compared to the all-wheel drive of the World Rally Cars, prevailed in asphalt rallies, first in Catalonia and later in the Corsica Rally that same year. The great weight/power ratio, accompanied by the good condition of the road surface and the good weather conditions in the Spanish test, made the Kit Cars prevail over their rivals.

Although Citroën did not officially compete in 1999, it had been developing the Citroën Xsara Kit Car for two years and after several tests in the nationals of Spain and France, it lined up two Xsaras for Bugalski and Jesús Puras in the Rally Catalunya. The Frenchman won the test, achieving the first victory of his career in the world championship. His victory aboard the Citroën Xsara Kit Car, a front-wheel drive car, raised some complaints among the official teams. Second was Didier Auriol with a Toyota Corolla WRC, which had already won the previous year, nothing could do against Bugalski's Xsara, although he finished half a minute behind his compatriot and third was Tommi Mäkinen, further away, with a Mitsubishi Lancer Evo VI, who was penalized one minute but kept third place ahead of Freddy Loix. The race could have been a one-two for Citroën, since on the first day it was dominated by Jesús Puras with the other Xsara Kit Car, who scored four scratches and led the race until in the first section of the second day he suffered an electrical fault in his car and had to leave. Bugalski relieved Puras at the head of the race and kept it until the end.

Among the most prominent retirements were Carlos Sainz, Auriol's teammate, who retired in the last section due to a fault with the alternator belt and Colin McRae who retired after the second day. It was also the debut in the world championship for the Frenchman Sébastien Loeb who ran with a Citroën Saxo but did not end up suffering an accident in section eight.

One of the most controversial moments outside the race was the confrontation on the sets of Canal+, which was broadcasting the race, between Jesús Puras and Juanjo Lacalle, Sainz's manager. Puras defended himself against the accusations of Luis Moya, Sainz's co-driver, of having trained illegally, and had a small verbal dispute with Lacalle.

==== Classification ====
| Position | No. | Driver | Co-driver | Entrant | Car | Time | Difference | Points |
|---|---|---|---|---|---|---|---|---|
| 1 | 16 | (France) Philippe Bugalski | (France) Jean-Paul Chiaroni | (France) Automobiles Citroen | Citroen Xsara | 4:13:45.6 | 0.0 | 10 |
| 2 | 4 | (France) Didier Auriol | (France) Denis Giraudet | (Japan) Toyota Castrol Team | Toyota Corolla WRC | 4:14:17.4 | +31.8 | 6 |
| 3 | 1 | (Finland) Tommi Makinen | (Finland) Risto Mannisenmaki | (Japan) Marlboro Mitsubishi Ralliart | Mitsubishi Lancer Evo VI | 4:16:06.7 | +2:21.1 | 4 |
| 4 | 2 | (Belgium) Freddy Loix | (Belgium) Sven Smeets | (Japan) Marlboro Mitsubishi Ralliart | Mitsubishi Carisma GT Evo VI | 4:16:21.0 | +2:35.4 | 3 |
| 5 | 5 | (United Kingdom) Richard Burns | (United Kingdom) Robert Reid | (Japan) Subaru World Rally Team | Subaru Impreza S5 WRC 99 | 4:17:45.5 | +4:01.9 | 2 |
| 6 | 14 | (Finland) Juha Kankkunen | (Finland) Juha Repo | (Japan) Subaru World Rally Team | Subaru Impreza S5 WRC 99 | 4:18:32.9 | +4:47.3 | 1 |
| 7 | 6 | (Belgium) Bruno Thiry | (Belgium) Stephane Prevot | (Japan) Subaru World Rally Team | Subaru Impreza S5 WRC 99 | 44:18:46.9 | +5:01.3 | 0 |
| 8 | 19 | (Spain) Oriol Gomez | (Spain) Oriol Julia Pascual | (Spain) Renault Sport Espana | Renault Megane Maxi | 4:19:34.3 | +5:48.7 | 0 |
| 9 | 25 | (Spain) Asensio Luis Clement | (Spain) Alex Romani | (Spain) Valencia Terra y Mar | Subaru Impreza S5 WRC 98 | 10:08:24 | +1:26:45 | 0 |
| 10 | 10 | (Italy) Piero Liatti | (Italy) Carlo Cassina | (Spain) SEAT Sport | SEAT Cordoba WRC | 4:20:53.0 | +7:07.4 | 0 |
| 11 | 26 | (Turkey) Volkan Isik | (Turkey) Erkan Bodur | Toyota Mobil Team Turkey | Toyota Corolla WRC | 4:25:39.5 | +11:53.9 | 0 |
| 12 | 22 | (Spain) Luis Monzon | (Spain) Jose Carlos Deniz | (Spain) Luis Monzon | Peugeot 306 Maxi | 4:26:52.5 | +13:06.9 | 0 |
| 13 | 28 | (Saudi Arabia) Abdullah Bakhashab | (United Kingdom) Michael Park | Toyota Team Saudi Arabia | Toyota Corolla WRC | 4:26:58.8 | +13:13.2 | 0 |
| 14 | 9 | (Finland) Harri Rovanpera | (Finland) Risto Pietilainen | (Spain) SEAT Sport | SEAT Cordoba WRC | 4:28:49.8 | +15:04.2 | 0 |
| 15 | 42 | (Spain) David Guixeras | (Spain) Jordi Mercader | (Spain) Escuderia Costa Brava | Citroen Saxo | 4:31:05.6 | +17:20.0 | 0 |
| 16 | 39 | (Spain) Javier Azcona | (Spain) Ezequiel Nazabal | (Spain) Javier Azcona | Peugeot 106 Maxi | 4:32:48.2 | +19:02.6 | 0 |
| 17 | 34 | (Oman) Hamed Al-Wahaibi | (New Zealand) Tony Sircombe | Team Mitsubishi Oman | Mitsubishi Lancer Evo V | 4:36:18.3 | +22:32.7 | 0 |
| 18 | 55 | (Italy) Giovanni Mandrinato | (Italy) Claudio Condotta | (Italy) Giovanni Mandrinato | Mitsubishi Lancer Evo V | 4:36:41.2 | +22:55.6 | 0 |
| 19 | 27 | (Germany) Osilde Holderied | (France) Catherine Francois | (Germany) Toyota Castrol Deutschland | Toyota Corolla WRC | 4:38:45.7 | +25:00.1 | 0 |
| 20 | 30 | (Uruguay) Gustavo Trelles | (Argentina) Martin Christie | (Italy) Ralliart Italia | Mitsubishi Lancer Evo V | 4:39:21.8 | +25:36.2 | 0 |
| 21 | 24 | (Japan) Toshihiro Arai | (United Kingdom) Roger Freeman | (Japan) Subaru Allstars Endless Sport | Subaru Impreza S5 WRC 98 | 4:39:39.7 | +25:54.1 | 0 |
| 22 | 56 | (Czech Republic) Michal Gargulak | (Czech Republic) Jiri Malcik | (Czech Republic) Slovnaft Rally Team | Mitsubishi Carisma GT Evo V | 4:42:53.3 | +29:07.7 | 0 |
| 23 | 45 | (France) Miguel Cristovao | (France) Joao Luz | (United Kingdom) Ford Motor Co Ltd | Ford Puma | 4:43:31.8 | +29:46.2 | 0 |
| 24 | 43 | (France) Fabien Vericel | (France) Vincent Ducher | Equipe de France FFSA | Citroen Saxo | 4:44:13.1 | +30:27.5 | 0 |
| 25 | 40 | (Andorra) Dabad Joan Vinyes | (Spain) Xavier Lorza | (Andorra) Escuderia Voltrega | Citroen Saxo | 4:45:01.3 | +31:15.7 | 0 |
| 26 | 33 | (Australia) Michael Guest | (Australia) David Green | (Australia) Winfield World Rally Team | Subaru Impreza WRX | 4:46:22.0 | +32:36.4 | 0 |
| 27 | 57 | (New Zealand) Reece Jones | (New Zealand) Leo Bult | (New Zealand) Reece Jones Rallysport | Mitsubishi Lancer Evo V | 4:47:24.4 | +33:38.8 | 0 |
| 28 | 54 | (Italy) Corrado Fontana | (Italy) Daniele Pelliccioni | (Italy) Corrado Fontana | Mitsubishi Lancer Evo V | 4:48:06.4 | +34:20.8 | 0 |
| 29 | 100 | (Spain) Cernadas Amador Vidal | (Spain) Francisco Lema Vidal | (Spain) Escuderia La Coruna | Peugeot 106 Rallye | 4:51:38.6 | +37:53.0 | 0 |
| 30 | 50 | (Andorra) Ferran Font | (Spain) Joan Sureda | (Andorra) Ferran Font | Mitsubishi Lancer Evo V | 4:51:58.4 | +38:12.8 | 0 |
| 31 | 99 | (Spain) Leonardo Saban | (Spain) Victoria Ocariz Maria | (Spain) JLM Team | Peugeot 106 Rallye | 4:52:20.5 | +38:34.9 | 0 |
| 32 | 102 | (Spain) Marc Blazquez | (Spain) Antoni Sanchez | (Spain) RACC Motorsport | Peugeot 106 Rallye | 4:52:51.5 | +39:05.9 | 0 |
| 33 | 82 | (Spain) Manuel Cabo | (Spain) Rodriguez Francisco Rodriguez | (Spain) Manuel Cabo | SEAT Ibiza GTi 16V | 4:53:23.7 | +39:38.1 | 0 |
| 34 | 97 | (Spain) Roberto Solis | (Spain) Javier Alvarez Machado Francisco | (Spain) Roberto Solis | Peugeot 106 Rallye | 4:54:06.5 | +40:20.9 | 0 |
| 35 | 35 | (Finland) Juha Kangas | (Finland) Mika Ovaskainen | (Finland) Juha Kangas | Subaru Impreza WRX | 4:54:33.2 | +40:47.6 | 0 |
| 36 | 98 | (Spain) Flavio Alonso | (Spain) Rodriguez Victor Perez | (Spain) Flavio Alonso | Peugeot 106 Rallye | 4:57:41.6 | +43:56.0 | 0 |
| 37 | 75 | (Spain) Joan Compte | (Spain) Jordi Estaper | (Spain) Escuderia Costa Daurada | Mitsubishi Lancer Evo V | 4:58:09.9 | +44:24.3 | 0 |
| 38 | 61 | (Spain) Esteban Vallin | (Spain) Eduardo Escolano | (Spain) Carlos Sainz Junior Team | SEAT Ibiza GTi 16V | 4:58:50.3 | +45:04.7 | 0 |
| 39 | 59 | (Spain) Salvador Canellas | (Spain) Carlos del Barrio | (Spain) Salvador Canellas | SEAT Ibiza GTi 16V | 4:59:25.6 | +45:40.0 | 0 |
| 40 | 104 | (Spain) Dani Sola | (Spain) Jorge Carvalho | (Spain) RACC Motorsport | Peugeot 106 Rallye | 5:00:30.7 | +46:45.1 | 0 |
| 41 | 51 | (Spain) Ignacio Sanfilippo | (Spain) Jose Vicente Medina | (Spain) Ignacio Sanfilippo | Mitsubishi Carisma GT Evo IV | 5:00:46.5 | +47:00.9 | 0 |
| 42 | 111 | (Spain) Alex Juaneda | (Spain) Daniel Guirro | (Spain) Gamace MC Competicion | Peugeot 106 Rallye | 5:01:07.0 | +47:21.4 | 0 |
| 43 | 108 | (Spain) Jonathan de Miguel | (Spain) Oscar Cabezas | (Spain) Jonathan de Miguel | Peugeot 106 Rallye | 5:01:59.7 | +48:14.1 | 0 |
| 44 | 103 | (Spain) Francisco Roig Paco | (Spain) Ignazio Paz | (Spain) Francisco Roig Paco | Peugeot 106 Rallye | 5:02:17.6 | +48:32.0 | 0 |
| 45 | 106 | (Spain) Lopez Rafael Penalva | (Spain) Miguel Angel Castro | (Spain) Lopez Rafael Penalva | Peugeot 106 Rallye | 5:03:02.2 | +49:16.6 | 0 |
| 46 | 109 | (Spain) Eloy Entrecanales | (Spain) Jose Manuel Cobo | (Spain) JLM Team | Peugeot 106 Rallye | 5:05:23.9 | +51:38.3 | 0 |
| 47 | 107 | (Spain) Emilio Segura | (Spain) Jose Antonio Munoz | (Spain) Emilio Segura | Peugeot 106 Rallye | 5:06:10.4 | +52:24.8 | 0 |
| 48 | 71 | (Germany) Michael Kahlfuss | (Germany) Ronald Bauer | (Germany) Michael Kahlfuss | Toyota Celica GT-Four | 5:07:53.9 | +54:08.3 | 0 |
| 49 | 96 | (Spain) Max Gerpe | (Spain) Sergi Oms | (Spain) Escuderia Motor Terrassa | SEAT Ibiza GTi 16V | 5:08:26.3 | +54:40.7 | 0 |
| 50 | 91 | (Spain) Mercadal Joan Vidal | (Spain) Gabriel Roig | (Spain) Mercadal Joan Vidal | SEAT Ibiza GTi 16V | 5:09:41.4 | +55:55.8 | 0 |
| 51 | 70 | (Portugal) Paulo Freire | (Portugal) Armando Veiga | (Portugal) Paulo Freire | Toyota Celica GT-Four | 5:15:22.1 | +1:01:36.5 | 0 |
| 52 | 95 | (Spain) Josep Nicolas | (Spain) Rafael Puig | (Spain) Biela Club Manresa | SEAT Ibiza GTi 16V | 5:19:14.6 | +1:05:29.0 | 0 |
| 53 | 67 | (United Kingdom) Graeme Presswell | (United Kingdom) Martin Saunders | (United Kingdom) Graeme Presswell | Vauxhall Astra | 5:27:47.5 | +1:14:01.9 | 0 |
| 54 | 110 | (Spain) Escola Jaume Darne | (Spain) V. Jaume Darne | (Spain) Escuderia Motor Terrassa | Peugeot 106 Rallye | 5:32:06.2 | +1:18:20.6 | 0 |
| 55 | 87 | (Spain) Miguel Diego | (Spain) Jose Ivan Caballero | (Spain) A.C. Principado de Asturias | SEAT Ibiza GTi 16V | 5:35:37.6 | +1:21:52.0 | 0 |
| 56 | 80 | (United Kingdom) Iain Henderson | (United Kingdom) Graham Hopewell | (United Kingdom) Iain Henderson | Citroen Saxo VTS | 5:54:45.2 | +1:40:59.6 | 0 |
| Retired SS19 | 3 | (Spain) Carlos Sainz | (Spain) Luis Moya | (Japan) Toyota Castrol Team | Toyota Corolla WRC | Alternator | | 0 |
| Retired SS18 | 18 | (Denmark) Henrik Lundgaard | (Denmark) Freddy Pedersen | (Denmark) Henrik Lundgaard | Toyota Corolla WRC | Accident | | 0 |
| Retired SS17 | 74 | (Spain) Antonio Garrido | (Spain) Jose Alfredo Alvarez | (Spain) Antonio Garrido | Subaru Impreza WRX | Retired | | 0 |
| Retired S16 | 23 | (United Kingdom) Alister McRae | (United Kingdom) David Senior | (South Korea) Hyundai Motorsport | Hyundai Coupe Kit Car Evo2 | Transmission | | 0 |
| Retired SS15 | 7 | (United Kingdom) Colin McRae | (United Kingdom) Nicky Grist | (United Kingdom) Ford Motor Co Ltd | Ford Focus WRC 99 | Withdrawn | | 0 |
| Retired SS15 | 65 | (Netherlands) Francois Koopal | (Netherlands) Hans Bullens | (Netherlands) Francois Koopal | Renault Clio Maxi | Retired | | 0 |
| Retired SS15 | 90 | (Spain) Alberto San Segundo | (Spain) Eva Navas | (Spain) Alberto San Segundo | SEAT Ibiza GTi 16V | Mechanical | | 0 |
| Retired SS15 | 92 | (Spain) Alex Palet | (Spain) Xavier Calatayud | (Spain) Alex Palet | SEAT Ibiza GTi 16V | Mechanical | | 0 |
| Retired SS14 | 11 | (Germany) Armin Schwarz | (Germany) Manfred Hiemer | (Czech Republic) Skoda Motorsport | Skoda Octavia WRC | Electrical | | 0 |
| Retired SS14 | 49 | (Austria) Kris Rosenberger | (Sweden) Per Carlsson | (Austria) Kris Rosenberger | Mitsubishi Lancer Evo IV | Accident | | 0 |
| Retired SS14 | 62 | (Spain) Txus Jaio | (Spain) David Moreno | (Spain) Carlos Sainz Junior Team | SEAT Ibiza GTi 16V | Mechanical | | 0 |
| Retired SS14 | 68 | (Italy) Marta Candian | (Italy) Mara Biotti | (Italy) Hawk Racing Club Srl | Renault Clio Williams | Retired | | 0 |
| Retired SS13 | 8 | (France) Simon Jean-Joseph | (United Kingdom) Fred Gallagher | (United Kingdom) Ford Motor Co Ltd | Ford Focus WRC 99 | Engine | | 0 |
| Retired SS13 | 21 | (Sweden) Kenneth Eriksson | (Sweden) Staffan Parmander | (South Korea) Hyundai Motorsport | Hyundai Coupe Kit Car Evo2 | Fuel Pump | | 0 |
| Retired SS13 | 41 | (Spain) Jan Casais | (Spain) Jose Enrique Serrano | (Spain) Jan Casais | Citroen Saxo | Retired | | 0 |
| Retired SS13 | 46 | (Italy) Andrea Maselli | (Italy) Nicola Arena | (Italy) Andrea Maselli | Renault Clio Maxi | Lost Wheel | | 0 |
| Retired SS13 | 69 | (Spain) Antonio Seriola | (Spain) Joan Angel Alpiste | (Spain) Escuderia Baix Emporda | Peugeot 106 Rallye | Retired | | 0 |
| Retired SS13 | 76 | (Spain) Toni Vidal | (Spain) Jordi Padris | (Spain) Toni Vidal | Peugeot 306 S16 | Retired | | 0 |
| Retired SS13 | 11 | (France) Luc Escharavil | (France) Herve Michevas | (France) Luc Escharavil | Renault Clio Williams | Retired | | 0 |
| Retired SS13 | 79 | (France) Marc Allingue | (Spain) Josep Fornell | (France) Marc Allingue | Peugeot 106 Rallye | Retired | | 0 |
| Retired SS13 | 83 | (Spain) Alfonso Loza | (Spain) Giovanni Breda | (Spain) Alfonso Loza | SEAT Ibiza GTi 16V | Mechanical | | 0 |
| Retired SS12 | 12 | (Czech Republic) Pavel Sibera | (Czech Republic) Petr Gross | (Czech Republic) Skoda Motorsport | Skoda Octavia WRC | Fire | | 0 |
| Retired SS12 | 20 | (Spain) Manuel Muniente | (Spain) Diego Vallejo | (Spain) Peugeot Sport Espana | Peugeot 306 Maxi | Engine | | 0 |
| Retired SS12 | 53 | (Italy) Gianluigi Galli | (Italy) Guido D'Amore | (Italy) Gianluigi Galli | Mitsubishi Carisma GT Evo V | Accident | | 0 |
| Retired SS12 | 58 | (Denmark) Kristian Poulsen | (Denmark) Leif Heick | (Denmark) Kristian Poulsen | Ford Escort WRC | Retired | | 0 |
| Retired SS12 | 88 | (Spain) Juan Pablo Castro Iglesias | (Spain) Manuel Alberto Gomez Bancalero | (Spain) Juan Pablo Castro Iglesias | SET Ibiza GTi 16V | Mechanical | | 0 |
| Retired SS11 | 105 | (Spain) Sergio Lopez-Fombona | (Spain) Manuel David Tajada | (Spain) A.C. Principado de Asturias | Peugeot 106 Rallye | Accident | | 0 |
| Retired SS10 | 64 | (Germany) Paul Niemczyk | (Germany) Thomas Schunemann | (Germany) Paul Niemczyk | Ford Escort RS Cosworth | Retired | | 0 |
| Retired SS9 | 17 | (Spain) Jesus Puras | (Spain) Marc Marti | (Spain) Citroen Hispana | Citroen Xsara | Electrical | | 0 |
| Retired SS9 | 94 | (Spain) Hector Soler Libori | (Spain) Raul Soler Libori | (Spain) Hector Soler Libori | SEAT Ibiza GTi 16V | Retired | | 0 |
| Retired SS8 | 37 | (France) Mark Champeau | (France) Gilles Thimonier | (France) Mark Champeau | Subaru Impreza S5 WRC 98 | Accident | | 0 |
| Retired SS8 | 44 | (France) Sébastien Loeb | (Monaco) Daniel Elena | Equipe de France FFSA | Citroen Saxo | Accident | | 0 |
| Retired SS8 | 66 | (Switzerland) Rodolfo Esposito | (Switzerland) Lucie Conod | (Switzerland) Rodolfo Esposito | Citroen ZX 16S | Retired | | 0 |
| Retired SS7 | 36 | (Sweden) Pernilla Solberg | (Sweden) Ulrika Mattsson | (Sweden) Team Walfridsson | Mitsubishi Lancer Evo V | Steering | | 0 |
| Retired SS7 | 48 | (Uruguay) Gabriel Mendez | (Uruguay) Daniel Muzio | (Uruguay) Gabriel Mendez | Mitsubishi Lancer Evo V | Retired | | 0 |
| Retired SS6 | 52 | (Spain) Miguel Martinez-Conde | (Spain) Felipe Alonso Fernandez | (Spain) JLM Team | Mitsubishi Carisma GT Evo V | Mechanical | | 0 |
| Retired SS6 | 81 | (Finland) Toni Kuusela | (Finland) Ossi Lehtonen | (Finland) Toni Kuusela | Citroen ZX 16S | Retired | | 0 |
| Retired SS6 | 101 | (Spain) Ojeda Enrique Garcia | (Spain) Pilar Barcelo | (Spain) JLM Team | Peugeot 106 Rallye | Retired | | 0 |
| Retired SS5 | 31 | (Austria) Manfred Stohl | (Germany) Kay Gerlach | (Austria) Manfred Stohl | Mitsubishi Lancer Evo V | Engine | | 0 |
| Retired SS5 | 93 | (Spain) Joan Font | (Spain) Arcadi Font | (Spain) Joan Font | SEAT Ibiza GTi 16V | Mechanical | | 0 |
| Retired SS4 | 78 | (Germany) Karl-Friedrich Beck | (Germany) Michael Kolbach | (Germany) Karl-Friedrich Beck | Renault Clio Williams | Retired | | 0 |
| Retired SS4 | 84 | (Spain) Espinosa Francisco Puertas | (Spain) Marcos Rumi | (Spain) Espinosa Francisco Puertas | SEAT Ibiza GTi 16V | Mechanical | | 0 |
| Retired SS3 | 32 | (Finland) Jouko Puhakka | (Finland) Jakke Honkanen | (Japan) Tyre Research Institute | Mitsubishi Lancer Evo V | Mechanical | | 0 |
| Retired SS3 | 63 | (Spain) Oscar Fuertes | (Spain) Lucas Cruz | (Spain) Carlos Sainz Junior Team | SEAT Ibiza GTi 16V Evo2 | Retired | | 0 |
| Retired SS3 | 72 | (Belgium) Bob Colsoul | (Belgium) Tom Colsoul | (Belgium) Bob Colsoul | Mitsubishi Lancer Evo V | Retired | | 0 |
| Retired SS3 | 73 | (Portugal) Carlos Marques | (Portugal) Luis Cavaleiro | (Portugal) Carlos Marques | Mitsubishi Lancer Evo III | Retired | | 0 |
| Retired SS3 | 86 | (Spain) Lopez Javier Penalva | (Spain) Javier Gonzalez | (Spain) Lopez Javier Penalva | SEAT Ibiza GTi 16V | Mechanical | | 0 |
| Retired SS2 | 47 | (France) Priscille De Belloy-Delecour | (France) Christiane Nicolet | (United Kingdom) Ford Motor Co Ltd | Ford Puma | Retired | | 0 |
| Retired SS2 | 60 | (Spain) Michael Huete | (Spain) Colon Xavier Amigo | (Spain) Carlos Sainz Junior Team | SEAT Ibiza GTi 16V Evo2 | Retired | | 0 |
| Retired SS2 | 85 | (Spain) Daniel Loza | (Spain) Silvia Serrano | (Spain) Daniel Loza | SEAT Ibiza GTi 16V | Retired | | 0 |
| Retired SS2 | 89 | (Spain) Jose Manuel Porto | (Spain) Antonio Garcia | (Spain) Jose Manuel Porto | SEAT Ibiza GTi 16V | Mechanical | | 0 |

==== Special Stages ====
All dates and times are CEST (UTC+2).

| Day | Stage | Time | Name | Length (km) | Winner | Time | Rally leader |
|---|---|---|---|---|---|---|---|
| 1 19 Apr | SS1 | 10:19 | Els Angels 1 | 15.66 | (Finland) Tommi Makinen | 9:50.7 | (Finland) Tommi Makinen |
| 1 19 Apr | SS2 | 10:46 | Santa Pellaia 1 | 11.66 | (Spain) Jesus Puras | 7:42.6 | (Spain) Jesus Puras |
| 1 19 Apr | SS3 | 12:41 | Coll de Bracons 1 | 19.89 | (Spain) Jesus Puras | 13:02.1 | (Spain) Jesus Puras |
| 1 19 Apr | SS4 | 13:20 | La Trona 1 | 12.86 | (Finland) Tommi Makinen | 8:31.5 | (Spain) Jesus Puras |
| 1 19 Apr | SS5 | 15:05 | La Fullaca - Arbucies 1 | 32.64 | (Spain) Jesus Puras | 20:28.4 | (Spain) Jesus Puras |
| 1 19 Apr | SS6 | 15:53 | Cladells 1 | 15.27 | (France) Didier Auriol | 10:00.8 | (Spain) Jesus Puras |
| 1 19 Apr | SS7 | 17:28 | Els Angels 2 | 15.66 | (France) Didier Auriol | 10:03.5 | (Spain) Jesus Puras |
| 1 19 Apr | SS8 | 17:55 | Santa Pellaia 2 | 11.66 | (Spain) Jesus Puras | 7:43.7 | (Spain) Jesus Puras |
| 2 20 Apr | SS9 | 10:29 | Prades | 13.77 | (France) Philippe Bugalski | 8:17.1 | (France) Philippe Bugalski |
| 2 20 Apr | SS10 | 11:20 | La Riba 1 | 32.86 | (United Kingdom) Colin McRae | 20:33.4 | (France) Philippe Bugalski |
| 2 20 Apr | SS11 | 12:59 | Riudecanyes | 12.68 | (France) Didier Auriol | 8:52.8 | (France) Philippe Bugalski |
| 2 20 Apr | SS12 | 13:20 | Santa Marina | 31.38 | (France) Philippe Bugalski | 19:18.2 | (France) Philippe Bugalski |
| 2 20 Apr | SS13 | 15:04 | Gratallops - Escaladei | 45.88 | (France) Philippe Bugalski | 29:08.9 | (France) Philippe Bugalski |
| 2 20 Apr | SS14 | 17:41 | La Riba 2 | 32.86 | (United Kingdom) Colin McRae | 20:37.8 | (France) Philippe Bugalski |
| 3 21 Apr | SS15 | 10:31 | Coll de Santigosa | 10.62 | (Finland) Tommi Makinen | 6:49.2 | (France) Philippe Bugalski |
| 3 21 Apr | SS16 | 11:07 | Coll de Bracons 2 | 19.89 | (Finland) Tommi Makinen | 13:08.8 | (France) Philippe Bugalski |
| 3 21 Apr | SS17 | 11:46 | La Trona 2 | 12.86 | (France) Philippe Bugalski | 8:31.3 | (France) Philippe Bugalski |
| 3 21 Apr | SS18 | 13:31 | La Fullaca - Arbucies 2 | 32.64 | (France) Philippe Bugalski | 20:24.9 | (France) Philippe Bugalski |
| 3 21 Apr | SS19 | 14:19 | Cladells 2 | 15.27 | (France) Didier Auriol | 10:08.3 | (France) Philippe Bugalski |

==== Championship Standings ====
| Pos. | Drivers' Championship | | | Manufacturers' Championship | | |
| Pos. | Move | Driver | Points | Move | Manufacturer | Points |
|---|---|---|---|---|---|---|
| 1 | | (Finland) Tommi Makinen | 26 | | (Japan) Toyota Castrol Team | 43 |
| 2 | 1 | (France) Didier Auriol | 23 | 1 | (Japan) Marlboro Mitsubishi Ralliart | 32 |
| 3 | 1 | (United Kingdom) Colin McRae | 20 | 1 | (United Kingdom) Ford Motor Co Ltd | 28 |
| 4 | | (Spain) Carlos Sainz | 16 | | (Japan) Subaru World Rally Team | 18 |
| 5 | 10 | (France) Philippe Bugalski | 10 | | (Spain) SEAT Sport | 8 |
