= Jesús Puras =

Spanish rally driver (born 1963)

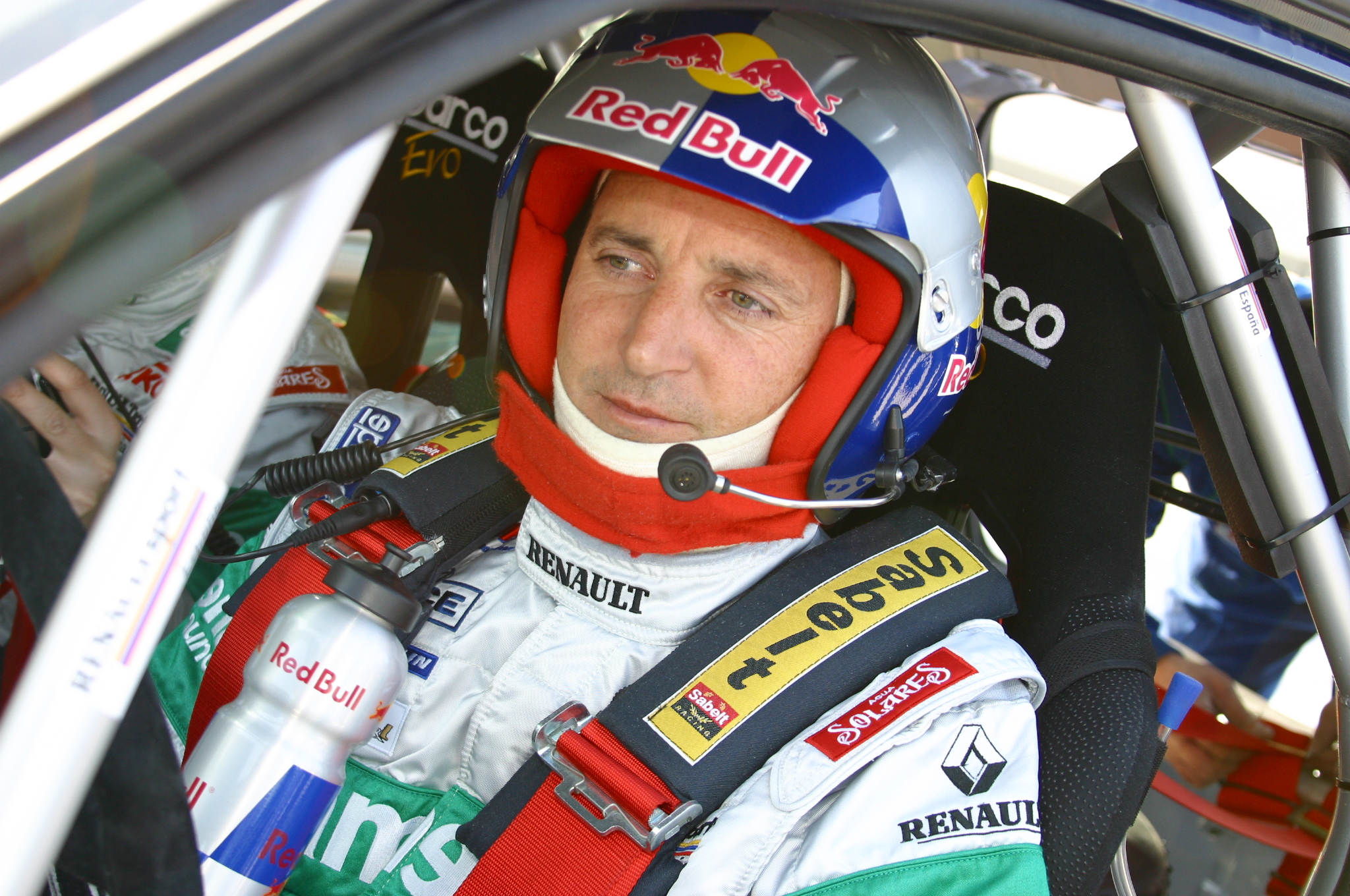

Personal information
- Nationality: (Spain) Spanish
- Full name: Jesús Puras Vidal de la Peña
- Born: March 16, 1963 (age 63); Santander, Cantabria

World Rally Championship record
- Years active: 1991–1992, 1994–2002
- Co-driver: (Spain) José Arrarte (Spain) Álex Romaní (Spain) Carlos del Barrio (Spain) Marc Martí
- Teams: Mazda, Citroën
- Rallies: 37
- Championships: 0
- Rally wins: 1
- Podiums: 2
- Stage wins: 25
- Total points: 32
- First rally: 1991 Monte Carlo Rally
- First win: 2001 Tour de Corse
- Last win: 2001 Tour de Corse
- Last rally: 2002 Rallye Sanremo

Jesús Puras Vidal de la Peña (born March 16 1963), also known as 'Chus Puras', is a Spanish rally driver active in the World Rally Championship from 1991 to 2002. He was well known for his blistering performances on tarmac rallies.

== Career ==
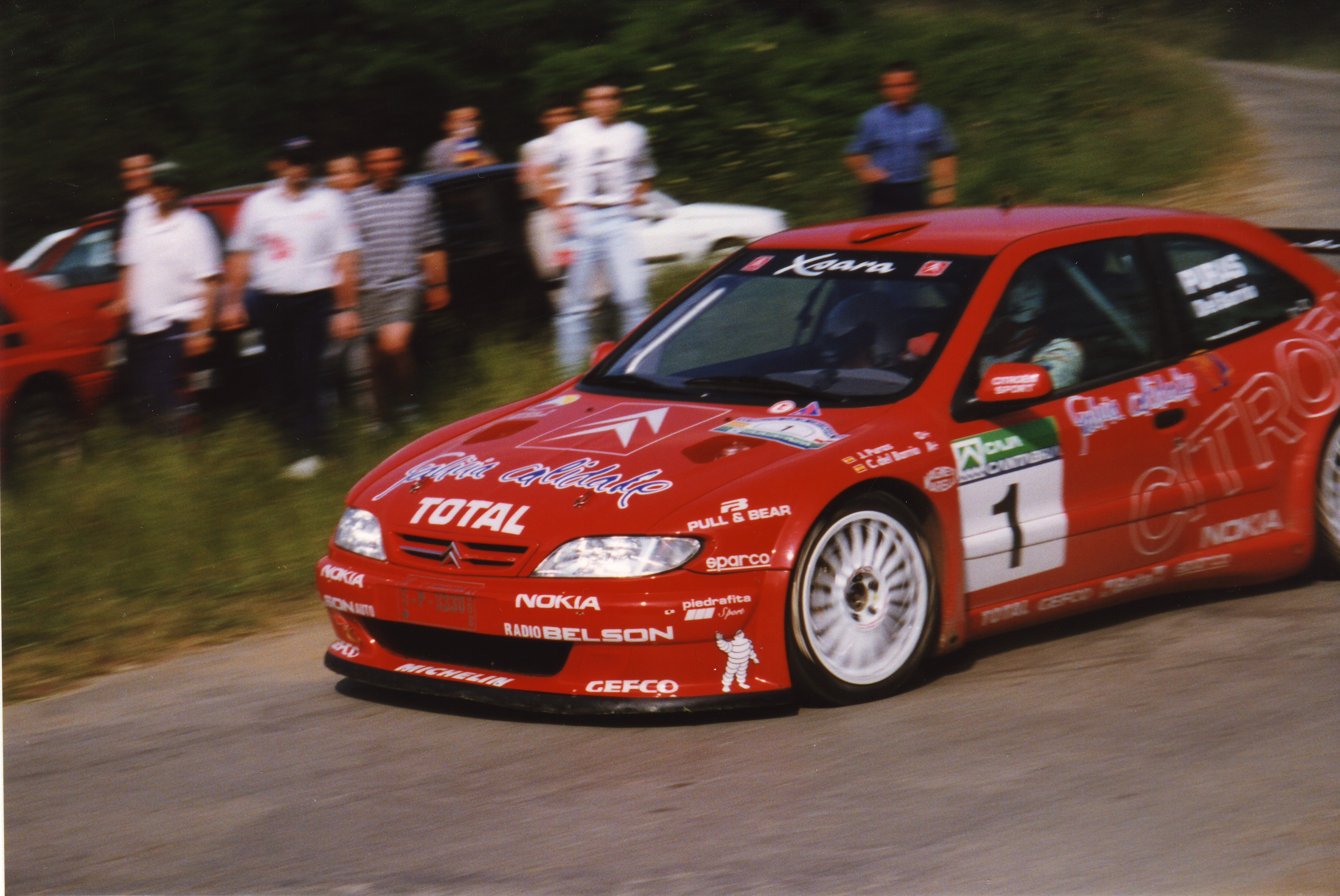
Puras driving a Citroën Xsara Kit Car at the 1998 Rallye Cantabria.

Puras debuted in rallying in 1982 and captured the Spanish Rally Championship title eight times; in 1990 and 1992 with a Lancia Delta Integrale 16V, in 1995 and 1997 with a Citroën ZX 16S, from 1998 to 2000 with a Citroën Xsara Kit Car and in 2002 with a Citroën Xsara WRC. Driving a Ford Escort RS Cosworth, he also won the 1994 FIA Group N Cup (now as World Rally Championship-3).

Along with teammate Philippe Bugalski, Puras was chosen by the Citroën Total World Rally Team to be part of their driver line-up for the first bit-part campaign with the Citroën Xsara Kit Car in 1999. He secured his only WRC win at the 2001 Tour de Corse with co-driver Marc Martí (who then went on to pilot former double world champion Carlos Sainz and in recent years, Dani Sordo) with the Citroën Xsara WRC.

However, with performances overshadowed by the upcoming Sébastien Loeb, Puras retired from the Citroën factory team and the WRC in 2002, ending with a sixth place in his last rally – the 2002 Rallye Sanremo.

== WRC victories ==
#	Event	Season	Co-driver	Car
1	45ème Tour de Corse – Rallye de France	2001	Marc Martí	Citroën Xsara WRC

== WRC results ==
Year	Entrant	Car	1	2	3	4	5	6	7	8	9	10	11	12	13	14	WDC	Pts
1991	Mazda Rally Team Europe	Mazda 323 GTX	MON; Ret	SWE	POR; 7	KEN	FRA	GRE	NZL	ARG	FIN	AUS	ITA	CIV			40th	4
1991	Jesús Puras	Lancia Delta Integrale 16V													ESP; Ret	GBR	40th	4
1992	Mauro Rallye Team	Lancia Delta HF Integrale	MON	SWE	POR	KEN	FRA	GRE	NZL	ARG	FIN	AUS	ITA	CIV	ESP; 6	GBR	34th	6
1994	Jesús Puras	Ford Escort RS Cosworth	MON; 9	POR; 8	KEN	FRA; 12	GRE	ARG; Ret	NZL; Ret	FIN	ITA; 17	GBR; 15					30th	5
1995	Citroën Hispania	Citroën ZX 16S	MON	SWE	POR	FRA	NZL	AUS	ESP; Ret	GBR							NC	0
1996	Seat Sport	Seat Ibiza Kit Car	SWE	KEN	INA	GRE	ARG; Ret	FIN	AUS; Ret	ITA	ESP; 15						NC	0
1997	Citroën Hispania	Citroën ZX Kit Car	MON	SWE	KEN	POR	ESP; Ret	FRA	ARG	GRE	NZL	FIN	INA	ITA	AUS	GBR	NC	0
1998	Automobiles Citroën	Citroën Xsara Kit Car	MON	SWE	KEN	POR	ESP; Ret	FRA	ARG	GRE	NZL	FIN	ITA; Ret	AUS	GBR		NC	0
1999	Automobiles Citroën	Citroën Xsara Kit Car	MON; Ret	SWE	KEN	POR		FRA; 2	ARG	GRE	NZL						11th	6
1999	Citroën Hispania	Citroën Xsara Kit Car					ESP; Ret										11th	6
1999	Jesús Puras	Subaru Impreza WRX										FIN; Ret					11th	6
1999	Jesús Puras	Toyota Corolla WRC											CHN; Ret			GBR; 16	11th	6
1999	Citroën Sport	Citroën Xsara Kit Car												ITA; Ret	AUS		11th	6
2000	Jesús Puras	Mitsubishi Lancer Evo VI	MON	SWE	KEN	POR; Ret					FIN; Ret	CYP					NC	0
2000	Citroën Sport	Citroën Xsara Kit Car					ESP; Ret	ARG	GRE	NZL							NC	0
2000	Jesús Puras	Citroën Saxo Kit Car											FRA; 28	ITA; 35	AUS	GBR	NC	0
2001	Jesús Puras	Citroën Saxo Kit Car	MON; Ret	SWE	POR												11th	10
2001	Automobiles Citroën	Citroën Xsara WRC				ESP; Ret	ARG	CYP	GRE	KEN	FIN	NZL	ITA; Ret	FRA; 1	AUS	GBR	11th	10
2002	BBF Citroën Sport	Citroën Xsara WRC	MON	SWE	FRA	ESP; 12	CYP	ARG	GRE	KEN	FIN						19th	1
2002	Automobiles Citroën	Citroën Xsara WRC										GER; Ret					19th	1
2002	Piedrafita Sport	Citroën Xsara WRC											ITA; 6	NZL	AUS	GBR	19th	1

Sporting positions
Preceded by Régis Laconi; Yvan Muller; Gilles Panizzi	Race of Champions; Nations' Cup; 2001 with: Fernando Alonso; Rubén Xaus	Succeeded by Colin Edwards; Jeff Gordon; Jimmie Johnson
