= Gilles Panizzi =

French rally driver (born 1965)

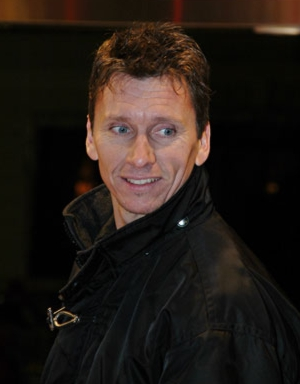
- Panizzi in 2005

Personal information
- Nationality: (France) French
- Full name: Gilles Roland Joseph Panizzi
- Born: 19 September 1965 (age 61); Roquebrune-Cap-Martin, Alpes-Maritimes, France

World Rally Championship record
- Years active: 1990–2006
- Co-driver: (France) Hervé Panizzi
- Teams: Peugeot, Mitsubishi, Skoda Motorsport
- Rallies: 71
- Championships: 0
- Rally wins: 7
- Podiums: 14
- Stage wins: 91
- Total points: 134
- First rally: 1990 Monte Carlo Rally
- First win: 2000 Tour de Corse
- Last win: 2003 Rally Catalunya
- Last rally: 2006 Rally Catalunya

Gilles Roland Joseph Panizzi (born 19 September 1965) is a French former rally driver.

Panizzi was born in Roquebrune-Cap-Martin, Alpes-Maritimes. Like many of his fellow rally racing countrymen, Panizzi spent a great deal of his developmental driving years participating in asphalt rally events throughout his native land.

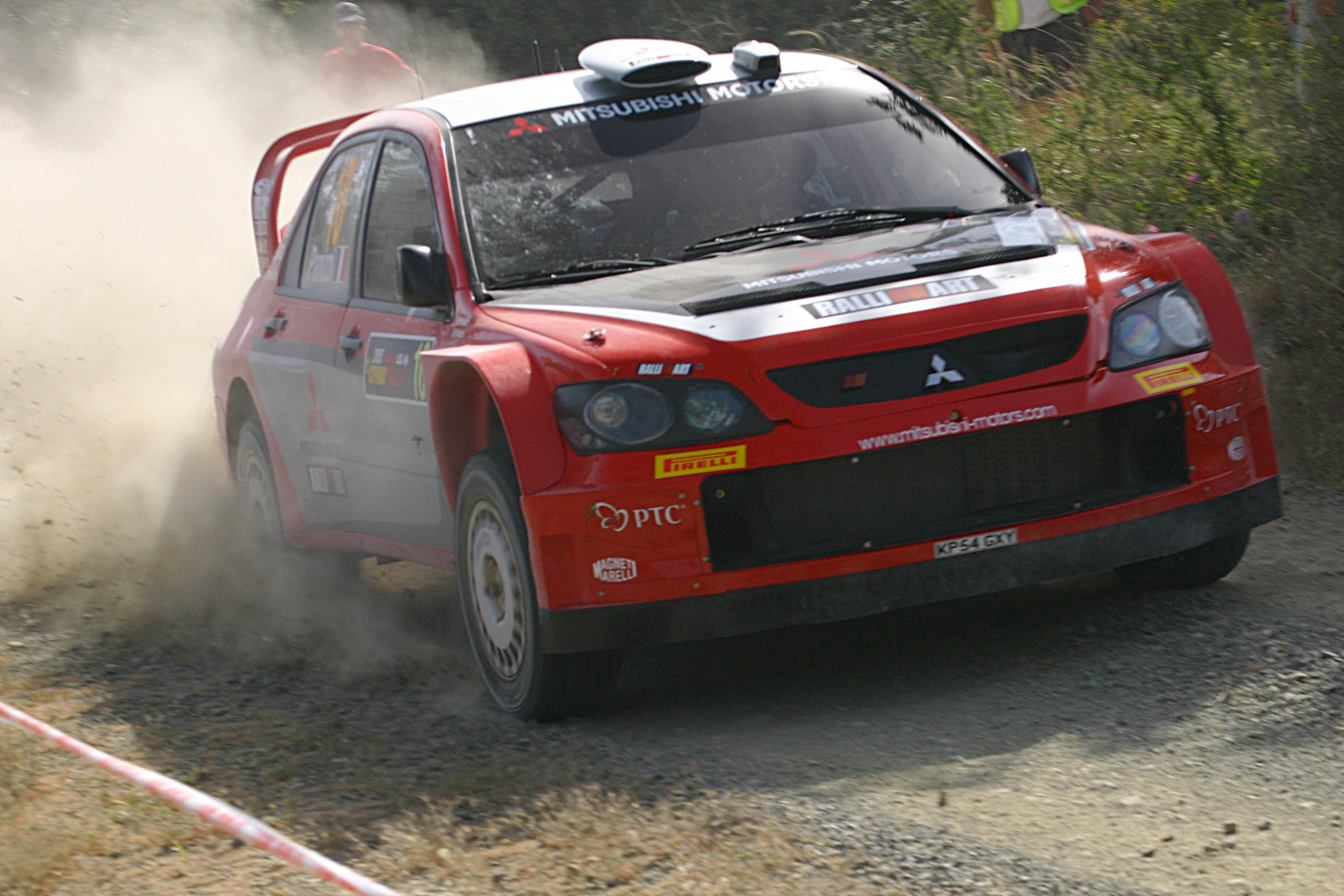
Panizzi driving a Mitsubishi Lancer Evolution at the 2005 Cyprus Rally.

In 1996 and 1997, Panizzi won the French Championship title in a Peugeot-backed (funded) 306 kit car. It was at that point that he was nominated to drive for Peugeot as their resident asphalt (tarmac/sealed-surface) expert.

Between 1999 and 2003, Panizzi had great success in his role as Peugeot's tarmac expert. He won a total of seven World Rally Championship rounds in this period - all on tarmac. However, Panizzi's inability to match his rivals pace on gravel, mud, and snow precluded him from challenging for the world title while at Peugeot. Panizzi had an embarrassing moment during the 2000 Safari Rally, where he and his brother and co-driver Hervé were behind the slower car of Argentine driver Roberto Sanchez, who had not moved over despite being ordered to do so was kicking up dust and blinding the irate Panizzi, who picked up two punctures thanks to the stones thrown up by Sanchez's car. The Panizzi brothers were so furious that after the end of the stage they both ran up to Sanchez's car, opened the door and started physically assaulting the Argentine driver, both trying to pull Sanchez out of his car. The Panizzi brothers actions landed them both a $50,000 fine. He is the only WRC driver to do a (famous) 360 spin at the Viladrau hairpin, which he did at the 2002 Rally Catalunya.

In 2004, Mitsubishi Motor Sports recruited Panizzi and his co-driver and brother, Hervé, to lead the company's charge back in the World Rally Championship.

In the 2005 season, Panizzi was replaced in the lead car by Harri Rovanperä, and guested in the second car with Gianluigi Galli. He finished third at the Monte Carlo Rally, the first event of the season, but only scored points in one other event.

In 2006, Panizzi was signed by the semi-privateer Red Bull Škoda team. Despite a strong performance in the opening rally of the season in Monte Carlo, he expressed his dissatisfaction at the performance of his car, and after a disappointing showing in Spain, he announced his departure from the team, and was replaced by his former Peugeot teammate Harri Rovanperä.

Panizzi later participated in two Intercontinental Rally Challenge events - the 2007 Rallye Sanremo with the Peugeot 207 S2000 and 2010 Rallye Sanremo with Proton Satria Neo S2000, finishing respectively 8th and 22nd.

The 2021 Rallye Mont-Blanc Morzine saw Panizzi's one-off rallying return. He used a Hyundai i20 R5, finishing 15th overall.

== WRC victories ==
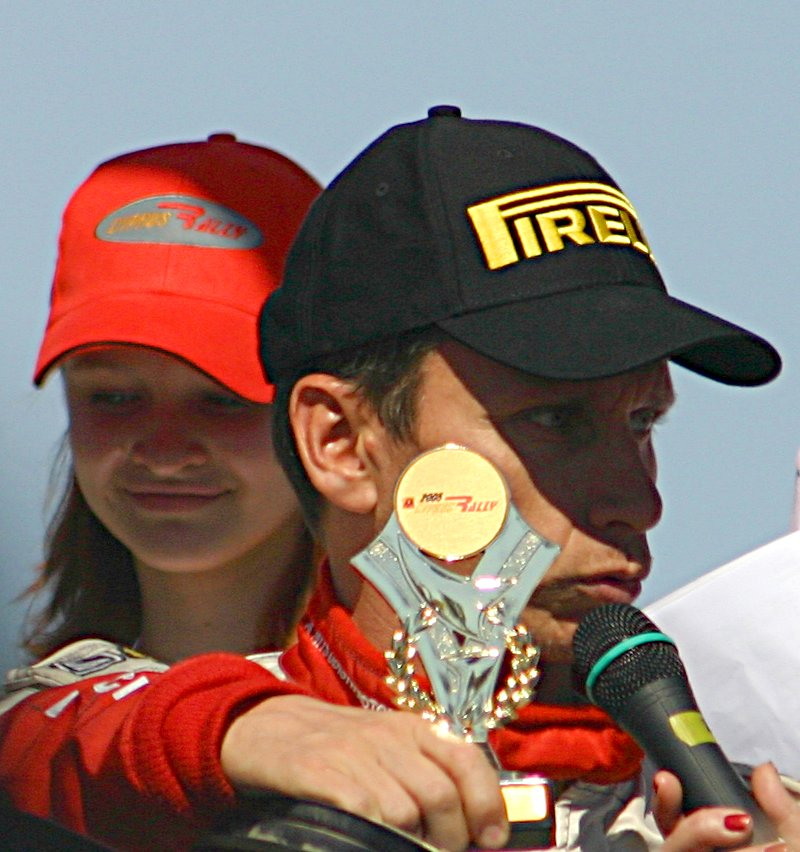
Gilles Panizzi at the 2005 Cyprus Rally

#	Event	Season	Co-driver	Car
1	44ème V-Rally Tour de Corse - Rallye de France	2000	Hervé Panizzi	Peugeot 206 WRC
2	(Italy) 42º Rallye Sanremo - Rallye d'Italia	2000	Hervé Panizzi	Peugeot 206 WRC
3	(Italy) 43º Rallye Sanremo - Rallye d'Italia	2001	Hervé Panizzi	Peugeot 206 WRC
4	46ème Rallye de France - Tour de Corse	2002	Hervé Panizzi	Peugeot 206 WRC
5	(Spain) 38º Rallye Catalunya-Costa Brava (Rallye de España)	2002	Hervé Panizzi	Peugeot 206 WRC
6	(Italy) 44º Rallye Sanremo - Rallye d'Italia	2002	Hervé Panizzi	Peugeot 206 WRC
7	(Spain) 39º Rallye Catalunya-Costa Brava (Rallye de España)	2003	Hervé Panizzi	Peugeot 206 WRC

== Complete WRC results ==
Year	Entrant	Car	1	2	3	4	5	6	7	8	9	10	11	12	13	14	15	16	WDC	Points
1990	Gilles Panizzi	Lancia Delta Integrale	MON; 16	POR	KEN	FRA	GRE	NZL	ARG	FIN	AUS	ITA	CIV	GBR					NC	0
1993	Gilles Panizzi	Peugeot 106 XSi	MON	SWE	POR	KEN	FRA; Ret	GRE	ARG	NZL	FIN	AUS	ITA	ESP	GBR				NC	0
1995	Peugeot Sport	Peugeot 306 S16	MON	SWE	POR	FRA; 12	NZL	AUS	ESP	GBR									NC	0
1997	Peugeot Sport	Peugeot 306 Maxi	MON	SWE	KEN	POR	ESP; 3	FRA; 3	ARG	GRE	NZL	FIN	IDN	ITA	AUS	GBR			10th	8
1998	Peugeot Sport	Peugeot 306 Maxi	MON; 9	SWE	KEN	POR	ESP; 6	FRA; 4	ARG	GRE	NZL		ITA; 5	AUS					12th	6
1998	Gilles Panizzi	Peugeot 106 Rallye										FIN; 35							12th	6
1998	Gilles Panizzi	Subaru Impreza WRX														GBR; Ret			12th	6
1999	Gilles Panizzi	Subaru Impreza WRC 98	MON; Ret	SWE	KEN	POR	ESP												10th	6
1999	Peugeot Esso	Peugeot 206 WRC						FRA; Ret	ARG	GRE	NZL	FIN; 33	CHN	ITA; 2	AUS	GBR; 7			10th	6
2000	Peugeot Esso	Peugeot 206 WRC	MON; Ret	SWE	KEN; Ret	POR	ESP; 6	ARG	GRE	NZL	FIN	CYP	FRA; 1	ITA; 1	AUS; Ret	GBR; 8			7th	21
2001	Peugeot Total	Peugeot 206 WRC	MON; Ret	SWE		ESP; 2	ARG						ITA; 1	FRA; 2	AUS; 9				8th	22
2001	H.F. Grifone SRL	Peugeot 206 WRC			POR; 12			CYP; Ret	GRE; Ret	KEN	FIN; 14	NZL				GBR; Ret			8th	22
2002	Peugeot Total	Peugeot 206 WRC	MON; 7		FRA; 1	ESP; 1	CYP; 10	ARG; Ret		KEN; 6	FIN	GER	ITA; 1	NZL; 7	AUS				6th	31
2002	Bozian Racing	Peugeot 206 WRC		SWE; 16					GRE; Ret							GBR; 11			6th	31
2003	Marlboro Peugeot Total	Peugeot 206 WRC	MON; Ret	SWE						GER; 10	FIN	AUS	ITA; 2	FRA; 6	ESP; 1				10th	27
2003	Bozian Racing	Peugeot 206 WRC			TUR; 5	NZL	ARG	GRE; 7	CYP; Ret							GBR; Ret			10th	27
2004	Mitsubishi Motors	Mitsubishi Lancer WRC 04	MON; 6	SWE; Ret	MEX; 8	NZL; Ret	CYP; Ret	GRE; 10	TUR; Ret	ARG; 7	FIN; 11	GER; Ret	JPN	GBR	ITA	FRA	ESP; 12	AUS	13th	6
2005	Mitsubishi Motors	Mitsubishi Lancer WRC 05	MON; 3	SWE	MEX; 8	NZL	ITA	CYP; 11	TUR	GRE	ARG	FIN	GER	GBR	JPN; 11	FRA; Ret	ESP	AUS	15th	7
2006	Red Bull Škoda	Škoda Fabia WRC	MON; 10	SWE	MEX	ESP; 10	FRA	ARG	ITA	GRE	GER	FIN	JPN	CYP	TUR	AUS	NZL	GBR	NC	0

== Sources ==
- WRC.com - the official World Rally Championship website.
- Official Website - note: inactive as of April 2006

Sporting positions
Preceded by JJ Lehto; Tommi Mäkinen; Kari Tiainen	Race of Champions; Nations' Cup; 2000 with: Régis Laconi; Yvan Muller	Succeeded by Fernando Alonso; Jesús Puras; Rubén Xaus
Preceded by Colin Edwards; Jeff Gordon; Jimmie Johnson	Race of Champions; Nations' Cup; 2003 with: Cristiano da Matta; Fonsi Nieto	Succeeded by Jean Alesi; Sébastien Loeb
