= Citroën Xsara Kit Car =

Automobile racing

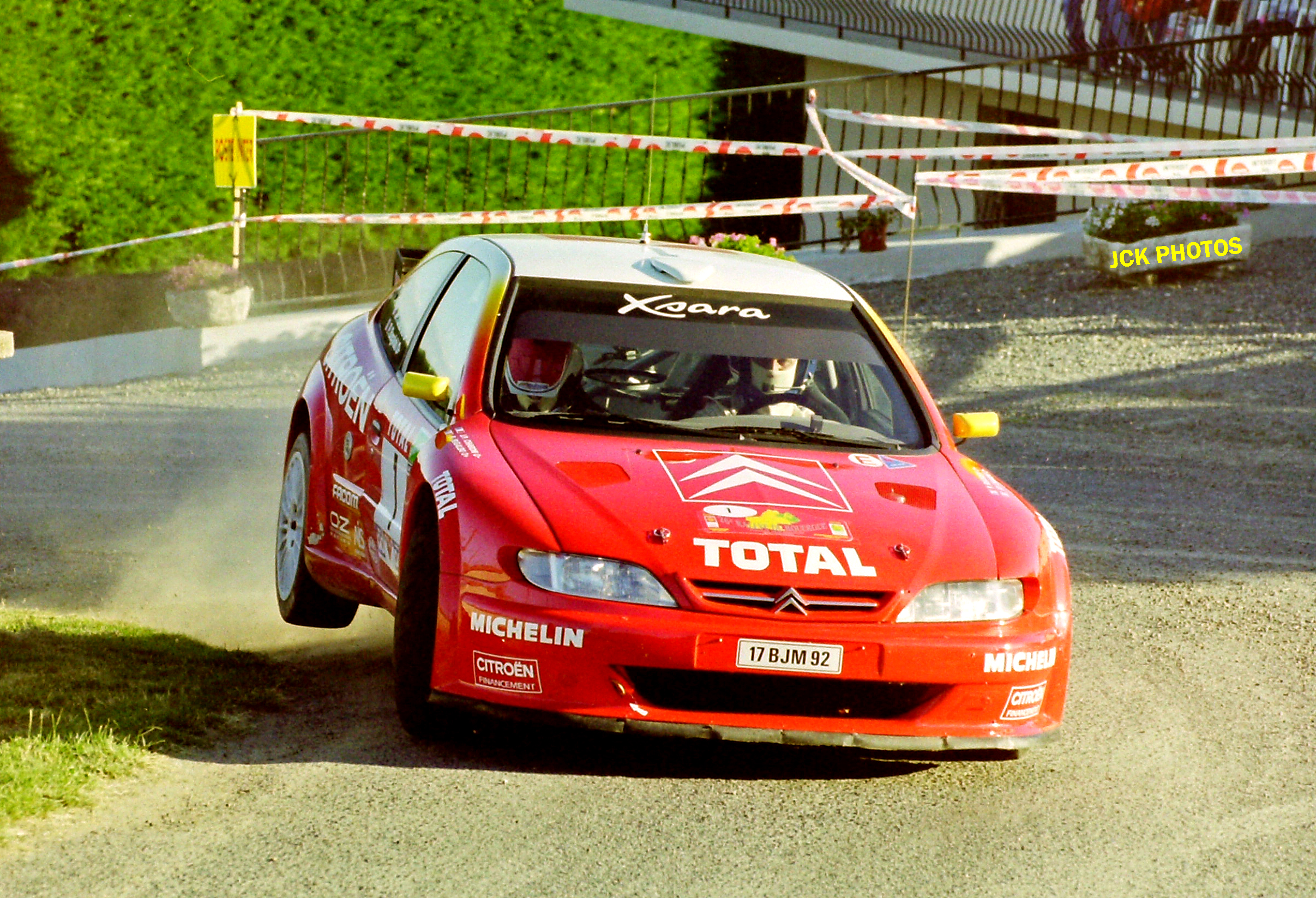
- Philippe Bugalski driving an Xsara Kit Car at the 1999 Rallye du Rouergue.
- Category: Formula 2 Kit Car
- Constructor: Citroën Racing
- Designer: Jean-Claude Vaucard
- Successor: Citroën Xsara WRC

Technical specifications
- Length: 4,167 mm (164.1 in)
- Width: 1,855 mm (73.0 in)
- Height: 1,391 mm (54.8 in)
- Wheelbase: 2,555 mm (100.6 in)
- Engine: 1,999 cubic centimetres (122.0 cu in) I4 XU Front engine FWD
- Power: 280 brake horsepower (210 kW); 255 newton-metres (188 lbf⋅ft)
- Weight: 960 kg (2,116.4 lb)
- Tyres: Michelin

Competition history (WRC)
- Notable entrants: (France) Citroën
- Notable drivers: (France) Philippe Bugalski (Spain) Jesús Puras
- Debut: (Spain) 1998 Rally Catalunya
- First win: (Spain) 1999 Rally Catalunya
- Last win: (France) 1999 Tour de Corse
- Last event: (Spain) 2000 Rally Catalunya
Races	Wins	Podiums	Titles
15	2	3	0
- Constructors' Championships: 0
- Drivers' Championships: 0

Citroën Xsara Kit Car is a rally car derived from the Citroën Xsara road car. The two wheel drive naturally aspirated car was built by Citroën Sport to FIA Kit car F2 regulations. It participated in the French Rally Championship, in which it raced from 1998 to 2001. The car took two World Rally Championship rally victories in 1999, which resulted in rule changes that made the car un-competitive against World Rally Car machinery. The car was succeeded by the Citroën Xsara WRC from 2002.

== Background ==
In March 1997, development works on the engine began, and in April – on the body structure. The first car was delivered for further optimization on July 12, 1997. The final version made its debut at the Lyon-Charbonnieres Rally in March 1998.

=== Championship of France and Spain ===
Already during the first start in the Lyon-Charbonnieres Rally, French driver Philippe Bugalski, driving a Xsara, won the general classification of the rally. Bugalski won 6 out of the 10 rallies of the 1998 French championship with the Xsara and eventually won the championship. The following season was even better, driving the Xsara Kit Car, the Frenchman won 9 out of 10 rallies and again won the overall standings.

The same was true in Spain, where Spanish driver Jesús Puras won the national championship three times in 1998–2000 driving the Xsara Kit Car. In 2001 the Xsara Kit Car triumphed again on the rally routes of France, with French driver Sébastien Loeb winning the French championship, taking victory in 6 out of 10 rallies.

=== European Championship ===
The first victory of the Xsara Kit Car in the rallies included in the European Championship was achieved by Philippe Bugalski during the Rally d'Antibes in 1998, this season he won in the last rally of the season – Rallye du Var. Ultimately, it allowed for the third place in the general classification of the championship.

Another victory came at the beginning of the 1999 season in the Rally El Corte Inglés, where Jesús Puras competed in Xsara. In turn, in the d'Antibes and du Var rallies this season, Philippe Bugalski won for the second time in a row.

Belgian driver Bruno Thiry was the most successful driver of the Xsara Kit Car in the 2000 season. In the El Corte Inglés Rally, Xsara took the first two places, Jesús Puras won, and Thiry was second. He also won the Albena Rally and was in third place in three other rallies. Ultimately, this allowed them to win the European runner-up in the 2000 season. Xsara also triumphed this season thanks to Sébastien Loeb, who won the Rally du Var, and also in the 2001 season, where Loeb won the Rally d'Antibes.

=== World Cup ===
Due to the characteristics of the car, competitions in the World Rally Championship were limited only to rallies taking place on asphalt surfaces, where the front-wheel Xsara Kit Car was competitive with the four-drive WRC cars.

Xsara's debut in the World Rally Championship was at Rally Catalunya in April 1998. Unfortunately, Jesús Puras did not finish the rally due to an engine failure. However, Philippe Bugalski took a good fifth place. The following rallies in the season were not happy for Citroën drivers who did not record good results.

In 1999, the Xsara Kit Car was the most successful. It started with a sensational victory for Philippe Bugalski in the Rally Catalunya, which dethroned rivals such as Richard Burns in a Subaru Impreza WRC, Didier Auriol in a Toyota Corolla WRC, and Tommi Mäkinen in a Mitsubishi Lancer Evo VI. The biggest success of the Kit Car was taking the first two places during the Tour de Corse. Once again, Philippe Bugalski was first, followed by Jesús Puras, ahead of Carlos Sainz in the Toyota Corolla WRC and Colin McRae in the Ford Focus WRC.

Unfortunately, the above victories turned out to be the beginning of the end of the Xsara Kit Car's splendor. For the 2000 season, the FIA Council planned changes in the F2 class, in which the Xsaras competed, by increasing the minimum weight of the cars. Thus, they were deprived of their greatest advantage – low weight. This made the car un-competitive against World Rally Car machinery. The car was succeeded by the Citroën Xsara WRC from 2002.

== WRC victories ==
#	Event	Season	Driver	Co-driver
1	(Spain) 1999 Rally Catalunya	1999	(France) Philippe Bugalski	(France) Jean-Paul Chiaroni
2	(France) 1999 Tour de Corse	1999	(France) Philippe Bugalski	(France) Jean-Paul Chiaroni

== WRC results ==
Year	Driver	1	2	3	4	5	6	7	8	9	10	11	12	13	14	WMC	Points
1998		MON	SWE	KEN	POR	ESP	FRA	ARG	GRE	NZL	FIN	ITA	AUS	GBR		–	–
1998	(France) Philippe Bugalski					5	Ret					Ret				–	–
1998	(Spain) Jesús Puras					Ret						Ret				–	–
1998	(France) Patrick Magaud						10					11				–	–
1998	(France) Fabien Doenlen						7									–	–
1999		MON	SWE	KEN	POR	ESP	FRA	ARG	GRE	NZL	FIN	CHN	ITA	AUS	GBR	–	–
1999	(France) Philippe Bugalski					1	1						Ret			–	–
1999	(Spain) Jesús Puras	Ret				Ret	2									–	–
2000		MON	SWE	KEN	POR	ESP	ARG	GRE	NZL	FIN	CYP	FRA	ITA	AUS	GBR	–	–
2000	(Spain) Jesús Puras					Ret										–	–
