= Philippe Bugalski =

French rally driver (1963–2012)

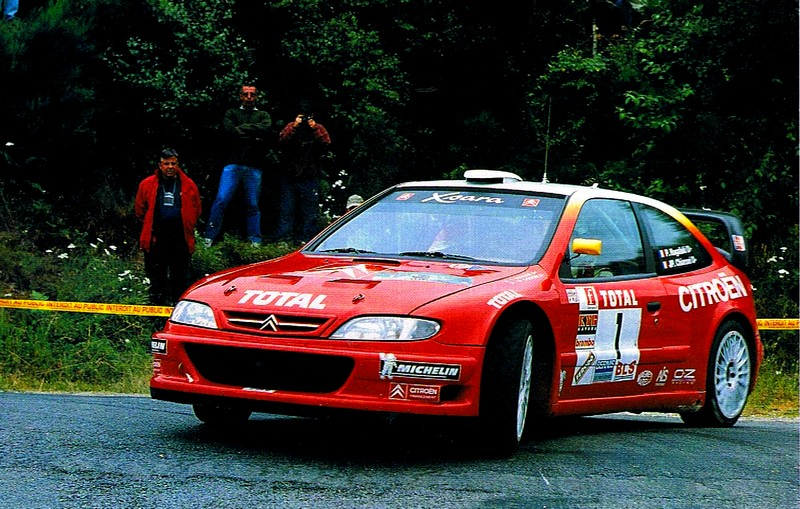

Personal information
- Nationality: (France) French
- Full name: Philippe Bernard Bugalski
- Born: 12 June 1963; Cusset, France
- Died: 10 August 2012 (aged 49); Le Vaudoué, France

World Rally Championship record
- Years active: 1984–2004
- Co-driver: (France) Dominique Perruchon (France) Jean-Marc Andrié (France) Denis Giraudet (France) Thierry Renaud (France) Jean-Paul Chiaroni
- Teams: Citroën, Renault
- Rallies: 36
- Rally wins: 2
- Podiums: 4
- Stage wins: 27
- Total points: 56
- First rally: 1984 Monte Carlo Rally
- First win: 1999 Rallye Catalunya
- Last win: 1999 Tour de Corse
- Last rally: 2003 Rallye Catalunya

Philippe Bernard Bugalski (12 June 1963 – 10 August 2012) was a French rally driver.

Bugalski became a works Renault driver in the French Rally Championship in 1994. In 1998, he joined the works Citroën team, with whom he won the French national title three years in a row, from 1998 to 2000.

By the mid-1990s, Bugalski had become a regular choice as tarmac specialist for Citroën, along with teammate Jesús Puras. However, as the Citroën Total World Rally Team entered the World Rally Championship full-time, employing such drivers as Sébastien Loeb, he was frequently entered as Citroën's 3rd driver for tarmac rallies. His top performances were on home soil on the Tour de Corse, but he also showed potential in the Rallye Sanremo, Monte Carlo Rally, and Rallye Catalunya.

In 1999, Bugalski won two races overall with formula 2 cars.

After his breakthrough, Bugalski struggled to secure a firm place in Citroën's WRC team but was always a solid reserve driver and was only really used as a tarmac specialist. By 2003, he had stopped rallying professionally.

Bugalski died on 10 August 2012, aged 49, from injuries sustained when he fell out of a tree at his home in Seine-et-Marne.

== WRC victories ==
#	Event	Season	Co-driver	Car
1	(Spain) 35º Rallye Catalunya-Costa Brava	1999	Jean-Paul Chiaroni	Citroën Xsara Kit Car
2	43ème Tour de Corse – Rallye de France	1999	Jean-Paul Chiaroni	Citroën Xsara Kit Car

== Complete WRC results ==
Year	Entrant	Car	1	2	3	4	5	6	7	8	9	10	11	12	13	14	WDC	Pts
1984	Philippe Bugalski	Volkswagen Golf GTi	MON; Ret	SWE	POR	KEN	FRA	GRE	NZL	ARG	FIN	ITA	CIV	GBR			NC	0
1988	Renault Chartres	Renault 21 Turbo	MON	SWE	POR	KEN	FRA; Ret	GRE	USA	NZL	ARG	FIN	CIV	ITA	GBR		NC	0
1989	Philippe Bugalski	Renault 21 Turbo	SWE	MON; Ret	POR	KEN	FRA	GRE	NZL	ARG	FIN	AUS	ITA	CIV	GBR		NC	0
1991	Société Diac	Renault Clio 16S	MON	SWE	POR	KEN	FRA; 8	GRE	NZL	ARG	FIN	AUS	ITA	CIV	ESP	GBR	50th	3
1992	Jolly Club	Lancia Delta HF Integrale Evoluzione	MON; 5	SWE	POR	KEN											13th	22
1992	Lancia Martini	Lancia Delta HF Integrale Evoluzione					FRA; 3	GRE	NZL	ARG	FIN; 9	AUS	ITA	CIV	ESP	GBR	13th	22
1994	Société Diac	Renault Clio Williams	MON	POR	KEN	FRA; Ret	GRE	ARG	NZL	FIN	ITA	GBR					NC	0
1995	Société Diac	Renault Clio Williams Maxi	MON; Ret	SWE	POR	FRA; 9	NZL	AUS	ESP	GBR							27th	2
1997	Société Diac	Renault Maxi Mégane	MON	SWE	KEN	POR	ESP	FRA; 6	ARG	GRE	NZL	FIN	IDN	ITA	AUS	GBR	33rd	1
1998	Automobiles Citroën	Citroën Xsara Kit Car	MON	SWE	KEN	POR	ESP; 5	FRA; Ret	ARG	GRE	NZL	FIN	ITA; Ret	AUS	GBR		18th	2
1999	Automobiles Citroën	Citroën Saxo Kit Car	MON; Ret	SWE	KEN	POR											7th	20
1999	Automobiles Citroën	Citroën Xsara Kit Car					ESP; 1	FRA; 1	ARG	GRE	NZL	FIN	CHN	ITA; Ret	AUS	GBR	7th	20
2000	Automobiles Citroën	Citroën Saxo Kit Car	MON	SWE	KEN	POR	ESP	ARG	GRE; 16	NZL	FIN	CYP	FRA; 16	ITA; Ret	AUS	GBR	NC	0
2001	Automobiles Citroën	Citroën Saxo Kit Car	MON; 14	SWE	POR; Ret												22nd	1
2001	Automobiles Citroën	Citroën Xsara WRC				ESP; 8	ARG	CYP	GRE; 6	KEN	FIN	NZL	ITA; Ret	FRA; Ret	AUS		22nd	1
2002	Automobiles Citroën	Citroën Xsara WRC	MON; Ret	SWE		ESP; 3	CYP	ARG	GRE	KEN	FIN	GER; Ret					11th	7
2002	Piedrafita Sport	Citroën Xsara WRC			FRA; 4								ITA; Ret	NZL	AUS	GBR	11th	7
2003	Citroën Total WRT	Citroën Xsara WRC	MON	SWE	TUR	NZL	ARG	GRE	CYP	GER; Ret	FIN	AUS	ITA; 8	FRA; 9	ESP; 10	GBR	21st	1
