= Rally de Catalunya =

Motorsport competition in Catalonia, Spain

- Genre: Rallying
- Frequency: Annual
- Location: Catalonia
- Country: Spain
- Inaugurated: 1957

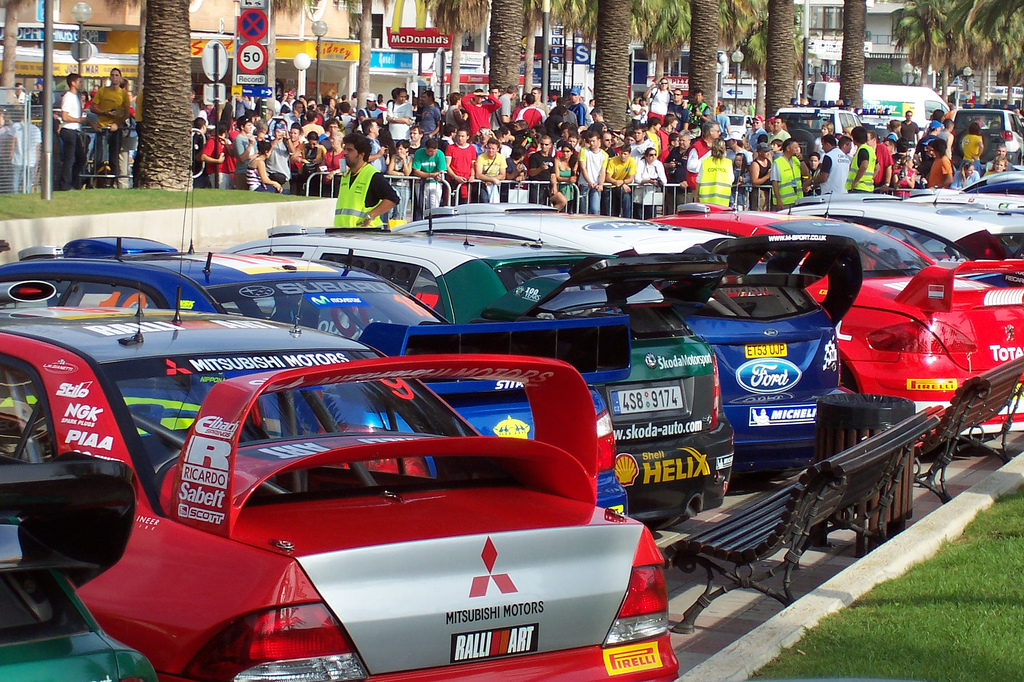
WRC cars at the 2005 event.

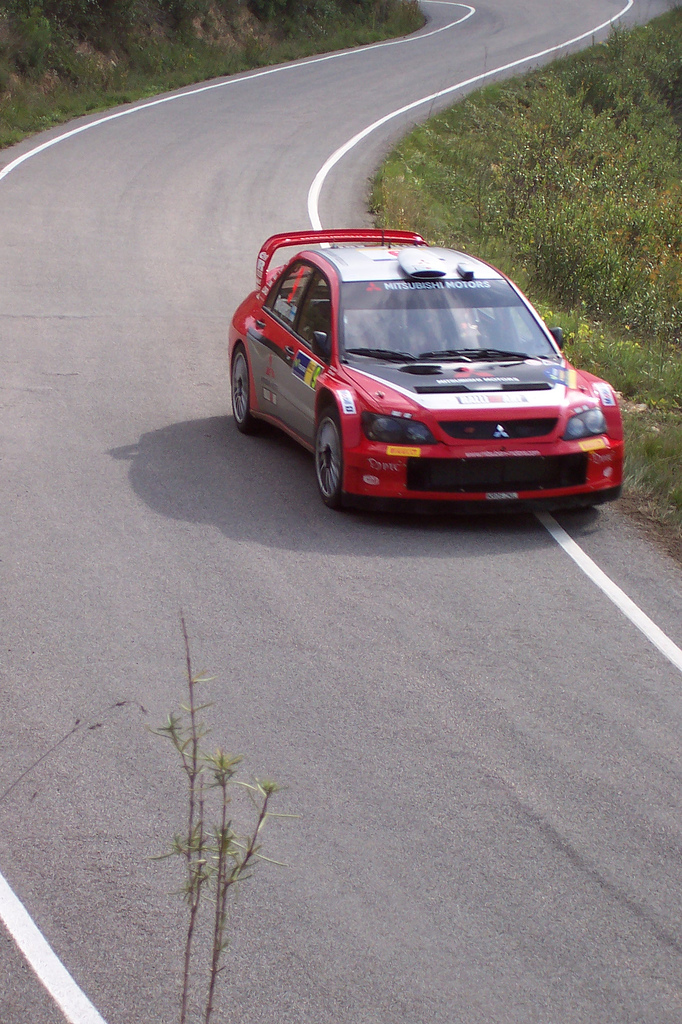
Harri Rovanperä driving on SS9 of the 2005 rally.

The Rally Catalunya (formerly: Rallye Catalunya) is a rally competition held in the Catalonia region of Spain, on the World Rally Championship schedule. Now held on the wide, smooth and sweeping asphalt roads around the town of Salou, Costa Daurada, it was previously held around the region of Costa Brava. In the 2012 season, the rally was held 8–11 November.

Rally de Catalunya was first held in 1957; in 1988 it was merged with the Rally Costa Brava and renamed as Rally Catalunya – Costa Brava.

== Winners since 1988 ==
Year	Rally	Winner	Car
1988	24º Rallye Catalunya-Costa Brava	(France) Bruno Saby (France) Jean-François Fauchille	Lancia Delta HF 4WD; Martini Lancia
1989	25º Rallye Catalunya-Costa Brava	(France) Yves Loubet (France) Jean-Marc Andrié	Lancia Delta Integrale; HF Grifone
1990	26º Rallye Catalunya-Costa Brava	(Italy) Dario Cerrato (Italy) Giuseppe Cerri	Lancia Delta Integrale 16v Jolly Club
1991	27º Rallye Catalunya-Costa Brava (Rallye de España)	(Germany) Armin Schwarz (Sweden) Arne Hertz	Toyota Celica GT-Four ST165; Toyota Team Europe
1992	28º Rallye Catalunya-Costa Brava (Rallye de España)	(Spain) Carlos Sainz (Spain) Luis Moya	Toyota Celica Turbo 4WD; Toyota Team Europe
1993	29º Rallye Catalunya-Costa Brava (Rallye de España)	(France) François Delecour (France) Daniel Grataloup	Ford Escort RS Cosworth; Ford Motor Co
1994 ^{†}	30º Rallye Catalunya-Costa Brava (Rallye de España)	(Italy) Enrico Bertone (Italy) Massimo Chiapponi	Toyota Celica Turbo 4WD; HF Grifone
1995	31º Rallye Catalunya-Costa Brava (Rallye de España)	(Spain) Carlos Sainz (Spain) Luís Moya	Subaru Impreza 555; 555 Subaru World Rally Team
1996	32º Rallye Catalunya-Costa Brava (Rallye de España)	(United Kingdom) Colin McRae (United Kingdom) Derek Ringer	Subaru Impreza 555; 555 Subaru World Rally Team
1997	33º Rallye Catalunya-Costa Brava (Rallye de España)	(Finland) Tommi Mäkinen (Finland) Seppo Harjanne	Mitsubishi Lancer Evo IV; Team Mitsubishi Ralliart
1998	34º Rallye Catalunya-Costa Brava (Rallye de España)	(France) Didier Auriol (France) Denis Giraudet	Toyota Corolla WRC; Toyota Castrol Team
1999	35º Rallye Catalunya-Costa Brava (Rallye de España)	(France) Philippe Bugalski (France) Jean-Paul Chiaroni	Citroën Xsara Kit Car; Automobiles Citroën
2000	36º Rallye Catalunya-Costa Brava (Rallye de España)	(United Kingdom) Colin McRae (United Kingdom) Nicky Grist	Ford Focus RS WRC 00; Ford Motor Co
2001	37º Rallye Catalunya-Costa Brava (Rallye de España)	(France) Didier Auriol (France) Denis Giraudet	Peugeot 206 WRC; Peugeot Total
2002	38º Rallye Catalunya-Costa Brava (Rallye de España)	(France) Gilles Panizzi (France) Herve Panizzi	Peugeot 206 WRC; Peugeot Total
2003	39º Rallye Catalunya-Costa Brava (Rallye de España)	(France) Gilles Panizzi (France) Hervé Panizzi	Peugeot 206 WRC; Marlboro Peugeot Total
2004	40º Rallye Catalunya-Costa Brava (Rallye de España)	(Estonia) Markko Märtin (United Kingdom) Michael Park	Ford Focus RS WRC 04; Ford Motor Co
2005	41º Rally RACC Catalunya – Costa Daurada (Rallye de España)	(France) Sébastien Loeb (Monaco) Daniel Elena	Citroën Xsara WRC; Citroën Total
2006	42º Rally RACC Catalunya – Costa Daurada (Rallye de España)	(France) Sébastien Loeb (Monaco) Daniel Elena	Citroën Xsara WRC; Kronos Total Citroën
2007	43º Rally RACC Catalunya – Costa Daurada (Rallye de España)	(France) Sébastien Loeb (Monaco) Daniel Elena	Citroën C4 WRC; Citroën Total
2008	44º Rally RACC Catalunya – Costa Daurada (Rallye de España)	(France) Sébastien Loeb (Monaco) Daniel Elena	Citroën C4 WRC; Citroën Total
2009	45º Rally RACC Catalunya – Costa Daurada (Rallye de España)	(France) Sébastien Loeb (Monaco) Daniel Elena	Citroën C4 WRC; Citroën Total
2010	46º Rally RACC Catalunya – Costa Daurada (Rallye de España)	(France) Sébastien Loeb (Monaco) Daniel Elena	Citroën C4 WRC; Citroën Total
2011	47º Rally RACC Catalunya – Costa Daurada (Rallye de España)	(France) Sébastien Loeb (Monaco) Daniel Elena	Citroën DS3 WRC; Citroën Total
2012	48º Rally RACC Catalunya – Costa Daurada (Rallye de España)	(France) Sébastien Loeb (Monaco) Daniel Elena	Citroën DS3 WRC; Citroën Total
2013	49º Rally RACC Catalunya – Costa Daurada (Rallye de España)	(France) Sébastien Ogier (France) Julien Ingrassia	Volkswagen Polo R WRC; Volkswagen Motorsport
2014	50º Rally RACC Catalunya – Costa Daurada (Rallye de España)	(France) Sébastien Ogier (France) Julien Ingrassia	Volkswagen Polo R WRC; Volkswagen Motorsport
2015	51º Rally RACC Catalunya – Costa Daurada (Rallye de España)	(Norway) Andreas Mikkelsen (Norway) Ola Fløene	Volkswagen Polo R WRC; Volkswagen Motorsport II
2016	52º Rally RACC Catalunya – Costa Daurada (Rallye de España)	(France) Sébastien Ogier (France) Julien Ingrassia	Volkswagen Polo R WRC; Volkswagen Motorsport
2017	53º Rally RACC Catalunya – Costa Daurada (Rallye de España)	(United Kingdom) Kris Meeke (Republic of Ireland) Paul Nagle	Citroën C3 WRC; Citroën Total World Rally Team
2018	54º Rally RACC Catalunya – Costa Daurada (Rallye de España)	(France) Sébastien Loeb (Monaco) Daniel Elena	Citroën C3 WRC; Citroën Total World Rally Team
2019	55º Rally RACC Catalunya – Costa Daurada (Rallye de España)	(Belgium) Thierry Neuville (Belgium) Nicolas Gilsoul	Hyundai i20 Coupe WRC; Hyundai Shell Mobis World Rally Team
2020	Event cancelled due to COVID-19 pandemic		
2021	56º Rally RACC Catalunya – Costa Daurada (Rallye de España)	(Belgium) Thierry Neuville (Belgium) Martijn Wydaeghe	Hyundai i20 Coupe WRC; Hyundai Shell Mobis World Rally Team
2022	57º Rally RACC Catalunya – Costa Daurada (Rallye de España)	(France) Sébastien Ogier (France) Benjamin Veillas	Toyota GR Yaris Rally1; Toyota Gazoo Racing World Rally Team

† — The 1994 rally only counted for the 2-Litre World Cup.

=== Multiple winners ===
Wins	Driver	Years won
9	(France) Sébastien Loeb	2005–2012, 2018
4	(France) Sébastien Ogier	2013, 2014, 2016, 2022
2	(Spain) Carlos Sainz	1992, 1995
2	(United Kingdom) Colin McRae	1996, 2000
2	(France) Didier Auriol	1998, 2001
2	(France) Gilles Panizzi	2002, 2003
2	(Belgium) Thierry Neuville	2019, 2021

Wins	Manufacturers
11	(France) Citroën
4	(Japan) Toyota
4	(Germany) Volkswagen
3	(Italy) Lancia
3	(United States) Ford
3	(France) Peugeot
2	(Japan) Subaru
2	(South Korea) Hyundai
