= 1999 Safari Rally =

Rallying motorsport event

1999 Safari Rally 47th 555 Safari Rally
Round 3 of 14 in the 1999 World Rally Championship
← Previous event	Next event →
- Host country: Kenya
- Rally base: Nairobi
- Dates run: 25 – 28 February 1999
- Stages: 13 (1,009.91 km; 627.53 miles)
- Stage surface: Gravel
- Transport distance: 1,640.33 km (1,019.25 miles)
- Overall distance: 2,650.24 km (1,646.78 miles)

Statistics
- Crews registered: 45
- Crews: 45 at start, 24 at finish

Overall results
- Overall winner: (United Kingdom) Colin McRae (United Kingdom) Nicky Grist (United Kingdom) Ford Motor Co Ltd; 8:41:39

The 1999 Safari Rally was a motor racing event for rally cars that was held over four days between 25 and 28 February 1999. It marked the 47th running of the Safari Rally, and was the third round of the 1999 World Rally Championship season. The 1999 event was based in the city of Nairobi in Kenya and was contested over thirteen special stages, covering a total competitive distance of 1,009.91km (627.53 miles).

Tommi Makinen was the defending rally winner, as was Team Mitsubishi Ralliart. Having won both rallies of the season so far, Makinen lead the championship with twenty points; thirteen more than closest rival Juha Kankkunen.

Colin McRae, along with co-driver Nicky Grist won the rally, their first win of the season, and first win since the 1998 Acropolis Rally, giving them their first points of the season.

== Background ==
=== Entry list ===
The following crews were set to enter the rally. The event was open to crews competing in the World Rally Championship, as well as privateer entries that were not registered to score points in the manufacturer's championship. Ten were entered under Group A regulations to compete in the World Rally Championship's Manufacturers' Championship.

Group A entries competing in the World Rally Championship
No.	Driver	Co-Driver	Entrant	Car	Tyre
1	(Finland) Tommi Makinen	(Finland) Risto Mannisenmaki	(Japan) Marlboro Mitsubishi Ralliart	Mitsubishi Lancer Evo VI	M
2	(Belgium) Freddy Loix	(Belgium) Sven Smeets	(Japan) Marlboro Mitsubishi Ralliart	Mitsubishi Lancer Evo VI	M
3	(Spain) Carlos Sainz Sr.	(Spain) Luis Moya	(Japan) Toyota Castrol Team	Toyota Corolla WRC	M
4	(France) Didier Auriol	(France) Denis Giraudet	(Japan) Toyota Castrol Team	Toyota Corolla WRC	M
5	(United Kingdom) Richard Burns	(United Kingdom) Robert Reid	(Japan) Subaru World Rally Team	Subaru Impreza S5 WRC 99	P
6	(Finland) Juha Kankkunen	(Finland) Juha Repo	(Japan) Subaru World Rally Team	Impreza WRC 2006	P
7	(United Kingdom) Colin McRae	(United Kingdom) Nicky Grist	(United Kingdom) Ford Motor Co Ltd	Ford Focus WRC 99	M
8	(Norway) Petter Solberg	(United Kingdom) Fred Gallagher	(United Kingdom) Ford Motor Co Ltd	Ford Focus WRC 99	M
9	(Finland) Harri Rovanpera	(Finland) Risto Pietilainen	(Spain) SEAT Sport	SEAT Cordoba WRC	P
10	(Italy) Piero Liatti	(Italy) Carlo Cassina	(Spain) SEAT Sport	SEAT Cordoba WRC	P

=== Itinerary ===
All dates and times are EAT (UTC+3).

Date	No.	Time span	Stage name	Distance
25 February	SS1	15:00	Cheetah Anza - Isha 1	2.42 km
25 February		15:05	Service A, Jamhuri Park	—N/a
26 February		9:55	Service B, Plains Park	—N/a
26 February	SS2	10:25	Isinya - Orien 1	112.40 km
26 February		11:25	Service C, Plains Park	—N/a
26 February	SS3	12:11	Olooloitikosh - Kajiado 1	49.06 km
26 February		12:38	Service D, Plains Park	—N/a
26 February	SS4	14:07	Hunters Lookout - Timbuctoo	72.56 km
26 February		14:53	Service E, Plains Park	—N/a
26 February	SS5	16:00	Lenkili - Il Bisel 1	113.41 km
26 February		17:15	Service F, Plains Park	—N/a
27 February		6:40	Service G, Equator Park	—N/a
27 February	SS6	7:33	Elmenteita - Olenguruone	89.13 km
27 February		9:10	Service H, Equator Park	—N/a
27 February	SS7	10:35	Nyaru - Eldama Ravine	87.59 km
27 February		12:10	Service I, Equator Park	—N/a
27 February	SS8	13:42	Morendat - Mbaruk	81.40 km
27 February		14:50	Service J, Equator Park	—N/a
27 February	SS9	15:59	Marigat - Gari Ya Moshi	124.65 km
27 February		17:00	Service K, Equator Park	—N/a
28 February		6:37	Service L, Plains Park	—N/a
28 February	SS10	7:33	Lenkili - Il Bisel 2	113.41 km
28 February		8:46	Service M, Plains Park	—N/a
28 February	SS11	9:26	Isinya - Orien 2	112.40 km
28 February		10:28	Service N, Plains Park	—N/a
28 February	SS12	11:14	Olooloitikosh - Kajiado 2	49.06 km
28 February		11:41	Service I, Plains Park	—N/a
28 February	SS13	14:00	Cheetah Anza - Isha 2	2.42 km

== Report ==
=== Overall ===
==== Classification ====
Position	No.	Driver	Co-driver	Entrant	Car	Time	Difference	Points
1	7	(United Kingdom) Colin McRae	(United Kingdom) Nicky Grist	(United Kingdom) Ford Motor Co Ltd	Ford Focus WRC 99	8:41:39	0.0	10
2	4	(France) Didier Auriol	(France) Denis Giraudet	(Japan) Toyota Castrol Team	Toyota Corolla WRC	8:56:05	+14:26	6
3	3	(Spain) Carlos Sainz Sr.	(Spain) Luis Moya	(Japan) Toyota Castrol Team	Toyota Corolla WRC	8:59:46	+18:07	4
4	12	(Kenya) Ian Duncan	(Kenya) David Williamson	Toyota Kenya	Toyota Corolla WRC	9:05:35	+23:56	3
5	8	(Norway) Petter Solberg	(United Kingdom) Fred Gallagher	(United Kingdom) Ford Motor Co Ltd	Ford Focus WRC 99	9:26:28	+44:49	2
6	9	(Finland) Harri Rovanpera	(Finland) Risto Pietilainen	(Spain) SEAT Sport	SEAT Cordoba WRC	9:40:08	+58:29	1
7	16	(France) Frederic Dor	(United Kingdom) Kevin Gormley	(France) F. Dor Rally Team	Subaru Impreza S5 WRC 97	9:41:38	+59:59	0
8	14	(Oman) Hamed Al-Wahaibi	(New Zealand) Tony Sircombe	(Japan) Mitsubishi Ralliart	Mitsubishi Carisma GT Evo V	10:05:09	+1:23:30	0
9	15	(Spain) Asensio Luis Clement	(Spain) Alex Romani	(Spain) Valencia Terra y Mar	Mitsubishi Lancer Evo III	10:08:24	+1:26:45	0
10	20	(Japan) Hideaki Miyoshi	(Japan) Eido Osawa	(Japan) Hideaki Miyoshi	Subaru Impreza WRX	10:42:00	+2:00:21	0
11	18	(Kenya) Jonathan Toroitich	(Kenya) Mahesh Saleh	(Kenya) Jonathan Toroitich	Toyota Celica GT-Four	11:21:28	+2:39:49	0
12	17	(Austria) Manfred Stohl	(Austria) Peter Muller	(Austria) Manfred Stohl	Mitsubishi Lancer Evo III	11:41:42	+3:00:03	0
13	23	(Kenya) Rob Hellier	(United Kingdom) Des Page-Morris	(Kenya) Rob Hellier	Mitsubishi Lancer Evo	11:48:44	+3:07:05	0
14	26	(United Kingdom) John Lloyd	(Kenya) David Horsey	(United Kingdom) John Lloyd	Subaru Impreza WRX	11:51:31	+3:09:52	0
15	34	(United Kingdom) Shahnawaz Murji	(Kenya) Mohammed Verjee	(United Kingdom) Shahnawaz Murji	Subaru Impreza	12:22:27	+3:40:48	0
16	33	(Kenya) Hardeep Reshi	(Kenya) Kamaljeet Ubhi	(Kenya) Hardeep Reshi	Subaru Impreza WRX	12:32:32	+3:50:53	0
17	22	(United Kingdom) Mark Tilbury	(Kenya) Bill Kirk	(United Kingdom) Mark Tilbury	Nissan Pulsar GTi-R	13:19:32	+4:37:53	0
18	24	(Kenya) Phineas Kimathi	(Kenya) Abdul Sidi	(Kenya) Phineas Kimathi	Hyundai Coupe	13:26:16	+4:37:53	0
19	28	(Kenya) Jimmy Wahome	(Kenya) Tom Muriuki	(Kenya) Jimmy Wahome	Subaru Impreza WRX	13:44:26	+5:02:47	0
20	39	(Kenya) Lee Rose	(Kenya) Piers Daykin	(Kenya) Lee Rose	Subaru Impreza WRX	13:51:22	+5:09:43	0
21	39	(Kenya) Paramjit Sehmi	(Kenya) Kashif Sheikh	(Kenya) Paramjit Sehmi	Subaru Impreza WRX	14:18:53	+5:37:14	0
22	21	(Kenya) Jamil Khan	(Kenya) Surinder Thatthi	(Kenya) Jamil Khan	Subaru Impreza WRX	14:23:42	+5:42:03	0
23	41	(Italy) Stefano Rocca	(Kenya) Saleem Haji	(Italy) Stefano Rocca	Subaru Impreza WRX	14:45:55	+6:04:16	0
24	43	(Kenya) Shahid Essajee	(Kenya) Shammi Singh	(Kenya) Shahid Essajee	Mitsubishi Lancer Evo	15:36:27	+6:54:48	0
Retired SS13	1	(Finland) Tommi Makinen	(Finland) Risto Mannisenmaki	(Japan) Marlboro Mitsubishi Ralliart	Mitsubishi Lancer Evo VI	Excluded		0
Retired SS13	30	(Kenya) John Ngunjiri	(Kenya) Thuita Karanja	(Kenya) John Ngunjiri	Mitsubishi Lancer Evo	Retired		0
Retired SS11	10	(Italy) Piero Liatti	(Italy) Carlo Cassina	(Spain) SEAT Sport	SEAT Cordoba WRC	Engine		0
Retired SS9	35	(Kenya) Michelle van Tongeren	(Kenya) Safina Hussein	(Kenya) Michelle van Tongeren	Subaru Impreza WRX	Excluded		0
Retired SS9	37	(Kenya) Don Smith	(Kenya) Simon Bates	(Kenya) Don Smith	Ford Escort RS Cosworth	Retired		0
Retired SS7	5	(United Kingdom) Richard Burns	(United Kingdom) Robert Reid	(Japan) Subaru World Rally Team	Subaru Impreza S5 WRC 99	Suspension		0
Retired SS7	25	(Kenya) Rory Green	(Kenya) Orson Taylor	(Kenya) Rory Green	Subaru Impreza WRX	Retired		0
Retired SS7	31	(United Kingdom) Alastair Cavenagh	(Kenya) Crispin Sassoon	(United Kingdom) Alastair Cavenagh	Subaru Impreza WRX	Suspension		0
Retired SS7	36	(Kenya) Azar Anwar	(Kenya) Raffiq Cassam	(Kenya) Azar Anwar	Hyundai Elantra	Driveshaft		0
Retired SS6	29	(Kenya) Gregory Kibiti	(Kenya) George Mwangi	(Kenya) Gregory Kibiti	Hyundai Coupe	Suspension		0
Retired SS6	45	(Kenya) Tinu Khan	(Kenya) Amaar Slatch	(Kenya) Tinu Khan	Subaru Legacy RS	Accident		0
Retired SS5	19	(Uganda) Emmanuel Katto	(Kenya) Peter Stone	(Uganda) Emmanuel Katto	Subaru Impreza S5 WRC 98	Engine		0
Retired SS5	50	(Kenya) Brendan Fernandes	(Kenya) Tony Kimondo	(Kenya) Brendan Fernandes	Hyundai Elantra	Retired		0
Retired SS4	38	(Kenya) Peter Karwigi	(Kenya) Peter Macharia	(Kenya) Peter Karwigi	Subaru Legacy RS	Retired		0
Retired SS3	2	(Belgium) Freddy Loix	(Belgium) Sven Smeets	(Japan) Marlboro Mitsubishi Ralliart	Mitsubishi Lancer Evo VI	Accident		0
Retired SS3	6	(Finland) Juha Kankkunen	(Finland) Juha Repo	(Japan) Subaru World Rally Team	Impreza WRC 2006	Electrical		0
Retired SS3	40	(Kenya) Shabir Hussein	(Kenya) Diamond Lalani	(Kenya) Shabir Hussein	Subaru Legacy RS	Retired		0
Retired SS3	49	(Kenya) Alan Kuria	(Kenya) Baga Singh	(Kenya) Alan Kuria	Mazda 323	Retired		0
Retired SS2	11	(Belgium) Bruno Thiry	(Belgium) Stephane Prevot	(Japan) Subaru World Rally Team	Subaru Impreza S5 WRC 98	Electrical		0
Retired SS2	44	(Kenya) Ghalib Hajee	(Kenya) Sameer Nanji	(Kenya) Ghalib Hajee	Toyota Celica Turbo 4WD	Mechanical		0
Retired SS2	48	(Kenya) Asad Khan	(Kenya) Adil Khan	(Kenya) Asad Khan	Subaru Impreza WRX	Mechanical		0

==== Special Stages ====
All dates and times are EAT (UTC+3).

Day	Stage	Time	Name	Length (km)	Winner	Time	Rally leader
1 25 Feb	SS1	15:00	Cheetah Anza - Isha 1	2.42	(Finland) Juha Kankkunen	1:53	(Finland) Juha Kankkunen
2 26 Feb	SS2	10:25	Isinya - Orien 1	112.40	(United Kingdom) Richard Burns	48:25	(United Kingdom) Richard Burns
2 26 Feb	SS3	12:11	Olooloitikosh - Kajiado 1	49.06	(Spain) Carlos Sainz	22:38	(Spain) Carlos Sainz
2 26 Feb	SS4	14:07	Hunters Lookout - Timbuctoo	72.56	(United Kingdom) Richard Burns	36:11	(Spain) Carlos Sainz
2 26 Feb	SS5	16:00	Lenkili - Il Bisel 1	113.41	(Finland) Tommi Makinen	59:57	(United Kingdom) Richard Burns
3 27 Feb	SS6	7:33	Elmenteita - Olenguruone	89.13	(United Kingdom) Richard Burns	42:56	(United Kingdom) Richard Burns
3 27 Feb	SS7	10:35	Nyaru - Eldama Ravine	87.59	(Spain) Carlos Sainz	56:26	(United Kingdom) Colin McRae
3 27 Feb	SS8	13:42	Morendat - Mbaruk	81.40	(Finland) Tommi Makinen	41:03	(United Kingdom) Colin McRae
3 27 Feb	SS9	15:59	Marigat - Gari Ya Moshi	124.65	(Spain) Carlos Sainz	1:01:03	(United Kingdom) Colin McRae
4 28 Feb	SS10	7:33	Lenkili - Il Bisel 2	113.41	(France) Didier Auriol	1:00:22	(United Kingdom) Colin McRae
4 28 Feb	SS11	9:26	Isinya - Orien 2	112.40	(Kenya) Ian Duncan	50:22	(United Kingdom) Colin McRae
4 28 Feb	SS12	11:14	Olooloitikosh - Kajiado 2	49.06	(Finland) Tommi Makinen	22:59	(United Kingdom) Colin McRae
4 28 Feb	SS13	14:00	Cheetah Anza - Isha 2	2.42	(Finland) Tommi Makinen	1:56	(United Kingdom) Colin McRae

==== Championship Standings ====
Pos.	Drivers' Championship			Manufacturers' Championship		
Pos.	Move	Driver	Points	Move	Manufacturer	Points
1		(Finland) Tommi Makinen	20	1	(Japan) Toyota Castrol Team	23
2	1	(France) Didier Auriol	13	1	(Japan) Marlboro Mitsubishi Ralliart	20
3	1	(Spain) Carlos Sainz	10	2	(United Kingdom) Ford Motor Co Ltd	17
4	6	(United Kingdom) Colin McRae	10	2	(Japan) Subaru World Rally Team	10
5	3	(Finland) Juha Kankkunen	7	1	(Spain) SEAT Sport	7
