= 1999 Rallye de Portugal =

Rallying motorsport event

1999 Rally Portugal 33rd TAP Rallye de Portugal
Round 4 of 14 in the 1999 World Rally Championship
← Previous event	Next event →
- Host country: Portugal
- Rally base: Matosinhos
- Dates run: 21 – 24 March 1999
- Stages: 21 (358.85 km; 222.98 miles)
- Stage surface: Gravel
- Transport distance: 1,409.76 km (875.98 miles)
- Overall distance: 1,768.61 km (1,098.96 miles)

Statistics
- Crews registered: 117
- Crews: 117 at start, 56 at finish

Overall results
- Overall winner: (United Kingdom) Colin McRae (United Kingdom) Nicky Grist (United Kingdom) Ford Motor Co Ltd; 4:05:41.7

The 1999 Rallye de Portugal (formally the 33rd TAP Rallye de Portugal) was a motor racing event for rally cars that was held over four days between 21 and 24 March 1999. It marked the 33rd running of the Rally de Portugal, and was the fourth round of the 1999 World Rally Championship season. The 1999 event was based in the municipality of Matosinhos in Portugal and was contested over twenty one special stages, covering a total competitive distance of 358.85km (222.98 miles).

Colin McRae was the defending rally winner, as was Ford Motor Co Ltd. Having won two of three rallies of the season so far, Tommi Makinen lead the championship with twenty points; seven more than closest rival Didier Auriol.

McRae, along with co-driver Nicky Grist won the rally, their second win in a row, accelerating them to second in the championship.

== Background ==
=== Entry list ===
The following crews were set to enter the rally. The event was open to crews competing in the World Rally Championship, as well as privateer entries that were not registered to score points in the manufacturer's championship. Ten were entered under Group A regulations to compete in the World Rally Championship's Manufacturers' Championship.

Group A entries competing in the World Rally Championship
No.	Driver	Co-Driver	Entrant	Car	Tyre
1	(Finland) Tommi Makinen	(Finland) Risto Mannisenmaki	(Japan) Marlboro Mitsubishi Ralliart	Mitsubishi Lancer Evo VI	M
2	(Finland) Marcus Gronholm	(Finland) Timo Rautiainen	(Japan) Marlboro Mitsubishi Ralliart	Mitsubishi Lancer Evo VI	M
3	(Spain) Carlos Sainz	(Spain) Luis Moya	(Japan) Toyota Castrol Team	Toyota Corolla WRC	M
4	(France) Didier Auriol	(France) Denis Giraudet	(Japan) Toyota Castrol Team	Toyota Corolla WRC	M
5	(United Kingdom) Richard Burns	(United Kingdom) Robert Reid	(Japan) Subaru World Rally Team	Subaru Impreza S5 WRC 99	P
6	(Finland) Juha Kankkunen	(Finland) Juha Repo	(Japan) Subaru World Rally Team	Impreza WRC 2006	P
7	(United Kingdom) Colin McRae	(United Kingdom) Nicky Grist	(United Kingdom) Ford Motor Co Ltd	Ford Focus WRC 99	M
8	(Norway) Petter Solberg	(United Kingdom) Fred Gallagher	(United Kingdom) Ford Motor Co Ltd	Ford Focus WRC 99	M
9	(Finland) Harri Rovanpera	(Finland) Risto Pietilainen	(Spain) SEAT Sport	SEAT Cordoba WRC	P
10	(Italy) Piero Liatti	(Italy) Carlo Cassina	(Spain) SEAT Sport	SEAT Cordoba WRC	P
11	(Germany) Armin Schwarz	(Germany) Manfred Hiemer	(Czech Republic) Skoda Motorsport	Skoda Octavia WRC	P
12	(Czech Republic) Emil Triner	(Czech Republic) Milos Hulka	(Czech Republic) Skoda Motorsport	Skoda Octavia WRC	P

=== Itinerary ===
All dates and times are EAT (UTC+3).

Date	No.	Time span	Stage name	Distance
21 March	SS1	14:15	Baltar	3.20 km
21 March		14:23	Service A, Baltar	—N/a
22 March		7:13	Service B, Ponte de Lima	—N/a
22 March	SS2	7:46	Ponte de Lima Este	23.64 km
22 March	SS3	8:39	Ponte de Lima Oeste	25.84 km
22 March		10:04	Service C, Ponte de Lima	—N/a
22 March	SS4	12:01	Fafe - Lameirinha 1	15.20 km
22 March	SS5	12:25	Fafe - Luilhas 1	10.55 km
22 March		13:15	Service D, Vieira do Minho	—N/a
22 March	SS6	13:38	Cabreira 1	27.60 km
22 March		14:31	Service E, Cabeceiras de Basto	—N/a
22 March	SS7	15:20	Fafe - Lameirinha 2	15.20 km
22 March	SS8	15:44	Fafe - Luihas 2	10.55 km
22 March	SS9	16:47	Cabreira 2	27.60 km
22 March		17:30	Service F, Cabeceiras de Basto	—N/a
23 March		7:20	Service G, Oliveira de Azemeis	—N/a
23 March	SS10	7:59	Sever do Vouga	14.83 km
23 March	SS11	8:44	Ladario - Oliveira de Frades	11.26 km
23 March		10:02	Service H, Viseu	—N/a
23 March	SS12	11:19	Agueira	23.33 km
23 March	SS13	11:55	Mortazel	18.81 km
23 March	SS14	12:25	Mortagua	17.24 km
23 March		13:01	Service I, Mortagua	—N/a
23 March	SS15	14:02	Tabua	13.49 km
23 March	SS16	14:53	Arganil - Coja 1	20.96 km
23 March	SS17	15:34	Salgueiro - Gois 1	19.70 km
23 March		16:39	Service J, Arganil Sarzedo	—N/a
23 March	~~SS18~~	~~14:53~~	~~Arganil - Coja 1~~	~~20.96 km~~
23 March	~~SS19~~	~~15:34~~	~~Salgueiro - Gois 1~~	~~19.70 km~~
23 March		19:15	Service K, Arganil Sarzedo	—N/a
24 March		9:15	Service L, Felgueiras	—N/a
24 March	SS20	9:55	Viso - Celorico de Basto	11.84 km
24 March	SS21	10:48	Fridao	14.20 km
24 March	SS22	11:34	Aboboreira	17.96 km
24 March		12:10	Service M, Marco de Canaveses	—N/a
24 March	SS23	12:55	Lousada - Barrosas	15.85 km
24 March		13:30	Service N, Felgueiras	—N/a

== Report ==
=== Overall ===
==== Classification ====
Position	No.	Driver	Co-driver	Entrant	Car	Time	Difference	Points
1	7	(United Kingdom) Colin McRae	(United Kingdom) Nicky Grist	(United Kingdom) Ford Motor Co Ltd	Ford Focus WRC 99	4:05:41.7	0.0	10
2	3	(Spain) Carlos Sainz	(Spain) Luis Moya	(Japan) Toyota Castrol Team	Toyota Corolla WRC	4:05:54.0	+12.3	6
3	4	(France) Didier Auriol	(France) Denis Giraudet	(Japan) Toyota Castrol Team	Toyota Corolla WRC	4:05:58.2	+16.5	4
4	5	(United Kingdom) Richard Burns	(United Kingdom) Robert Reid	(Japan) Subaru World Rally Team	Subaru Impreza S5 WRC 99	4:06:37.1	+55.4	3
5	1	(Finland) Tommi Makinen	(Finland) Risto Mannisenmaki	(Japan) Marlboro Mitsubishi Ralliart	Mitsubishi Lancer Evo VI	4:06:46.1	+1:04.4	2
6	14	(Belgium) Bruno Thiry	(Belgium) Stephane Prevot	(Japan) Subaru World Rally Team	Subaru Impreza S5 WRC 99	4:13:11.4	+7:29.7	1
7	25	(Turkey) Volkan Isik	(Turkey) Erkan Bodur	Toyota Mobil Team Turkey	Toyota Corolla WRC	4:15:07.5	+9:25.8	0
8	27	(Germany) Matthias Kahle	(Germany) Dieter Schneppenheim	(Germany) Toyota Castrol Deutschland	Toyota Corolla WRC	4:15:15.9	+9:34.2	0
9	15	(Portugal) Rui Madeira	(Portugal) Nuno Rodrigues da Silva	(Portugal) Procar Rally Team	Subaru Impreza 555	10:08:24	+1:26:45	0
10	23	(Spain) Asensio Luis Clement	(Spain) Alex Romani	(Spain) Valencia Terra y Mar	Subaru Impreza 555	4:17:10.3	+211:28.6	0
11	8	(Norway) Petter Solberg	(United Kingdom) Fred Gallagher	(United Kingdom) Ford Motor Co Ltd	Ford Focus WRC 99	4:17:14.2	+11:32.5	0
12	39	(Portugal) Miguel Campos	(Portugal) Miguel Ramalho	(Portugal) Miguel Campos	Mitsubishi Carisma GT Evo V	4:22:11.0	+16:29.3	0
13	31	(United Kingdom) Alister McRae	(United Kingdom) David Senior	(South Korea) Hyundai Motorsport	Hyundai Coupe	4:22:49.7	+17:08.0	0
14	29	(Sweden) Kenneth Eriksson	(Sweden) Staffan Parmander	(South Korea) Hyundai Motorsport	Hyundai Coupe	4:23:31.0	+17:49.3	0
15	36	(Uruguay) Gustavo Trelles	(Argentina) Martin Christie	(Italy) Ralliart Italia	Mitsubishi Lancer Evo V	4:25:49.1	+20:07.4	0
16	28	(Portugal) Adruzilo Lopes	(Portugal) Luis Lisboa	(France) Peugeot Esso Silver Team SG	Peugeot 306 Maxi	4:26:04.0	+20:22.3	0
17	22	(Greece) Ioannis Papadimitriou	(Greece) Konstantinos Stefanis	(Greece) Ioannis Papadimitriou	Subaru Impreza 555	4:28:19.9	+22:38.2	0
18	50	(Portugal) Vitor Lopes	(Portugal) Jose Janela	(France) Automotiveis Citroen	Citroen Saxo	4:28:46.8	+23:05.1	0
19	32	(United Kingdom) Martin Rowe	(United Kingdom) Derek Ringer	(France) Renault Elf Dealer Rallying	Renault Megane Maxi	4:29:53.6	+24:11.9	0
20	21	(France) Frederic Dor	(France) Didier Breton	(France) F.Dor Rally Team	Subaru Impreza S5 WRC 98	4:30:09.1	+24:27.4	0
21	42	(Finland) Juha Kangas	(Finland) Mika Ovaskainen	(Finland) Juha Kangas	Subaru Impreza WRX	4:30:14.9	+24:33.2	0
22	47	(Peru) Ramon Ferreyros	(Peru) Gonzalo Saenz	(Peru) Ramon Ferreyros	Subaru Impreza WRX	4:32:10.1	+26:28.4	0
23	49	(Portugal) Miguel Cristovao	(Portugal) Joao Luz	(Portugal) Miguel Cristovao	Mitsubishi Lancer Evo V	4:34:36.4	+28:54.7	0
24	53	(Portugal) Horacio Franco	(Portugal) Tiago Mourao	(Portugal) Horacio Franco	Mitsubishi Lancer Evo IV	4:40:19.5	+34:37.8	0
25	56	(Portugal) Americo Antunes	(Portugal) Paulo Moura	(Portugal) Americo Antunes	Mitsubishi Lancer Evo IV	4:40:37.7	+34:56.0	0
26	51	(Portugal) Ferreira da Silva	(Portugal) Jose Pedro Silva	(Portugal) Ferreira da Silva	Ford Escort RS Cosworth	4:42:04.9	+36:23.2	0
27	88	(Belgium) Larry Cols	(Belgium) Pascal Lopes	(Belgium) Larry Cols	Mitsubishi Carisma GT Evo IV	4:45:19.7	+39:38.0	0
28	62	(Portugal) Pedro Cunha e Carmo	(Portugal) Duarte Pedro e Carmo	(Portugal) Pedro Cunha e Carmo	Subaru Impreza WRX	4:46:47.2	+41:05.5	0
29	33	(Portugal) Pedro Azeredo	(Portugal) Carlos Magalhaes	(Portugal) Renault Gest Galp	Renault Megane Maxi	4:49:09.6	+43:277.9	0
30	73	(Spain) Claudio Aldecoa	(Spain) Manuel Casanova	(Spain) Claudio Aldecoa	Mitsubishi Lancer Evo V	4:51:28.9	+45:47.2	0
31	57	(Portugal) Filipe Pinto	(Portugal) Redwan Cassamo	(Portugal) Filipe Pinto	Renault Clio Maxi	4:54:15.8	+48:34.1	0
32	89	(Andorra) Ferran Font	(Spain) Joan Sureda	(Andorra) Ferran Font	Mitsubishi Lancer Evo V	4:54:37.6	+48:55.9	0
33	68	(Portugal) Carlos Marques	(Portugal) Luis Cavaleiro	(Portugal) Carlos Marques	Mitsubishi Lancer Evo III	4:55:06.2	+49:24.5	0
34	63	(Spain) Michael Huete	(Spain) Xavier Amigo Colon	(Spain) Carlos Sainz Junior Team	SEAT Ibiza 2.0 GTi 16V	4:58:40.2	+52:58.5	0
35	61	(Spain) Txus Jaio	(Spain) David Moreno	(Spain) Carlos Sainz Junior Team	SEAT Ibiza GTi 16V	4:59:23.0	+53:41.3	0
36	69	(Portugal) Francisco Brites	(Portugal) Jose Luis Teixeira	(Portugal) Francisco Brites	Mitsubishi Lancer Evo V	4:59:40.8	+53:59.1	0
37	100	(France) Olivier Prive	(France) Philippe Guellerin	(France) Olivier Prive	Mitsubishi Lancer Evo V	4:59:45.6	+54:03.9	0
38	94	(Portugal) Rodrigo Ferreira	(Portugal) Luis Pinto	(Portugal) Rodrigo Ferreira	SEAT Ibiza 1.8 GTi 16V	5:06:58.8	+1:01:17.1	0
39	58	(Portugal) Augusto Magalhaes	(Portugal) Duarte Gouveia	(Portugal) Augusto Magalhaes	Mitsubishi Carisma GT Evo V	5:08:35.5	+1:02:53.8	0
40	64	(Portugal) Armando Parente	(Portugal) Jorge Carvalho	(Portugal) Armando Parente	Mitsubishi Lancer Evo V	5:11:13.8	+1:05:32.1	0
41	83	(Portugal) Jose Cunha	(Portugal) Jose Nunes	(Portugal) Jose Cunha	Lancia Delta HF Integrale	5:13:34.9	+1:07:53.2	0
42	91	(Portugal) Jose Pedro Santos	(Portugal) Manuel Fortuna	(Portugal) Jose Pedro Santos	Ford Escort RS Cosworth	5:17:07.4	+1:11:25.7	0
43	76	(United Kingdom) Nigel Heath	(United Kingdom) Tim Hely	(United Kingdom) Nigel Heath	Subaru Impreza WRX	5:20:44.1	+1:15:02.4	0
44	79	(Portugal) Manuel Rolo	(Portugal) Luis Ramalho	(Portugal) Manuel Rolo	SEAT Ibiza 1.8 GTi 16V	5:22:37.8	+1:16:56.1	0
45	92	(Spain) Juan Antonio Ruiz	(Spain) Palenzuela Francisco Cruz	(Spain) Juan Antonio Ruiz	SEAT Ibiza 2.0 GTi 16V	5:28:14.8	+1:22:33.1	0
46	67	(Spain) Oscar Fuertes	(Spain) Lucas Cruz	(Spain) Carlos Sainz Junior Team	SEAT Ibiza GTi 16V	5:29:56.9	+1:24:15.2	0
47	85	(Portugal) Ligia Albuquerque	(Portugal) Vitor Fernandes	(Portugal) Ligia Albuquerque	SEAT Ibiza Cupra	5:31:05.0	+1:25:23.3	0
48	119	(Portugal) Rui Almeida	(Portugal) Luis Costa	(Portugal) C.A.M. Ford Motorsport	Ford Ka	5:39:51.1	+1:34:09.4	0
49	78	(Portugal) Paulo Freire	Ribeiro Eduardo Portugal	(Portugal) Paulo Freire	Toyota Celica GT-Four	5:41:06.3	+1:35:24.6	0
50	106	(France) Denis Olivet	(France) Andre Fernandez	(France) Denis Olivet	Renault Clio 16S	5:41:06.3	+1:35:24.6	0
51	111	(Portugal) Luis Robalo	(Portugal) Fernando Prata	(Portugal) Luis Robalo	Nissan Micra 1.3 Super S	5:47:01.9	+1:41:20.2	0
52	112	(Portugal) Miguel Barata	(Portugal) Fernando Barata	(Portugal) Miguel Barata	Nissan Micra 1.3 Super S	5:57:01.0	+1:51:19.3	0
53	86	(Portugal) Joana Lemos	(Portugal) Cristina Teixeira	(France) Peugeot Esso Silver Team SG	Peugeot 106	6:09:34.6	+2:03:52.9	0
54	110	(United Kingdom) Christopher Shean	(Portugal) Rogerio Seromenho	(United Kingdom) Christopher Shean	Peugeot 205 Rallye	6:16:58.5	+2:11:16.8	0
55	116	(Portugal) Luis Novoa	(Portugal) Ariana Silva	(Portugal) Luis Novoa	Fiat Cinquecento Sport	6:17:35.1	+2:11:53.4	0
56	120	(Portugal) Parcidio Summavielle	(Portugal) Miguel Summavielle	(Portugal) Parcidio Summavielle	SEAT Marbella GL	6:20:55.4	+2:15:13.7	0
Retired SS22	82	(United Kingdom) David Scialom	(United Kingdom) Kevin Clark	(United Kingdom) David Scialom	Lancia Delta HF Integrale	Retired		0
Retired SS21	118	(Portugal) Jose Pessoa	(Portugal) Duarte Silva	(Portugal) Jose Pessoa	Fiat Cinquecanto Sport	Retired		0
Retired SS20	52	(Portugal) Vitor Pascoal	(Portugal) Duarte Costa	(Portugal) Vitor Pascoal	Mitsubishi Lancer Evo IV	Over Time Limit		0
Retired S20	55	(Portugal) Arlindo Quintas	(Portugal) Paulos Leones	(Portugal) Arlindo Quintas	Mitsubishi Carisma GT Evo IV	Transmission		0
Retired SS20	80	(Portugal) Jose Manuel Cerqueira	(Portugal) Rodrigues Antonio Sampaio	(Portugal) Jose Manuel Cerqueira	SEAT Ibiza 1.8 GTi 16V	Retired		0
Retired SS20	98	(Portugal) Albino Tristao	(Portugal) Fernando Sousa	(Portugal) Albino Tristao	Ford Escort RS Cosworth	Retired		0
Retired SS20	103	(Portugal) Jose Fernandes	(Portugal) Armando Veiga	(Portugal) Jose Fernandes	Toyota Corolla GTI	Retired		0
Retired SS17	104	(Portugal) Serafim Martins	(Portugal) Joao Lopes	(Portugal) Serafim Martins	Volkswagen Golf III GTi 16V	Retired		0
Retired SS16	2	(Finland) Marcus Gronholm	(Finland) Timo Rautiainen	(Japan) Marlboro Mitsubishi Ralliart	Mitsubishi Lancer Evo VI	Transmission		0
Retired SS16	6	(Finland) Juha Kankkunen	(Finland) Juha Repo	(Japan) Subaru World Rally Team	Impreza WRC 2006	Engine		0
Retired SS6	9	(Finland) Harri Rovanpera	(Finland) Risto Pietilainen	(Spain) SEAT Sport	SEAT Cordoba WRC	Accident		0
Retired SS16	54	(Portugal) Francisco Costa	(Portugal) Simeao Aguiar	(Portugal) Francisco Costa	Renault Clio Maxi	Retired		0
Retired SS16	115	(Portugal) Pedro Barbosa	(Portugal) Octavio Araujo	(Portugal) Pedro Barbosa	Nissan Micra 1.3 Super S	Retired		0
Retired SS15	107	(Portugal) Paulo Guimaraes	(Portugal) Rui Tavares	(Portugal) Paulo Guimaraes	Renault Clio 16S	Retired		0
Retired SS14	38	(Finland) Jouko Puhakka	(Finland) Jakke Honkanen	(Japan) Tyre Research Institute R.T.	Mitsubishi Lancer Evo V	Accident		0
Retired SS13	20	(Greece) Armodios Vovos	(Greece) Ioannis Alvanos	(Greece) Toyota Hellas	Toyota Corolla WRC	Steering		0
Retired SS13	81	(United Kingdom) John Morton	(United Kingdom) Eurig Evans	(United Kingdom) John Morton	Lancia Delta HF Integrale	Retired		0
Retired SS12	19	(Portugal) Pedro Matos Chaves	(Portugal) Sergio Paiva	(Portugal) Telcel Castrol Team	Toyota Corolla WRC	Engine		0
Retired SS11	10	(Italy) Piero Liatti	(Italy) Carlo Cassina	(Spain) SEAT Sport	SEAT Cordoba WRC	Accident		0
Retired SS11	17	(Estonia) Markko Martin	(Estonia) Toomas Kitsing	(Estonia) E.O.S. Rally Team Lukoil	Ford Escort WRC	Gearbox		0
Retired SS10	30	(Portugal) Jose Carlos Macedo	(Portugal) Miguel Borges	(Portugal) Renault Guest Galp	Renault Megane Maxi	Alternator		0
Retired SS10	59	(Portugal) Pedro Dias da Silva	(Portugal) Mario Castro	(Portugal) Optiroc Competicao	Citroen Saxo Cup	Suspension		0
Retired SS10	65	(Spain) Esteban Vallin	(Spain) Eduardo Escolano	(Spain) Carlos Sainz Junior Team	SEAT Ibiza	Suspension		0
Retired SS10	84	(Italy) Marta Candian	(Italy) Mara Biotti	(Italy) Hawk Racing Club Srl	Renault Clio Williams	Retired		0
Retired SS9	11	(Germany) Armin Schwarz	(Germany) Manfred Hiemer	(Czech Republic) Skoda Motorsport	Skoda Octavia WRC	Clutch		0
Retired SS9	12	(Czech Republic) Emil Triner	(Czech Republic) Milos Hulka	(Czech Republic) Skoda Motorsport	Skoda Octavia WRC	Clutch		0
Retired SS9	46	(Uruguay) Gabriel Mendez	(Uruguay) Daniel Muzio	(Uruguay) Gabriel Mendez	Mitsubishi Lancer Evo V	Accident		0
Retired SS9	117	(Portugal) Jorge Ferreira	(Portugal) Romulo Goncalves	(Portugal) F3 Auto	Fiat Cinquecento Sport	Retired		0
Retired SS8	70	(United Kingdom) Ken Skidmore	(United Kingdom) Steve Lancaster	(United Kingdom) Ken Skidmore	Mitsubishi Lancer Evo IV	Retired		0
Retired SS7	44	(Italy) Gianluigi Galli	(Italy) Guido D'Amore	(Italy) Gianluigi Galli	Mitsubishi Carisma GT Evo V	Gearbox		0
Retired SS6	18	(Finland) Pasi Hagstrom	(Finland) Tero Gardemeister	(Finland) H.F. Grifone SRL	Toyota Corolla WRC	Accident		0
Retired SS6	60	(Spain) Salvador Canellas	(Spain) Carlos del Barrio	(Spain) Salvador Canellas	SEAT Ibiza	Engine		0
Retired SS5	34	(Finland) Toni Gardemeister	(Finland) Paavo Lukander	(Finland) Astra Racing	SEAT Ibiza	Transmission		0
Retired SS5	37	(Austria) Manfred Stohl	(Austria) Peter Muller	(Austria) Manfred Stohl	Mitsubishi Lancer Evo V	Fuel Pump		0
Retired SS5	45	(New Zealand) Reece Jones	(New Zealand) Leo Bult	(New Zealand) Reece Jones	Mitsubishi Lancer Evo V	Accident		0
Retired SS5	45	(New Zealand) Reece Jones	(New Zealand) Leo Bult	(New Zealand) Reece Jones	Mitsubishi Lancer Evo V	Accident		0
Retired SS5	48	(Austria) Kris Rosenberger	(Sweden) Per Carlsson	(Austria) Kris Rosenberger	Mitsubishi Lancer Evo IV	Engine		0
Retired SS5	71	(United Kingdom) Stuart Coupe	(United Kingdom) Allan Whittaker	(United Kingdom) Stuart Coupe	Mitsubishi Lancer Evo V	Retired		0
Retired SS4	35	(Finland) Tapio Laukkanen	(Finland) Kaj Lindstrom	(France) Renault Elf Dealer Rallying	Renault Megane Maxi	Suspension		0
Retired SS4	102	(Portugal) Fernando Mendanha	(Portugal) Rui Losa	(Portugal) Fernando Mendanha	Peugeot 306 S16	Retired		0
Retired SS4	105	(Portugal) Agostinho Oliveira	(Portugal) Paulo Vilaca	(Portugal) Agostinho Oliveira	Citroen ZX 16V	Retired		0
Retired SS4	108	(Portugal) Rui Trindade	(Portugal) Mario Vaz	(Portugal) Rui Trindade	Peugeot 106 S16	Retired		0
Retired SS4	109	(Portugal) Victor Calisto	(Portugal) Antonio Cirne	(Portugal) Victor Calisto	Citroen ZX 16V	Retired		0
Retired SS4	113	(Portugal) Pedro Martins	(Portugal) Hugo Chumbo	(Portugal) Pedro Martins	Peugeot 205 Rallye	Retired		0
Retired SS4	114	(Portugal) Armando Silva	(Portugal) Humberto Freitas	(Portugal) Armando Silva	Citroen Saxo Cup	Retired		0
Retired SS4	121	(Spain) Simal Cesar Rodriguez	(Spain) Juan Carlos Asorey	(Spain) Simal Cesar Rodriguez	SEAT Marbella GL	Retired		0
Retired SS3	16	(Poland) Krzysztof Holowczyc	(Belgium) Jean-Marc Fortin	(Poland) Turning Point Rally Team	Subaru Impreza S5 WRC 98	Accident		0
Retired SS3	26	(Japan) Toshihiro Arai	(United Kingdom) Roger Freeman	(Japan) Subaru Allstars Endless Sport	Subaru Impreza S5 WRC 98	Accident		0
Retired SS2	40	(Oman) Hamed Al-Wahaibi	(New Zealand) Tony Sircombe	Team Mitsubishi Oman	Mitsubishi Lancer Evo V	Fuel Pump		0
Retired SS2	41	(Australia) Michael Guest	(Australia) David Green	(Australia) Winfield World Rally Team	Subaru Impreza WRX	Accident		0
Retired SS2	66	(Belgium) Bob Colsoul	(Belgium) Tom Colsoul	(Belgium) Bob Colsoul	Mitsubishi Lancer Evo IV	Retired		0
Retired SS2	77	(Portugal) Luis Fonseca	(Portugal) Miguel Soares	(Portugal) Luis Fonseca	Ford Escort RS Cosworth	Retired		0
Retired SS2	87	(Portugal) Paula Santos	(Portugal) Paulo Melo	(Portugal) Paula Santos	Ford Escort RS 2000 MKV	Accident		0
Retired SS2	93	(Portugal) Jose Pedro Miranda	(Portugal) Luis Costa	(Portugal) Jose Pedro Miranda	SEAT Ibiza 1.8 GTi 16V	Retired		0
Retired SS2	96	(Spain) Rodriguez Jose Esturao	(Spain) Luis Garcia	(Spain) Rodriguez Jose Esturao	SEAT Ibiza 1.8 GTi 16V	Retired		0
Retired SS2	97	(France) Jean-Yves Le Masson	(France) Jean-Charles Descamps	(France) Jean-Yves Le Masson	Honda Integra Type-R	Retired		0
Retired SS2	99	(Portugal) Delfim Bastos	(Portugal) Antonio Freitas	(Portugal) Delfim Bastos	Mazda 323 GT-R	Retired		0
Retired SS2	101	(Portugal) Antonio Faria	(Portugal) Jose Falcao	(Portugal) Antonio Faria	Volkswagen Golf III GTi 16V	Retired		0
Retired SS1	24	(Saudi Arabia) Abdullah Bakhashab	(United Kingdom) Michael Park	Toyota Team Saudi Arabia	Toyota Corolla WRC	Accident		0
Retired SS1	75	(Portugal) Jose Pereira	(Portugal) Franco Pereira	(Portugal) Jose Pereira	Subaru Impreza WRX	Retired		0

==== Special Stages ====
All dates and times are EAT (UTC+3).

Day	Stage	Time	Name	Length (km)	Winner	Time	Rally leader
1 21 Mar	SS1	14:15	Baltar	3.20	(United Kingdom) Colin McRae	3:12.3	(United Kingdom) Colin McRae
2 22 Mar	SS2	7:46	Ponte de Lima Este	23.64	(United Kingdom) Colin McRae	15:38.2	(United Kingdom) Colin McRae
2 22 Mar	SS3	8:39	Ponte de Lima Oeste	25.84	(United Kingdom) Colin McRae	18:39.2	(United Kingdom) Colin McRae
2 22 Mar	SS4	12:01	Fafe - Lameirinha 1	15.20	(Spain) Carlos Sainz	10:06.5	(United Kingdom) Colin McRae
2 22 Mar	SS5	12:25	Fafe - Luilhas 1	10.55	(United Kingdom) Richard Burns	7:51.7	(United Kingdom) Colin McRae
2 22 Mar	SS6	13:38	Cabreira 1	27.60	(United Kingdom) Colin McRae	18:11.1	(United Kingdom) Colin McRae
2 22 Mar	SS7	15:20	Fafe - Lameirinha 2	15.20	(France) Didier Auriol	10:03.5	(United Kingdom) Colin McRae
2 22 Mar	SS8	15:44	Fafe - Luilhas 2	10.55	(United Kingdom) Richard Burns	7:45.9	(United Kingdom) Colin McRae
2 22 Mar	SS9	16:47	Cabreira 2	27.60	(United Kingdom) Colin McRae	18:03.9	(United Kingdom) Colin McRae
3 23 Mar	SS10	7:59	Sever do Vouga	14.83	(France) Didier Auriol	11:15.5	(United Kingdom) Colin McRae
3 23 Mar	SS11	8:44	Ladario - Oliveira de Frades	11.26	(United Kingdom) Richard Burns	7:43.4	(United Kingdom) Colin McRae
3 23 Mar	SS12	11:19	Agueira	23.33	(France) Didier Auriol	16:53.1	(United Kingdom) Colin McRae
3 23 Mar	SS13	11:55	Mortazel	18.81	(Spain) Carlos Sainz	12:28.9	(United Kingdom) Colin McRae
3 23 Mar	SS14	12:25	Mortagua	17.24	(Spain) Carlos Sainz	11:41.7	(United Kingdom) Colin McRae
3 23 Mar	SS15	14:02	Tabua	13.49	(Finland) Tommi Makinen	8:23.0	(United Kingdom) Colin McRae
3 23 Mar	SS16	14:53	Arganil - Coja 1	20.96	(Spain) Carlos Sainz	13:03.8	(United Kingdom) Colin McRae
3 23 Mar	SS17	15:34	Salgueiro - Gois 1	19.70	(United Kingdom) Richard Burns	11:30.6	(United Kingdom) Colin McRae
3 23 Mar	SS18	17:44	Arganil - Coja 2	20.96	Cancelled		(United Kingdom) Colin McRae
3 23 Mar	SS19	18:25	Salgueiro - Gois 2	19.70	Cancelled		(United Kingdom) Colin McRae
4 24 Mar	SS20	9:55	Viso - Celorico de Basto	11.84	(Finland) Tommi Makinen	7:31.9	(United Kingdom) Colin McRae
4 24 Mar	SS21	10:48	Fridao	14.20	(Finland) Tommi Makinen	10:12.0	(United Kingdom) Colin McRae
4 24 Mar	SS22	11:34	Aboboreira	17.96	(Finland) Tommi Makinen	12:13.2	(United Kingdom) Colin McRae
4 24 Mar	SS23	12:55	Lousada - Barrosas	15.85	(France) Didier Auriol	11:53.4	(United Kingdom) Colin McRae

==== Championship Standings ====
Pos.	Drivers' Championship			Manufacturers' Championship		
Pos.	Move	Driver	Points	Move	Manufacturer	Points
1		(Finland) Tommi Makinen	22		(Japan) Toyota Castrol Team	33
2	2	(United Kingdom) Colin McRae	20	1	(United Kingdom) Ford Motor Co Ltd	28
3	1	(France) Didier Auriol	17	1	(Japan) Marlboro Mitsubishi Ralliart	22
4	1	(Spain) Carlos Sainz	16		(Japan) Subaru World Rally Team	13
5		(Finland) Juha Kankkunen	7		(Spain) SEAT Sport	7
