= 1999 World Rally Championship =

27th season of the FIA World Rally Championship

Champions
- World Drivers' Champion: Tommi Mäkinen
- World Manufacturers' Champion: Toyota

Seasons
- ← 1998 2000 →

The 1999 World Rally Championship was the 27th season of the FIA World Rally Championship. The season consisted of 14 rallies. Tommi Mäkinen won his fourth drivers' world championship driving for Mitsubishi, ahead of Richard Burns and Didier Auriol. The manufacturers' title was won by Toyota, ahead of Subaru and Mitsubishi.

In an upset predicted two years earlier a two-wheel-drive car won a rally for the first time since Alain Oreille won the 1989 Rallye Côte d'Ivoire in his Renault 5 when Philippe Bugalski took his Citroën Xsara Kit Car to victory in the Rally Catalunya. Bugalski backed it up three weeks later winning the Tour de Corse. With such specialised tarmac cars now beating WRC cars while at the same time not competing in the FIA 2-Litre World Rally Cup designed for them a revamp of two-wheel-drive regulations was created for the 2000 season.

== Calendar ==
The 1999 championship was contested over fourteen rounds in Europe, Africa, Asia, South America and Oceania.

| Rd. | Start date | Finish date | Rally | Rally headquarters | Surface | Stages | Distance |
|---|---|---|---|---|---|---|---|
| 1 | 17 January | 20 January | (Monaco) 67th Rallye Automobile Monte Carlo | Monte Carlo | Mixed | 14 | 424.69 km |
| 2 | 12 February | 14 February | (Sweden) 48th International Swedish Rally | Karlstad, Värmland County | Snow | 19 | 384.30 km |
| 3 | 25 February | 28 February | (Kenya) 47th 555 Safari Rally | Nairobi | Gravel | 13 | 1009.91 km |
| 4 | 21 March | 24 March | 33rd TAP Rallye de Portugal | Matosinhos, Porto | Gravel | 23 | 399.51 km |
| 5 | 19 April | 21 April | (Spain) 35th Rallye Catalunya - Costa Brava - Rallye de España | Lloret de Mar, Catalonia | Tarmac | 19 | 396.01 km |
| 6 | 7 May | 9 May | 43rd Tour de Corse - Rallye de France | Ajaccio, Corsica | Tarmac | 17 | 373.99 km |
| 7 | 22 May | 25 May | 19th Rally Argentina | Carlos Paz, Córdoba | Gravel | 22 | 396.63 km |
| 8 | 6 June | 9 June | (Greece) 46th Acropolis Rally | Agioi Theodoroi, Peloponnese | Gravel | 21 | 376.06 km |
| 9 | 15 July | 18 July | 30th Rally New Zealand | Manukau, Auckland | Gravel | 27 | 399.84 km |
| 10 | 20 August | 22 August | 49th Neste Rally Finland | Jyväskylä, Central Finland | Gravel | 23 | 377.26 km |
| 11 | 17 September | 19 September | 3rd 555 China Rally 1999 | Huairou, Beijing | Gravel | 22 | 385.72 km |
| 12 | 11 October | 13 October | (Italy) 49th Rallye Sanremo - Rallye d'Italia | Sanremo, Liguria | Tarmac | 18 | 384.88 km |
| 13 | 4 November | 7 November | 12th Telstra Rally Australia | Perth, Western Australia | Gravel | 23 | 395.88 km |
| 14 | 21 November | 23 November | (United Kingdom) 55th Network Q Rally of Great Britain | Cheltenham, Gloucestershire | Gravel | 22 | 389.39 km |

== Teams and drivers ==
World Rally Car entries ineligible to score manufacturer points
| Manufacturer | Car | Team | Tyre | No. | Drivers | Co-Drivers | Rounds |
|---|---|---|---|---|---|---|---|
| Mitsubishi | Lancer Evo VI | (Japan) Marlboro Mitsubishi Ralliart | M | 1 | (Finland) Tommi Mäkinen | (Finland) Risto Mannisenmäki | All |
| Mitsubishi | Lancer Evo VI | (Japan) Marlboro Mitsubishi Ralliart | M | 2 | (Belgium) Freddy Loix | (Belgium) Sven Smeets | 1–3, 5–14 |
| Mitsubishi | Lancer Evo VI | (Japan) Marlboro Mitsubishi Ralliart | M | 2 | (Finland) Marcus Grönholm | (Finland) Timo Rautiainen | 4 |
| Toyota | Corolla WRC | (Japan) Toyota Castrol Team | M | 3 | (Spain) Carlos Sainz | (Spain) Luis Moya | All |
| Toyota | Corolla WRC | (Japan) Toyota Castrol Team | M | 4 | (France) Didier Auriol | (France) Denis Giraudet | All |
| Toyota | Corolla WRC | (Japan) Toyota Castrol Team | P | 20 | (Germany) Isolde Holderied | (France) Catherine François | 1 |
| Toyota | Corolla WRC | (Japan) Toyota Castrol Team | M | 45 | (United Kingdom) Martin Brundle | (Sweden) Arne Hertz | 14 |
| Subaru | Impreza WRC99 | (Japan) Subaru World Rally Team | P | 5 | (United Kingdom) Richard Burns | (United Kingdom) Robert Reid | All |
| Subaru | Impreza WRC99 | (Japan) Subaru World Rally Team | P | 6 | (Finland) Juha Kankkunen | (Finland) Juha Repo | 1–4, 7–14 |
| Subaru | Impreza WRC99 | (Japan) Subaru World Rally Team | P | 6 | (Belgium) Bruno Thiry | (Belgium) Stéphane Prévot | 5–6 |
| Subaru | Impreza WRC99 | (Japan) Subaru World Rally Team | P | 14 | (Belgium) Bruno Thiry | (Belgium) Stéphane Prévot | 1–4 |
| Subaru | Impreza WRC99 | (Japan) Subaru World Rally Team | P | 14 | (Finland) Juha Kankkunen | (Finland) Juha Repo | 5 |
| Ford | Focus WRC | (United States) Ford Motor Co | M | 7 | (United Kingdom) Colin McRae | (United Kingdom) Nicky Grist | All |
| Ford | Focus WRC | (United States) Ford Motor Co | M | 8 | (France) Simon Jean-Joseph | (United Kingdom) Fred Gallagher | 1, 5–6, 12 |
| Ford | Focus WRC | (United States) Ford Motor Co | M | 8 | (Sweden) Thomas Rådström | (United Kingdom) Fred Gallagher | 2, 7–11, 13 |
| Ford | Focus WRC | (United States) Ford Motor Co | M | 8 | (Sweden) Thomas Rådström | (Sweden) Gunnar Barth | 14 |
| Ford | Focus WRC | (United States) Ford Motor Co | M | 8 | (Norway) Petter Solberg | (United Kingdom) Fred Gallagher | 3 |
| Ford | Focus WRC | (United States) Ford Motor Co | M | 8 | (Norway) Petter Solberg | (United Kingdom) Phil Mills | 4 |
| Ford | Focus WRC | (United States) Ford Motor Co | M | 20 | (Norway) Petter Solberg | (United Kingdom) Phil Mills | 14 |
| Ford | Focus WRC | (United States) Ford Motor Co | M | 25 | (Norway) Petter Solberg | (United Kingdom) Phil Mills | 12 |
| SEAT | Córdoba WRC 1-9; Córdoba WRC Evo2 10-14 | (Spain) SEAT Sport | P | 9 | (Finland) Harri Rovanperä | (Finland) Risto Pietiläinen | All |
| SEAT | Córdoba WRC 1-9; Córdoba WRC Evo2 10-14 | (Spain) SEAT Sport | P | 10 | (Italy) Piero Liatti | (Italy) Carlo Cassina | 1, 3–8, 11–12 |
| SEAT | Córdoba WRC 1-9; Córdoba WRC Evo2 10-14 | (Spain) SEAT Sport | P | 10 | (Finland) Marcus Grönholm | (Finland) Timo Rautiainen | 2 |
| SEAT | Córdoba WRC 1-9; Córdoba WRC Evo2 10-14 | (Spain) SEAT Sport | P | 10 | (Finland) Toni Gardemeister | (Finland) Paavo Lukander | 9–10, 13–14 |
| SEAT | Córdoba WRC 1-9; Córdoba WRC Evo2 10-14 | (Spain) SEAT Sport | P | 16 | (United Kingdom) Gwyndaf Evans | (United Kingdom) Howard Davies | 14 |
| SEAT | Córdoba WRC 1-9; Córdoba WRC Evo2 10-14 | (Spain) SEAT Sport | P | 20 | (Finland) Toni Gardemeister | (Finland) Paavo Lukander | 12 |
| Škoda | Octavia WRC | (Czech Republic) Škoda Motorsport | M | 11 | (Germany) Armin Schwarz | (Germany) Manfred Hiemer | 1, 4–5, 8, 10, 12, 14 |
| Škoda | Octavia WRC | (Czech Republic) Škoda Motorsport | M | 12 | (Czech Republic) Pavel Sibera | (Czech Republic) Petr Gross | 1, 5 |
| Škoda | Octavia WRC | (Czech Republic) Škoda Motorsport | M | 12 | (Czech Republic) Emil Triner | (Czech Republic) Miloš Hůlka | 4, 8, 10, 12 |
| Škoda | Octavia WRC | (Czech Republic) Škoda Motorsport | M | 12 | (Belgium) Bruno Thiry | (Belgium) Stéphane Prévot | 14 |
| Peugeot | 206 WRC | (France) Peugeot Esso | M | 14 | (France) François Delecour | (France) Daniel Grataloup | 6, 8, 10, 12–14 |
| Peugeot | 206 WRC | (France) Peugeot Esso | M | 15 | (Finland) Marcus Grönholm | (Finland) Timo Rautiainen | 8, 10, 13–14 |
| Peugeot | 206 WRC | (France) Peugeot Esso | M | 15 | (France) Gilles Panizzi | (France) Herve Panizzi | 6, 12 |
| Peugeot | 206 WRC | (France) Peugeot Esso | M | 16 | (France) Gilles Panizzi | (France) Herve Panizzi | 10 |
| Peugeot | 206 WRC | (France) Peugeot Esso | M | 21 | (Finland) Marcus Grönholm | (Finland) Timo Rautiainen | 12 |
| Peugeot | 206 WRC | (France) Peugeot Esso | M | 22 | (France) Gilles Panizzi | (France) Herve Panizzi | 14 |

World Rally Car entries ineligible to score manufacturer points
| Manufacturer | Car | Team | Tyre | Drivers | Co-drivers | Rounds |
|---|---|---|---|---|---|---|
| Subaru | Impreza WRC98 | (France) Gilles Panizzi | M | (France) Gilles Panizzi | (France) Herve Panizzi | 1 |
| Subaru | Impreza WRC98 | (Italy) A.R.T Engineering | P | (Italy) Andrea Dallavilla | (Italy) Danilo Fappani | 1, 12 |
| Subaru | Impreza WRC98 | (Italy) Procar Rally Team | P | (Monaco) Jean-Pierre Richelmi | (Monaco) Freddy Delorme | 8 |
| Subaru | Impreza WRC98 | (Italy) Procar Rally Team | P | (Italy) Diego Oldrati | (Italy) Dario D'Esposito | 12 |
| Subaru | Impreza WRC98 | (Greece) Ioannis Papadimitriou | M | (Greece) Ioannis Papadimitriou | (Greece) Nikolaos Petropoulos | 8, 14 |
| Subaru | Impreza WRC98 | (Japan) Subaru Allstars Endless Sport | P | (Japan) Toshihiro Arai | (United Kingdom) Roger Freeman | 4–6, 8 |
| Subaru | Impreza WRC98 | Subaru Rally Team Australia | P | (New Zealand) Peter 'Possum' Bourne | (New Zealand) Craig Vincent | 9, 13 |
| Subaru | Impreza WRC98 | (Italy) Treviso Rally Team | P | (Italy) Paolo Andreucci | (Italy) Giovanni Bernacchini | 12 |
| Subaru | Impreza WRC98 | (Germany) Subaru Rallye Team Deutschland | P | (Germany) Armin Kremer | (Germany) Fred Berssen | 14 |
| Subaru | Impreza WRC98 | (Poland) Wizja TV / Turning Point RT | M | (Poland) Krzysztof Hołowczyc | (Belgium) Jean-Marc Fortin | 2, 4, 14 |
| Subaru | Impreza WRC98 | (France) F.Dor Rally Team | M | (France) Frédéric Dor | (France) Didier Breton | 4, 8, 10, 13 |
| Subaru | Impreza WRC98 | (France) F.Dor Rally Team | M | (France) Frédéric Dor | (United Kingdom) Kevin Gormley | 3, 7, 9 |
| Subaru | Impreza WRC98 | (France) F.Dor Rally Team | M | (United Kingdom) Mark Fisher | (United Kingdom) Kevin Gormley | 14 |
| Subaru | Impreza WRC98 | (Spain) Valencia Terra y Mar | M | (Spain) Luis Climent | (Spain) Álex Romaní | 4-6, 10, 12, 14 |
| Ford | Escort WRC | (United States) Ford Motor Co | M | (Norway) Petter Solberg | (United Kingdom) Phil Mills | 2 |
| Ford | Escort WRC | (France) François Delecour | M | (France) François Delecour | (France) Dominique Savignoni | 1 |
| Ford | Escort WRC | (Russia) Gazprom Rally Team | M | (Finland) Sebastian Lindholm | (Finland) Jukka Aho | 2 |
| Ford | Escort WRC | Ford Team Finland | M | (Finland) Sebastian Lindholm | (Finland) Jukka Aho | 10 |
| Ford | Escort WRC | (Estonia) EOS Rally Team | M | (Estonia) Markko Märtin | (Estonia) Toomas Kitsing | 2, 4 |
| Ford | Escort WRC | (Finland) LPM Human Heat | P | (Finland) Janne Tuohino | (Finland) Miikka Anttila | 10, 14 |
| Ford | Escort WRC | (Italy) Jolly Club | P | (Italy) Andrea Navarra | (Italy) Simona Fedeli | 12 |
| Ford | Escort WRC | (Poland) Marlboro / Mobil 1 Rally Team | M | (Poland) Janusz Kulig | (Poland) Jarosław Baran | 14 |
| Ford | Escort WRC | (Norway) Henning Solberg | P | (Norway) Henning Solberg | (Norway) Runar Pedersen | 14 |
| Ford | Focus WRC | (Norway) Petter Solberg | M | (Norway) Petter Solberg | (United Kingdom) Phil Mills | 10 |
| Toyota | Corolla WRC | Toyota Castrol Team Germany | P | (Germany) Isolde Holderied | (France) Catherine François | 5–6, 12 |
| Toyota | Corolla WRC | Toyota Castrol Team Germany | M | (Germany) Matthias Kahle | (Germany) Dieter Schneppenheim | 4, 8–9, 14 |
| Toyota | Corolla WRC | Toyota Castrol Team Denmark | M | (Denmark) Henrik Lundgaard | (Denmark) Jens-Christian Anker | 1, 5–6, 12 |
| Toyota | Corolla WRC | Toyota Castrol Team Finland | M | (Finland) Pasi Hagström | (Finland) Tero Gardemeister | 2, 4, 10 |
| Toyota | Corolla WRC | (Estonia) EOS Rally Team | M | (Estonia) Markko Märtin | (Estonia) Toomas Kitsing | 8, 10, 12, 14 |
| Toyota | Corolla WRC | Toyota Kenya | M | (Kenya) Ian Duncan | (Kenya) David Williamson | 3 |
| Toyota | Corolla WRC | (Portugal) Telecel Castrol Team | M | (Portugal) Pedro Chaves | (Portugal) Sérgio Paiva | 4 |
| Toyota | Corolla WRC | (Greece) Toyota Hellas | P | (Greece) Armodios Vovos | (Greece) Ioánnis Alvanos | 4, 8 |
| Toyota | Corolla WRC | (Japan) Tein Sport | M | (Japan) Takuma Kamada | (Malaysia) Allen Oh | 9, 11 |
| Toyota | Corolla WRC | (Spain) Jesús Puras | M | (Spain) Jesús Puras | (Spain) Marc Martí | 11, 14 |
| Toyota | Corolla WRC | (Italy) H.F. Grifone SRL | M | (Italy) Andrea Aghini | (Italy) Loris Roggia | 12 |
| Toyota | Corolla WRC | (Italy) H.F. Grifone SRL | M | (Italy) Nicola Caldani | (Italy) Maurizio Barone | 12 |
| Toyota | Corolla WRC | (Italy) H.F. Grifone SRL | M | (Italy) Carlo Zucchetti | (Italy) Renzo Casazza | 12 |
| Toyota | Corolla WRC | Toyota Team Australia | M | (Australia) Neal Bates | (Australia) Coral Taylor | 13 |
| Toyota | Corolla WRC | Toyota Team Saudi Arabia | M | (Saudi Arabia) Abdullah Bakhashab | (United Kingdom) Michael Park | 2, 4–6, 8, 11–12, 14 |
| Toyota | Corolla WRC | Toyota Mobil Team Turkey | M | (Turkey) Volkan Isik | (Turkey) Erkan Bodur | 4–5, 7–8, 10–12 |

=== FIA 2-Litre World Rally Cup Manufacturer Entries ===
| Team | Manufacturer | Car | Tyre | Drivers | Co-drivers | Rounds |
|---|---|---|---|---|---|---|
| (Italy) Andrea Maselli | Renault | Clio Williams | P | (Italy) Andrea Maselli | (Italy) Nicola Arena | 1, 5–6 |
| (France) Frédéric Maniccia | Renault | Clio Williams | | (France) Frédéric Maniccia | (France) Richard Thaon | 1 |
| (Sweden) Jennie-Lee Hermansson | Renault | Clio Williams | | (Sweden) Jennie-Lee Hermansson | (Sweden) Stefan Bergman | 2 |
| (France) Gaël Lecerf | Renault | Clio Williams | | (France) Gaël Lecerf | (France) Yvon Catala | 9 |
| (United Kingdom) Renault Elf Dealer Rallying | Renault | Mégane Maxi | M | (United Kingdom) Martin Rowe | (United Kingdom) Derek Ringer | 4, 6, 10, 12–14 |
| (United Kingdom) Renault Elf Dealer Rallying | Renault | Mégane Maxi | M | (Finland) Tapio Laukkanen | (Finland) Kaj Lindström | 4, 6, 10, 12–14 |
| (Portugal) Renault Gest Galp | Renault | Mégane Maxi | M | (Portugal) Pedro Azeredo | (Portugal) Carlos Magalhães | 4 |
| (Spain) Renault Sport España | Renault | Mégane Maxi | M | (Spain) Oriol Gómez | (Spain) Oriol Julià Pascual | 5 |
| (France) Yacco Rally Team | Renault | Mégane Maxi | M | (France) Benoît Rousselot | (France) Jack Boyère | 6 |
| Renault Sport Belgium | Renault | Mégane Maxi | M | (Belgium) Kris Princen | (Belgium) Dany Colebunders | 8, 12 |
| Renault Sport Greece | Renault | Mégane Maxi | M | (Greece) "Leonidas" | (Greece) Maria Pavli-Korre | 8 |
| (Italy) Treviso Rally Team | Renault | Mégane Maxi | M | (Italy) Piero Longhi | (Italy) Lucio Baggio | 12 |
| Renault Sport Austria | Renault | Mégane Maxi | M | (Austria) Raphael Sperrer | (Sweden) Per Carlsson | 12 |
| (Argentina) Ricardo Bissio | Renault | 18 GTX | | (Argentina) Ricardo Bissio | (Argentina) Claudio Henin | 7 |
| (Argentina) Heriberto Ortiz | Renault | 18 GTX | | (Argentina) Heriberto Ortiz | (Argentina) Guillermo Flores | 7 |
| (South Korea) Hyundai Motorsport | Hyundai | Coupe Evo 2 | M | (Sweden) Kenneth Eriksson | (Sweden) Staffan Parmander | 2, 4–5, 8–14 |
| (South Korea) Hyundai Motorsport | Hyundai | Coupe Evo 2 | M | (United Kingdom) Alister McRae | (United Kingdom) David Senior | 2, 4–5, 8–14 |
| (Kenya) Phineas Kimathi | Hyundai | Coupe | | (Kenya) Phineas Kimathi | (Kenya) Abdul Sidi | 3 |
| (United Kingdom) Graham Middleton | Hyundai | Coupe | M | (United Kingdom) Graham Middleton | (United Kingdom) John Morgan | 14 |
| (Greece) Giórgos Vomvilas | Hyundai | Accent | S | (Greece) Giórgos Vomvilas | (Greece) Ioánnis Athanassiou | 8 |
| Volkswagen Motorsport Sweden | Volkswagen | Golf III Kit Car | | (Sweden) Harry Joki | (Sweden) Ingemar Karlsson | 2 |
| Volkswagen Motorsport Sweden | Volkswagen | Golf III Kit Car | | (Sweden) Andreas Eriksson | (Sweden) Patrick Henriksson | 2 |
| (Finland) Blue Rose Team | Volkswagen | Golf III Kit Car | P | (Finland) Jani Pirttinen | (Finland) Timo Hantunen | 2, 10 |
| Volkswagen Motorsport Australia | Volkswagen | Golf III Kit Car | Y | (Australia) Simon Evans | (Australia) Sue Evans | 9, 13 |
| (Finland) Janne Vähämiko | Volkswagen | Golf III Kit Car | P | (Finland) Janne Vähämiko | (Finland) Veijo Vainio | 10 |
| (United Kingdom) Volkswagen Motorsport UK | Volkswagen | Golf IV Kit Car | P | (United Kingdom) Mark Higgins | (United Kingdom) Bryan Thomas | 10, 13–14 |
| (Poland) Polsat Dialog Rally Team | Volkswagen | Golf III Kit Car | M | (Poland) Tomasz Kuchar | (Poland) Maciej Szczepaniak | 12 |

=== FIA 2-Litre World Rally Cup Non Manufacturer Entries ===
| Team | Manufacturer | Car | Tyre | Drivers | Co-drivers | Rounds |
|---|---|---|---|---|---|---|
| (Italy) Astra Racing | SEAT | Ibiza Kit Car Evo2 | P | (Finland) Toni Gardemeister | (Finland) Paavo Lukander | 1–2, 4 |
| Seat Dealer Team Sweden | SEAT | Ibiza Kit Car Evo2 | | (Sweden) Jörgen Jonasson | (Sweden) Pecka Svensson | 2 |
| Seat Dealer Team Sweden | SEAT | Ibiza Kit Car Evo2 | | (Sweden) Patric Carlsson | (Sweden) Peter Johansson | 2 |
| (Spain) RACC Motorsport | SEAT | Ibiza Kit Car Evo2 | P | (Spain) Salvador Cañellas | (Spain) Carlos del Barrio | 2, 4 |
| (United Kingdom) Seat Sport UK | SEAT | Ibiza Kit Car Evo2 | P | (United Kingdom) Gwyndaf Evans | (United Kingdom) Howard Davies | 7 |
| (United Kingdom) Seat Sport UK | SEAT | Ibiza Kit Car Evo2 | P | (United Kingdom) Mike Brown | (United Kingdom) Aled Davies | 14 |
| (France) Citroën Sport | Citroën | Saxo Kit Car | M | (France) Philippe Bugalski | (France) Jean-Paul Chiaroni | 1 |
| (France) Citroën Sport | Citroën | Saxo Kit Car | M | (Spain) Jesús Puras | (Spain) Marc Martí | 1 |
| (France) Citroën Sport | Citroën | Saxo Kit Car | M | (Portugal) Vítor Lopes | (Portugal) José Janela | 4 |
| (France) Citroën Sport | Citroën | Xsara F2 | M | (France) Philippe Bugalski | (France) Jean-Paul Chiaroni | 5–6, 12 |
| (France) Citroën Sport | Citroën | Xsara F2 | M | (Spain) Jesús Puras | (Spain) Marc Martí | 5–6, 12 |
| Equipe de France FFSA | Citroën | Saxo Kit Car | M | (France) Sébastien Loeb | (Monaco) Daniel Elena | 5–6, 12 |
| Equipe de France FFSA | Citroën | Saxo Kit Car | M | (France) Fabien Véricel | (France) Vincent Ducher | 5–6, 12 |
| Opel Team Sweden | Opel | Astra Kit Car | M | (Sweden) Per Svan | (Sweden) Johan Olsson | 2 |
| Opel Team Sweden | Opel | Astra Kit Car | M | (Sweden) Anders Nilsson | (Sweden) Markku Kangas | 2 |
| (United States) Ford Motor Co | Ford | Puma Kit Car | M | (Sweden) Stig Blomqvist | (Sweden) Benny Melander | 2 |
| (United States) Ford Motor Co | Ford | Puma Kit Car | M | (France) Patrick Magaud | (France) Guylène Brun | 5, 12 |
| (United States) Ford Motor Co | Ford | Puma Kit Car | M | (France) Priscille De Belloy | (France) Christiane Nicolet | 5, 12 |
| (United States) Ford Motor Co | Ford | Puma Kit Car | M | (France) Simon Jean-Joseph | (France) Patrick Pivato | 8, 10 |
| (Portugal) Peugeot Esso Silver Team SG | Peugeot | 306 Maxi | M | (Portugal) Adruzilo Lopes | (Portugal) Luís Lisboa | 4–5, 12 |
| (Spain) Peugeot Sport España | Peugeot | 306 Maxi | M | (Spain) Manuel Muniente | (Spain) Diego Vallejo | 5 |
| (Italy) F.P.F. Sport | Peugeot | 306 Maxi | M | (Italy) Renato Travaglia | (Italy) Flavio Zanella | 12 |
| (Japan) Silverstone Suzuki Sport | Suzuki | Baleno Wagon Kit Car | S | (Japan) Nobuhiro Tajima | (Thailand) Visut Sukosi | 9, 11 |
| (United Kingdom) Vauxhall Motorsport | Vauxhall | Astra Kit Car | M | (Finland) Jarmo Kytölehto | (Finland) Arto Kapanen | 10, 12, 14 |
| (United Kingdom) Vauxhall Motorsport | Vauxhall | Astra Kit Car | M | (United Kingdom) Neil Wearden | (United Kingdom) Trevor Agnew | 10, 12, 14 |
| (Malaysia) Proton Motorsport | Proton | Satria Kit Car | M | (Australia) William Hayes | (Australia) Stefan Cecconi | 13 |
| (Malaysia) Proton Motorsport | Proton | Satria Kit Car | M | (Australia) Mathew Knox | (Australia) Karl Francis | 13 |
| (Malaysia) Proton Motorsport | Proton | Satria Kit Car | M | (Sweden) Mats Andersson | (United Kingdom) Claire Mole | 14 |
| (Malaysia) Proton Motorsport | Proton | Satria Kit Car | M | (United Kingdom) Tony Jardine | (United Kingdom) Kevin Piper | 14 |

=== Group N Cup major entries ===
| Team | Manufacturer | Car | Tyre | Drivers | Co-drivers | Rounds |
|---|---|---|---|---|---|---|
| (Belgium) Team Gamma | Mitsubishi | Lancer Carisma GT Evo V | M | (Belgium) Marc Duez | (France) Philippe Dupuy | 1 |
| (Italy) Ralliart Italia | Mitsubishi | Lancer Evo V | P | (Uruguay) Gustavo Trelles | (Uruguay) Martin Christie | 1–2, 4–5, 7, 9, 11, 12 |
| (Italy) Ralliart Italia | Mitsubishi | Lancer Evo VI | P | (Uruguay) Gustavo Trelles | (Uruguay) Martin Christie | 6, 8, 10, 12 |
| (Italy) Ralliart Italia | Mitsubishi | Lancer Evo V | P | (Uruguay) Gabriel Méndez | (Uruguay) Daniel Muzio | 4–9, 13 |
| (Austria) Stohl Racing | Mitsubishi | Lancer Evo V | P | (Austria) Manfred Stohl | (Austria) Peter Müller | 1–8 |
| (Austria) Stohl Racing | Mitsubishi | Lancer Evo VI | P | (Austria) Manfred Stohl | (Austria) Peter Müller | 10, 12, 14 |
| (Spain) Valencia Terra y Mar | Mitsubishi | Lancer Evo III | M | (Spain) Luis Climent | (Spain) Álex Romaní | 1–3 |
| Andorra Auto Club | Mitsubishi | Lancer Evo V | | (Andorra) Ferran Font | (Spain) Joan Sureda | 5–6, 11 |
| (Finland) Tyre Research Institute R.T. | Mitsubishi | Lancer Evo IV | M | (Finland) Jouko Puhakka | (Finland) Jakke Honkanen | 2 |
| (Finland) Tyre Research Institute R.T. | Mitsubishi | Lancer Evo V | M | (Finland) Jouko Puhakka | (Finland) Jakke Honkanen | 4–6, 10 |
| Mitsubishi Ralliart Sweden | Mitsubishi | Lancer Evo IV | M | (Sweden) Stig-Olov Walfridsson | (Sweden) Jan Svanström | 2 |
| Mitsubishi Ralliart Sweden | Mitsubishi | Lancer Evo IV | M | (Sweden) Kenneth Bäcklund | (Sweden) Tord Andersson | 10 |
| Mitsubishi Ralliart Finland | Mitsubishi | Lancer Carisma GT Evo IV | M | (Finland) Juuso Pykälistö | (Finland) Esko Mertsalmi | 2, 10 |
| Mitsubishi Ralliart Finland | Mitsubishi | Lancer Carisma GT Evo IV | M | (Finland) Jani Paasonen | (Finland) Arto Kapanen | 2 |
| Mitsubishi Ralliart Finland | Mitsubishi | Lancer Carisma GT Evo VI | M | (Finland) Jani Paasonen | (Finland) Kari Jokinen | 10 |
| Mitsubishi Ralliart Finland | Mitsubishi | Lancer Carisma GT Evo V | M | (Finland) Jouni Ampuja | (Finland) Jani Laaksonen | 10 |
| (Sweden) Mats Karlsson | Mitsubishi | Lancer Evo III | | (Sweden) Mats Karlsson | (Sweden) Arne Hertz | 2 |
| (Italy) Mauro Rally Tuning | Mitsubishi | Lancer Carisma GT Evo V | P | (Italy) Gianluigi Galli | (Italy) Guido D'Amore | 2, 4–6, 10, 12 |
| (Austria) Kris Rosenberger | Mitsubishi | Lancer Evo V | | (Austria) Kris Rosenberger | (Sweden) Per Carlsson | 2, 4–7 |
| (Sweden) Team Walfridsson | Mitsubishi | Lancer Carisma GT Evo V | M | (Sweden) Pernilla Solberg | (Sweden) Ulrika Mattsson | 2, 4–5, 10, 14 |
| (Japan) Mitsubishi Ralliart | Mitsubishi | Lancer Carisma GT Evo V | P | (Oman) Hamed Al-Wahaibi | (New Zealand) Tony Sircombe | 2–3 |
| (Japan) Mitsubishi Ralliart | Mitsubishi | Lancer Evo V | Y | (Australia) Ed Ordynski | (Australia) Iain Stewart | 13 |
| Team Mitsubishi Oman | Mitsubishi | Lancer Evo V | P | (Oman) Hamed Al-Wahaibi | (New Zealand) Tony Sircombe | 4–13 |
| (Portugal) Mitsubishi Galp | Mitsubishi | Lancer Carisma GT Evo V | M | (Portugal) Miguel Campos | (Portugal) Miguel Ramalho | 4 |
| (Portugal) Miguel Cristóvão | Mitsubishi | Lancer Evo V | | (Portugal) Miguel Cristóvão | (Portugal) João Luz | 4 |
| (Portugal) Team Além Mar | Mitsubishi | Lancer Evo IV | | (Portugal) Horácio Franco | (Portugal) Tiago Mourão | 4 |
| (New Zealand) Reece Jones Rallysport | Mitsubishi | Lancer Evo V | | (New Zealand) Reece Jones | (New Zealand) Leo Bult | 4–6, 9 |
| (Italy) Mirabella Mille Miglia | Mitsubishi | Lancer Evo V | | (Italy) Giovanni Manfrinato | (Italy) Claudio Condotta | 5, 12 |
| (Czech Republic) Slovnaft Rally Team | Mitsubishi | Lancer Carisma GT Evo V | P | (Czech Republic) Michal Gargulák | (Czech Republic) Jiří Malčík | 6 |
| (France) Jean-Marie Santoni | Mitsubishi | Lancer Carisma GT Evo VI | M | (France) Jean-Marie Santoni | (France) Jean-Marc Casamatta | 6 |
| (Argentina) Jorge Recalde | Mitsubishi | Lancer Evo V | P | (Argentina) Jorge Recalde | (Argentina) José Garcia | 7 |
| (Argentina) Oscar Chiaramello | Mitsubishi | Lancer Evo V | | (Argentina) Oscar Chiaramello | (Argentina) Fernando Chiaramello | 7 |
| (Argentina) Miguel Centeno | Mitsubishi | Lancer Evo IV | | (Argentina) Miguel Centeno | (Argentina) Edsel Bruno | 7 |
| (Greece) Dimitris Nassoulas | Mitsubishi | Lancer Evo III | P | (Greece) Dimitris Nassoulas | (Greece) Iosif Galerakis | 8 |
| Mitsubishi Ralliart Malaysia | Mitsubishi | Lancer Evo VI | Y | (Japan) Katsuhiko Taguchi | (Malaysia) Ron Teoh | 9, 11, 13 |
| (Japan) Team Advan Ralliart | Mitsubishi | Lancer Evo VI | Y | (Japan) Yoshihiro Kataoka | (Japan) Satoshi Hayashi | 9, 13 |
| (Japan) Team Advan Ralliart | Mitsubishi | Lancer Evo V | Y | (Japan) Yoshihiro Kataoka | (Japan) Satoshi Hayashi | 11 |
| (Japan) Team Advan Ralliart | Mitsubishi | Lancer Evo V | Y | (Japan) Fumio Nutahara | (Japan) Noriyuki Odagiri | 9, 11 |
| (Hong Kong) Chi Wah Chan | Mitsubishi | Lancer Evo V | | (Hong Kong) Chi Wah Chan | (Hong Kong) Po Lin Tang | 9, 11 |
| (Italy) Conegliano Corse | Mitsubishi | Lancer Carisma GT Evo VI | P | (Italy) Mario Stagni | (Italy) Roberto Paganoni | 12 |
| (Italy) Conegliano Corse | Mitsubishi | Lancer Carisma GT Evo V | P | (Italy) Luca Baldini | (Italy) Massimo Agostinelli | 12 |
| (Italy) Rubicone Corse | Mitsubishi | Lancer Evo V | | (Italy) Sandro Sottile | (Italy) Luca De Rizzo | 12 |
| (Germany) Uwe Nittel | Mitsubishi | Lancer Evo V | P | (Germany) Uwe Nittel | (United Kingdom) Terry Harryman | 13 |
| (United Kingdom) Nigel Heath | Mitsubishi | Lancer Evo III | | (United Kingdom) Nigel Heath | (United Kingdom) Jeff Ashfield | 13 |
| (United Kingdom) Gavin Cox | Mitsubishi | Lancer Evo VI | | (United Kingdom) Gavin Cox | (United Kingdom) Tim Hobbs | 14 |
| (United Kingdom) Mark Perrott | Mitsubishi | Lancer Evo VI | | (United Kingdom) Mark Perrott | (United Kingdom) Andrew Sankey | 14 |
| (United Kingdom) Richard Davis | Mitsubishi | Lancer Evo V | | (United Kingdom) Richard Davis | (United Kingdom) David Williams | 14 |
| Mitsubishi Ralliart New Zealand | Mitsubishi | Lancer Evo V | | (New Zealand) Geoff Argyle | (New Zealand) Bernard Teal | 9 |
| Mitsubishi Ralliart New Zealand | Mitsubishi | Lancer Evo VI | | (New Zealand) Geoff Argyle | (New Zealand) Bernard Teal | 13 |
| Mitsubishi Ralliart New Zealand | Mitsubishi | Lancer Evo IV | | (New Zealand) Lewis Scott | (New Zealand) Jane Black | 9 |
| (France) Christophe Spiliotis | Subaru | Impreza WRX | M | (France) Christophe Spiliotis | (France) Hervé Thibaud | 1 |
| (France) Christophe Arnaud | Subaru | Impreza WRX | | (France) Christophe Arnaud | (France) Stéphane Arnaud | 1 |
| (United Kingdom) Nigel Heath | Subaru | Impreza WRX | M | (United Kingdom) Nigel Heath | (United Kingdom) Chris Patterson | 1 |
| (United Kingdom) Nigel Heath | Subaru | Impreza WRX | M | (United Kingdom) Nigel Heath | (United Kingdom) Tim Hely | 4, 8, 10 |
| Subaru Rally Team Japan | Subaru | Impreza WRX | | (Japan) Hideaki Miyoshi | (Japan) Eido Osawa | 3 |
| Subaru Rally Team Japan | Subaru | Impreza WRX | P | (Japan) Toshihiro Arai | (United Kingdom) Roger Freeman | 9, 11, 13 |
| Subaru Rally Team Japan | Subaru | Impreza WRX | | (Japan) Shigeyuki Konishi | (Australia) Glenn Macneall | 9, 11, 13 |
| (United Kingdom) John Lloyd | Subaru | Impreza WRX | | (United Kingdom) John Lloyd | (United Kingdom) David Horsey | 3, 14 |
| (Kenya) Shahnawaz Murji | Subaru | Impreza WRX | | (Kenya) Shahnawaz Murji | (Kenya) Mohammed Verjee | 3 |
| (Finland) Juha Kangas | Subaru | Impreza WRX | | (Finland) Juha Kangas | (Finland) Mika Ovaskainen | 2, 4–5, 8, 10 |
| (Peru) Ramón Ferreyros | Subaru | Impreza WRX | M | (Peru) Ramón Ferreyros | (Peru) Gonzalo Saenz | 4, 8, 11, 14 |
| (Australia) Winfield World Rally Team | Subaru | Impreza WRX | D | (Australia) Michael Guest | (Australia) David Green | 4–5, 8–9, 11, 13 |
| (Argentina) Claudio Marcelo Menzi | Subaru | Impreza WRX | | (Argentina) Claudio Marcelo Menzi | (Argentina) Rodolfo Amelio Ortiz | 7 |
| (Argentina) Santos Manzanares | Subaru | Impreza WRX | | (Argentina) Santos Manzanares | (Argentina) Adriana Manzanares | 7 |
| (Argentina) Roberto Sanchez | Subaru | Impreza WRX | P | (Argentina) Roberto Sanchez | (Argentina) Edgardo Galindo | 7 |
| Subaru Rally Team Australia | Subaru | Impreza WRX | P | (Australia) Cody Crocker | (Australia) Greg Foletta | 9, 13 |
| (Japan) Yujiro Nishio | Subaru | Impreza WRX | | (Japan) Yujiro Nishio | (Japan) Akiko Yamaguchi | 9, 13 |
| (Spain) Jesús Puras | Subaru | Impreza WRX | M | (Spain) Jesús Puras | (Spain) Marc Martí | 10 |
| (Spain) Gamace MC Competición | Subaru | Impreza WRX | M | (Spain) Jordi Grinyó | (Spain) Samira Lanaya | 5 |
| (United Kingdom) Richard Tuthill | Subaru | Impreza WRX | | (United Kingdom) Richard Tuthill | (United Kingdom) Roger Freeman | 4–5, 7 |
| (United Kingdom) David Wood | Subaru | Impreza WRX | | (United Kingdom) David Wood | (United Kingdom) Les Waterfall | 7 |
| (Belgium) Autostal Duindistel | Subaru | Impreza 555 | P | (Belgium) Gaby Goudezeune | (Belgium) Filip De Pelsemaeker | 8 |
| (Australia) Dean Herridge | Subaru | Impreza 555 | | (Australia) Dean Herridge | (Australia) Jim Carlton | 13 |
| (Italy) Procar Rally Team | Subaru | Impreza 555 | P | (Portugal) Rui Madeira | (Portugal) Nuno Rodrigues da Silva | 4 |
| (Greece) Ioannis Papadimitriou | Subaru | Impreza 555 | M | (Greece) Ioannis Papadimitriou | (Greece) Nikolaos Petropoulos | 4 |
| (Italy) Treviso Rally Team | Subaru | Impreza 555 | P | (Italy) Corrado Fontana | (Italy) Massimo Sacchettino | 12 |
| (Spain) Valencia Terra y Mar | Subaru | Impreza 555 | M | (Spain) Luis Climent | (Spain) Álex Romaní | 4, 8 |
| (United Kingdom) Barretts Motorsport | Peugeot | 306 S16 | | (France) David Truphemus | (France) Pascal Saivre | 1 |
| (Malaysia) Petronas EON Racing Team | Proton | Wira 4WD | Y | (Malaysia) Saladin Mazlan | (Malaysia) Jagdev Singh | 11 |

== Results and standings ==
=== Rally results ===
| Rd. | Rally | Overall winners | Group N Cup Winners | Teams cup Winners | 2.0 L WC winners | Report |
|---|---|---|---|---|---|---|
| 1 | (Monaco) Monte Carlo | (Japan) No. 1 Marlboro Mitsubishi Ralliart | (Italy) No. 27 Team Gamma | No finishers | (Italy) No. 38 Andrea Maselli | Report |
| 1 | (Monaco) Monte Carlo | (Japan) Mitsubishi Lancer Evo VI | (Japan) Mitsubishi Carisma GT Evo V | No finishers | (France) Renault Clio Maxi | Report |
| 1 | (Monaco) Monte Carlo | (Finland) Tommi Mäkinen (Finland) Risto Mannisenmäki | (Belgium) Marc Duez (France) Philippe Dupuy | No finishers | (Italy) Andrea Maselli (Italy) Nicola Arena | Report |
| 2 | Sweden | (Japan) No. 1 Marlboro Mitsubishi Ralliart | (Japan) No. 19 Tyre Research Institute R.T. | (Poland) No. 17 Wizja TV / Turning Point RT | No. 31 Volkswagen Motorsport Sweden | Report |
| 2 | Sweden | (Japan) Mitsubishi Lancer Evo VI | (Japan) Mitsubishi Lancer Evo IV | (Japan) Subaru Impreza S5 WRC '98 | (Germany) Volkswagen Golf Kit Car | Report |
| 2 | Sweden | (Finland) Tommi Mäkinen (Finland) Risto Mannisenmäki | (Finland) Jouko Puhakka (Finland) Jakke Honkanen | (Poland) Krzysztof Hołowczyc (Belgium) Jean-Marc Fortin | (Sweden) Harry Joki (Sweden) Ingemar Karlsson | Report |
| 3 | Kenya | (United States) No. 7 Ford Motor Co | (Japan) No. 14 Mitsubishi Ralliart | (France) No. 16 F.Dor Rally Team | (Kenya) No. 24 Phineas Kimathi | Report |
| 3 | Kenya | (United States) Ford Focus WRC '99 | (Japan) Mitsubishi Carisma GT Evo V | (Japan) Subaru Impreza S5 WRC '97 | (South Korea) Hyundai Coupé Kit car | Report |
| 3 | Kenya | (United Kingdom) Colin McRae (United Kingdom) Nicky Grist | (Oman) Hamed Al-Wahaibi (New Zealand) Tony Sircombe | (France) Frédéric Dor (United Kingdom) Kevin Gormley | (Kenya) Phineas Kimathi (Kenya) Abdul Sidi | Report |
| 4 | Portugal | (United States) No. 7 Ford Motor Co | (Portugal) No. 39 Mitsubishi Galp | No. 25 Toyota Mobil Team Turkey | (South Korea) No. 31 Hyundai Motorsport | Report |
| 4 | Portugal | (United States) Ford Focus WRC '99 | (Japan) Mitsubishi Carisma GT Evo VI | (Japan) Toyota Corolla WRC | (South Korea) Hyundai Coupé Kit car Evo2 | Report |
| 4 | Portugal | (United Kingdom) Colin McRae (United Kingdom) Nicky Grist | (Portugal) Miguel Campos (Portugal) Carlos Magalhães | (Turkey) Volkan Isik (Turkey) Erkan Bodur | (United Kingdom) Alister McRae (United Kingdom) David Senior | Report |
| 5 | Spain | (France) No. 16 Citroën Sport | No. 34 Team Mitsubishi Oman | (Spain) No. 25 Valencia Terra y Mar | (Spain) No. 19 Renault Sport España | Report |
| 5 | Spain | (France) Citroën Xsara Kit Car | (Japan) Mitsubishi Lancer Evo V | (Japan) Subaru Impreza S5 WRC '98 | (France) Renault Mégane Maxi | Report |
| 5 | Spain | (France) Philippe Bugalski (France) Jean-Paul Chiaroni | (Oman) Hamed Al-Wahaibi (New Zealand) Tony Sircombe | (Spain) Luis Climent (Spain) Álex Romaní | (Spain) Oriol Gómez (Spain) Oriol Julià Pascual | Report |
| 6 | France | (France) No. 16 Citroën Sport | (Italy) No. 26 Ralliart Italia | (Spain) No. 18 Valencia Terra y Mar | (United Kingdom) No. 23 Renault Elf Dealer Rallying | Report |
| 6 | France | (France) Citroën Xsara Kit Car | (Japan) Mitsubishi Lancer Evo VI | (Japan) Subaru Impreza S5 WRC '98 | (France) Renault Mégane Maxi | Report |
| 6 | France | (France) Philippe Bugalski (France) Jean-Paul Chiaroni | (Uruguay) Gustavo Trelles (Argentina) Martin Christie | (Spain) Luis Climent (Spain) Álex Romaní | (Finland) Tapio Laukkanen (Finland) Kaj Lindström | Report |
| 7 | Argentina | (Japan) No. 6 Subaru World Rally Team | (Italy) No. 15 Ralliart Italia | (France) No. 12 F.Dor Rally Team | (Argentina) No. 61 Ricardo Bissio | Report |
| 7 | Argentina | (Japan) Subaru Impreza S5 WRC '99 | (Japan) Mitsubishi Lancer Evo VI | (Japan) Subaru Impreza S5 WRC '97 | (France) Renault 18 GTX | Report |
| 7 | Argentina | (Finland) Juha Kankkunen (Finland) Juha Repo | (Uruguay) Gustavo Trelles (Argentina) Martin Christie | (France) Frédéric Dor (United Kingdom) Kevin Gormley | (Argentina) Ricardo Bissio (Argentina) Claudio Henin | Report |
| 8 | Greece | (Japan) No. 5 Subaru World Rally Team | No. 31 Team Mitsubishi Oman | (Spain) No. 22 Valencia Terra y Mar | (South Korea) No. 27 Hyundai Motorsport | Report |
| 8 | Greece | (Japan) Subaru Impreza S5 WRC '99 | (Japan) Mitsubishi Lancer Evo V | (Japan) Subaru Impreza 555 | (South Korea) Hyundai Coupé Kit car Evo2 | Report |
| 8 | Greece | (United Kingdom) Richard Burns (United Kingdom) Robert Reid | (Oman) Hamed Al-Wahaibi (New Zealand) Tony Sircombe | (Spain) Luis Climent (Spain) Álex Romaní | (Sweden) Kenneth Eriksson (Sweden) Staffan Parmander | Report |
| 9 | New Zealand | (Japan) No. 1 Marlboro Mitsubishi Ralliart | (Italy) No. 14 Ralliart Italia | No. 18 Team Mitsubishi Oman | (South Korea) No. 22 Hyundai Motorsport | Report |
| 9 | New Zealand | (Japan) Mitsubishi Lancer Evo VI | (Japan) Mitsubishi Lancer Evo V | (Japan) Mitsubishi Lancer Evo V | (South Korea) Hyundai Coupé Kit car Evo2 | Report |
| 9 | New Zealand | (Finland) Tommi Mäkinen (Finland) Risto Mannisenmäki | (Uruguay) Gustavo Trelles (Argentina) Martin Christie | (Oman) Hamed Al-Wahaibi (New Zealand) Tony Sircombe | (Sweden) Kenneth Eriksson (Sweden) Staffan Parmander | Report |
| 10 | Finland | (Japan) No. 6 Subaru World Rally Team | (Japan) No. 23 Tyre Research Institute R.T. | No. 21 Toyota Mobil Team Turkey | (United Kingdom) No. 27 Renault Elf Dealer Rallying | Report |
| 10 | Finland | (Japan) Subaru Impreza S5 WRC '99 | (Japan) Mitsubishi Lancer Evo V | (Japan) Toyota Corolla WRC | (France) Renault Mégane Maxi | Report |
| 10 | Finland | (Finland) Juha Kankkunen (Finland) Juha Repo | (Finland) Jouko Puhakka (Finland) Jakke Honkanen | (Turkey) Volkan Isik (Turkey) Erkan Bodur | (Finland) Tapio Laukkanen (Finland) Kaj Lindström | Report |
| 11 | China | (Japan) No. 4 Toyota Castrol Team | No. 21 Subaru Rally Team Japan | No. 11 Toyota Mobil Team Turkey | (South Korea) No. 26 Hyundai Motorsport | Report |
| 11 | China | (Japan) Toyota Corolla WRC | (Japan) Subaru Impreza WRX | (Japan) Toyota Corolla WRC | (South Korea) Hyundai Coupé Kit car Evo2 | Report |
| 11 | China | (France) Didier Auriol (France) Denis Giraudet | (Japan) Toshihiro Arai (United Kingdom) Roger Freeman | (Turkey) Volkan Isik (Turkey) Erkan Bodur | (United Kingdom) Alister McRae (United Kingdom) David Senior | Report |
| 12 | Italy | (Japan) No. 1 Marlboro Mitsubishi Ralliart | (Italy) No. 53 Mauro Rally Tuning | No. 30 Toyota Mobil Team Turkey | (Italy) No. 71 Treviso Rally Team | Report |
| 12 | Italy | (Japan) Mitsubishi Lancer Evo VI | (Japan) Mitsubishi Carisma GT Evo V | (Japan) Toyota Corolla WRC | (France) Renault Mégane Maxi | Report |
| 12 | Italy | (Finland) Tommi Mäkinen (Finland) Risto Mannisenmäki | (Italy) Gianluigi Galli (Italy) Guido D'Amore | (Turkey) Volkan Isik (Turkey) Erkan Bodur | (Italy) Piero Longhi (Italy) Lucio Baggio | Report |
| 13 | Australia | (Japan) No. 5 Subaru World Rally Team | No. 23 Subaru Rally Team Japan | No finishers | (South Korea) No. 30 Hyundai Motorsport | Report |
| 13 | Australia | (Japan) Subaru Impreza S5 WRC '99 | (Japan) Subaru Impreza WRX | No finishers | (South Korea) Hyundai Coupé Kit car Evo2 | Report |
| 13 | Australia | (United Kingdom) Richard Burns (United Kingdom) Robert Reid | (Japan) Toshihiro Arai (United Kingdom) Roger Freeman | No finishers | (Sweden) Kenneth Eriksson (Sweden) Staffan Parmander | Report |
| 14 | (United Kingdom) Britain | (Japan) No. 5 Subaru World Rally Team | (Peru) No. 65 Ramón Ferreyros | (Spain) No. 18 Valencia Terra y Mar | (United Kingdom) No. 25 Volkswagen Motorsport UK | Report |
| 14 | (United Kingdom) Britain | (Japan) Subaru Impreza S5 WRC '99 | (Japan) Mitsubishi Lancer Evo V | (Japan) Subaru Impreza S5 WRC '98 | (Germany) Volkswagen Golf IV Kit Car | Report |
| 14 | (United Kingdom) Britain | (United Kingdom) Richard Burns (United Kingdom) Robert Reid | (Peru) Ramón Ferreyros (Peru) Gonzalo Saenz | (Spain) Luis Climent (Spain) Álex Romaní | (United Kingdom) Mark Higgins (United Kingdom) Bryan Thomas | Report |

=== Drivers' championship ===
| Pos. | Driver | MON (Monaco) | SWE (Sweden) | KEN (Kenya) | POR (Portugal) | ESP (Spain) | FRA (France) | ARG (Argentina) | GRE (Greece) | NZL (New Zealand) | FIN (Finland) | CHN (China) | ITA (Italy) | AUS (Australia) | GBR (United Kingdom) | Pts |
|---|---|---|---|---|---|---|---|---|---|---|---|---|---|---|---|---|
| 1 | (Finland) Tommi Mäkinen | 1 | 1 | DSQ | 5 | 3 | 6^{2} | 4 | 3 | 1 | Ret^{2} | Ret | 1 | 3 | Ret | 62 |
| 2 | (United Kingdom) Richard Burns | 8 | 5 | Ret | 4 | 5 | 7 | 2 | 1 | Ret | 2 | 2 | Ret | 1 | 1 | 55 |
| 3 | (France) Didier Auriol | 3 | 4 | 2 | 3 | 2 | 5^{1} | 3 | Ret | 4 | Ret^{1} | 1 | 3 | Ret | Ret | 52 |
| 4 | (Finland) Juha Kankkunen | 2 | 6 | Ret | Ret | 6 | | 1 | Ret | 2 | 1 | 4 | 6 | Ret | 2 | 44 |
| 5 | (Spain) Carlos Sainz | Ret | 2 | 3 | 2 | Ret | 3^{3} | 5 | 2 | 6 | 3 | 3 | Ret | 2 | Ret | 44 |
| 6 | (United Kingdom) Colin McRae | DSQ | Ret | 1 | 1 | Ret | 4 | Ret | Ret | Ret | Ret | Ret | Ret | Ret | Ret | 23 |
| 7 | (France) Philippe Bugalski | Ret | | | | 1 | 1 | | | | | | Ret | | | 20 |
| 8 | (Belgium) Freddy Loix | Ret | 9 | Ret | | 4 | 8 | Ret | 4 | 8 | 10 | Ret | 4 | 4 | 5 | 14 |
| 9 | (Finland) Harri Rovanperä | 7 | 16 | 6 | Ret | 14 | 13 | Ret | Ret | Ret | 5 | 5 | 16 | 6 | 3 | 10 |
| 10 | (France) Gilles Panizzi | Ret | | | | | Ret | | | | 33 | | 2 | | 7 | 6 |
| 11 | (Spain) Jesús Puras | Ret | | | | Ret | 2 | | | | Ret | Ret | Ret | | 16 | 6 |
| 12 | (Sweden) Thomas Rådström | | 3 | | | | | 6 | Ret | Ret | Ret | Ret | | 7 | 6 | 6 |
| 13 | (Finland) Toni Gardemeister | 14 | 33 | | Ret | | | | | 3 | 6^{3} | | Ret | 16 | Ret | 6 |
| 14 | (Belgium) Bruno Thiry | 5 | 10 | Ret | 6 | 7 | Ret | | | | | | | | 4 | 6 |
| 15 | (Finland) Marcus Grönholm | | Ret | | Ret | | | | Ret | | 4 | | 8 | 5 | Ret | 5 |
| 16 | (France) François Delecour | 4 | | | | | Ret | | Ret | | 9 | | Ret | Ret | Ret | 3 |
| 17 | (Kenya) Ian Duncan | | | 4 | | | | | | | | | | | | 3 |
| 18 | (Estonia) Markko Märtin | | 8 | | Ret | | | | 5 | | Ret | | Ret | | 8 | 2 |
| 19 | (Norway) Petter Solberg | | 11 | 5 | 11 | | | | | | 12 | | 27 | | 9 | 2 |
| 20 | (New Zealand) Possum Bourne | | | | | | | | | 5 | | | | Ret | | 2 |
| 21 | (Italy) Andrea Aghini | | | | | | | | | | | | 5 | | | 2 |
| 22 | (Turkey) Volkan Işık | | | | 7 | 11 | | Ret | Ret | | 15 | 6 | 15 | | | 1 |
| 23 | (Italy) Piero Liatti | 6 | | Ret | Ret | 10 | 9 | Ret | Ret | | | Ret | Ret | | | 1 |
| 24 | (Greece) Leonídas Kyrkos | | | | | | | | 6 | | | | | | | 1 |
| Pos. | Driver | MON (Monaco) | SWE (Sweden) | KEN (Kenya) | POR (Portugal) | ESP (Spain) | FRA (France) | ARG (Argentina) | GRE (Greece) | NZL (New Zealand) | FIN (Finland) | CHN (China) | ITA (Italy) | AUS (Australia) | GBR (United Kingdom) | Pts |

Key
| Colour | Result |
|---|---|
| Gold | Winner |
| Silver | 2nd place |
| Bronze | 3rd place |
| Green | Points finish |
| Blue | Non-points finish |
| Blue | Non-classified finish (NC) |
| Purple | Did not finish (Ret) |
| Black | Excluded (EX) |
| Black | Disqualified (DSQ) |
| White | Did not start (DNS) |
| White | Cancelled (C) |
| Blank | Withdrew entry from the event (WD) |

=== Manufacturers' championship ===
| Pos. | Manufacturer | No. | MON (Monaco) | SWE (Sweden) | KEN (Kenya) | POR (Portugal) | ESP (Spain) | FRA (France) | ARG (Argentina) | GRE (Greece) | NZL (New Zealand) | FIN (Finland) | CHN (China) | ITA (Italy) | AUS (Australia) | GBR (United Kingdom) | Points |
|---|---|---|---|---|---|---|---|---|---|---|---|---|---|---|---|---|---|
| 1 | (Japan) Toyota Castrol Team | 3 | Ret | 2 | 3 | 2 | Ret | 1^{3} | 5 | 2 | 5 | 3 | 3 | Ret | 2 | Ret | 109 |
| 1 | (Japan) Toyota Castrol Team | 4 | 3 | 4 | 2 | 3 | 1 | 3^{1} | 3 | Ret | 4 | Ret^{1} | 1 | 3 | Ret | Ret | 109 |
| 2 | (Japan) Subaru World Rally Team | 5 | 6 | 5 | Ret | 4 | 4 | 5 | 2 | 1 | Ret | 2 | 2 | Ret | 1 | 1 | 105 |
| 2 | (Japan) Subaru World Rally Team | 6 | 2 | 6 | Ret | Ret | 5 | Ret | 1 | Ret | 2 | 1 | 4 | 5 | Ret | 2 | 105 |
| 3 | (Japan) Marlboro Mitsubishi Ralliart | 1 | 1 | 1 | EX | 5 | 2 | 4^{2} | 4 | 3 | 1 | Ret^{2} | Ret | 1 | 3 | Ret | 83 |
| 3 | (Japan) Marlboro Mitsubishi Ralliart | 2 | Ret | 7 | Ret | Ret | 3 | 6 | Ret | 4 | 6 | 8 | Ret | 4 | 4 | 5 | 83 |
| 4 | (United Kingdom) Ford Motor Co | 7 | EX | Ret | 1 | 1 | Ret | 2 | Ret | Ret | Ret | Ret | Ret | Ret | Ret | Ret | 37 |
| 4 | (United Kingdom) Ford Motor Co | 8 | EX | 3 | 4 | 6 | Ret | Ret | 6 | Ret | Ret | Ret | Ret | 6 | 7 | 6 | 37 |
| 5 | (Spain) SEAT Sport | 9 | 5 | 8 | 5 | Ret | 7 | 8 | Ret | Ret | Ret | 5 | 5 | 7 | 6 | 3 | 23 |
| 5 | (Spain) SEAT Sport | 10 | 4 | Ret | Ret | Ret | 6 | 7 | Ret | Ret | 3 | 6^{3} | Ret | Ret | 8 | Ret | 23 |
| 6 | (France) Peugeot Esso | 14 | | | | | | Ret | | Ret | | 7 | | Ret | Ret | Ret | 11 |
| 6 | (France) Peugeot Esso | 15 | | | | | | Ret | | Ret | | 4 | | 2 | 5 | Ret | 11 |
| 7 | (Czech Republic) Škoda Motorsport | 11 | Ret | | | Ret | Ret | | | 5 | | Ret | | Ret | | Ret | 6 |
| 7 | (Czech Republic) Škoda Motorsport | 12 | Ret | | | Ret | Ret | | | 6 | | 9 | | 8 | | 4 | 6 |
| Pos. | Manufacturer | No. | MON (Monaco) | SWE (Sweden) | KEN (Kenya) | POR (Portugal) | ESP (Spain) | FRA (France) | ARG (Argentina) | GRE (Greece) | NZL (New Zealand) | FIN (Finland) | CHN (China) | ITA (Italy) | AUS (Australia) | GBR (United Kingdom) | Points |

Key
| Colour | Result |
|---|---|
| Gold | Winner |
| Silver | 2nd place |
| Bronze | 3rd place |
| Green | Points finish |
| Blue | Non-points finish |
| Blue | Non-classified finish (NC) |
| Purple | Did not finish (Ret) |
| Black | Excluded (EX) |
| Black | Disqualified (DSQ) |
| White | Did not start (DNS) |
| White | Cancelled (C) |
| Blank | Withdrew entry from the event (WD) |

Notes:
^{1 2 3} – Indicate position on TV Covered Stage

=== FIA Teams' Cup ===
| Pos. | Driver | MON (Monaco) | SWE (Sweden) | KEN (Kenya) | POR (Portugal) | ESP (Spain) | FRA (France) | ARG (Argentina) | GRE (Greece) | NZL (New Zealand) | FIN (Finland) | CHN (China) | ITA (Italy) | AUS (Australia) | GBR (United Kingdom) | Pts |
|---|---|---|---|---|---|---|---|---|---|---|---|---|---|---|---|---|
| 1 | (Spain) Luís Clíment | Ret | 2 | 2 | 2 | 1 | 1 | | 1 | | Ret | | Ret | | 1 | 58 |
| 2 | (Turkey) Volkan Işık | | | | 1 | 2 | | Ret | Ret | | 1 | 1 | 1 | | | 46 |
| 3 | (France) Frédéric Dor | | | 1 | 3 | | | 1 | 3 | 2 | 2 | | | Ret | | 40 |
| 4 | (Oman) Hamed Al-Wahaibi | | | | Ret | 4 | 2 | Ret | 4 | 1 | Ret | Ret | 3 | Ret | | 28 |
| 5 | (Saudi Arabia) Abdullah Bakhashab | | | | Ret | 3 | Ret | | 2 | | | Ret | 2 | | Ret | 16 |
| NC | (Poland) Krzysztof Hołowczyc | | 1 | | Ret | | | | | | | | | | 2 | 16 |
| NC | (Australia) Michael Guest | | | | Ret | 5 | | | Ret | Ret | | 2 | | Ret | | 8 |
| Pos. | Driver | MON (Monaco) | SWE (Sweden) | KEN (Kenya) | POR (Portugal) | ESP (Spain) | FRA (France) | ARG (Argentina) | GRE (Greece) | NZL (New Zealand) | FIN (Finland) | CHN (China) | ITA (Italy) | AUS (Australia) | GBR (United Kingdom) | Pts |

=== Production World Rally Championship ===
| Pos. | Driver | MON (Monaco) | SWE (Sweden) | KEN (Kenya) | POR (Portugal) | ESP (Spain) | FRA (France) | ARG (Argentina) | GRE (Greece) | NZL (New Zealand) | FIN (Finland) | CHN (China) | ITA (Italy) | AUS (Australia) | GBR (United Kingdom) | Pts |
|---|---|---|---|---|---|---|---|---|---|---|---|---|---|---|---|---|
| 1 | (Uruguay) Gustavo Trelles | 2 | 6 | | 2 | 3 | 1 | 1 | Ret | 1 | Ret | 2 | Ret | Ret | | 69 |
| 2 | (Oman) Hamed Al-Wahaibi | | 9 | 1 | Ret | 1 | 3 | Ret | 1 | 2 | Ret | Ret | 6 | Ret | | 53 |
| 3 | (Japan) Toshihiro Arai | | | | | | | | | 4 | | 1 | | 1 | | 29 |
| 4 | (Austria) Manfred Stohl | Ret | 4 | 4 | Ret | Ret | 2 | Ret | Ret | | 3 | | 2 | | Ret | 27 |
| 5 | (Finland) Jouko Puhakka | | 1 | | Ret | Ret | Ret | | | | 1 | | | | | 26 |
| 6 | (Peru) Ramón Ferreyros | | | | 4 | | | | 2 | | | Ret | | | 1 | 24 |
| 7 | (Italy) Gianluigi Galli | | 7 | | Ret | Ret | Ret | | | | 6 | | 1 | | | 24 |
| 8 | (Belgium) Marc Duez | 1 | | | | | | | | | | | | | | 13 |
| 9 | (Portugal) Miguel Campos | | | | 1 | | | | | | | | | | | 13 |
| 10 | (Finland) Jani Paasonen | | 3 | | | | | | | | 2 | | | | | 13 |
| 11 | (Japan) Katsuhiko Taguchi | | | | | | | | | 3 | | 3 | | 4 | | 13 |
| 12 | (Sweden) Stig-Olov Walfridson | | 2 | | | | | | | | | | | | | 8 |
| 13 | (Spain) Luis Climent | Ret | 8 | 2 | | | | | | | | | | | | 8 |
| 14 | (Italy) Giovanni Manfrinato | | | | | 2 | | | | | | | | | | 8 |
| 15 | (Argentina) Jorge Recalde | | | | | | | 2 | | | | | | | | 8 |
| 16 | (Australia) Ed Ordynski | | | | | | | | | | | | | 2 | | 8 |
| 17 | (United Kingdom) Richard Tuthill | | | | | | | | | | | | | | 2 | 8 |
| 18 | (Monaco) Christophe Spiliotis | 3 | | | | | | | | | | | | | | 5 |
| 19 | (Japan) Hideaki Miyoshi | | | 3 | | | | | | | | | | | | 5 |
| 20 | (Finland) Juha Kangas | | Ret | | 3 | 8 | | | Ret | | Ret | | | | | 5 |
| 21 | (Argentina) Claudio Menzi | | | | | | | 3 | | | | | | | | 5 |
| 22 | (Belgium) Gaby Goudezeune | | | | | | | | 3 | | | | | | | 5 |
| 23 | (Italy) Mario Stagni | | | | | | | | | | | | 3 | | | 5 |
| 24 | (Germany) Uwe Nittel | | | | | | | | | | | | | 3 | | 5 |
| 21 | (United Kingdom) Gavin Cox | | | | | | | | | | | | | | 3 | 5 |
| Pos. | Driver | MON (Monaco) | SWE (Sweden) | KEN (Kenya) | POR (Portugal) | ESP (Spain) | FRA (France) | ARG (Argentina) | GRE (Greece) | NZL (New Zealand) | FIN (Finland) | CHN (China) | ITA (Italy) | AUS (Australia) | GBR (United Kingdom) | Pts |

=== FIA 2 Litre World Cup for Manufacturers ===
() Denotes dropped score.

| Pos | Entrant | R1 | R2 | R3 | R4 | R5 | R6 | R7 | R8 | R9 | R10 | R11 | R12 | R13 | R14 | Pts |
|---|---|---|---|---|---|---|---|---|---|---|---|---|---|---|---|---|
| 1 | Renault | 16 | (3) | 0 | (7) | 10 | 16 | 10 | 10 | (4) | 16 | 0 | 16 | 8 | (6) | 102 |
| 2 | Hyundai | 0 | 0 | 10 | 16 | 0 | 0 | 0 | 13 | 16 | 4 | 16 | 0 | 13 | 7 | 95 |
| NC(*) | Volkswagen | 0 | 16 | 0 | 0 | 0 | 0 | 0 | 0 | 0 | 5 | 0 | 4 | 0 | 0 | 25 |

(*) – Volkswagen were not classified for not homologating their Golf Kit Car at the start of the season.

== Events ==
| Rally Name | Start-End Date | Podium Drivers (Finishing Time) | Podium Cars |
|---|---|---|---|
| (Monaco) Monte Carlo Rally (asphalt & snow) | 17 January–20 January | 1. (Finland) Tommi Mäkinen (5h:16m:50.6s); 2. (Finland) Juha Kankkunen (5h:18m:35.3s); 3. (France) Didier Auriol (5h:20m:43.4s) | 1. Mitsubishi Lancer Evo 6; 2. Subaru Impreza WRC; 3. Toyota Corolla WRC |
| (Sweden) Swedish Rally (snow) | 12 February–14 February | 1. (Finland) Tommi Mäkinen (3h:29m:15.6s); 2. (Spain) Carlos Sainz (3h:29m:33.7s); 3. (Sweden) Thomas Rådström (3h:29m:53.4s) | 1. Mitsubishi Lancer Evo 6; 2. Toyota Corolla WRC; 3. Ford Focus WRC |
| (Kenya) Safari Rally (gravel) | 26 February–28 February | 1. (United Kingdom) Colin McRae (8h:41m:39s); 2. (France) Didier Auriol (8h:56m:05s); 3. (Spain) Carlos Sainz (8h:59m:46s) | 1. Ford Focus WRC; 2. Toyota Corolla WRC; 3. Toyota Corolla WRC |
| Rally Portugal (gravel) | 21 March–24 March | 1. (United Kingdom) Colin McRae (4h:05m:41.7s); 2. (Spain) Carlos Sainz (4h:05m:54.0s); 3. (France) Didier Auriol (4h:05m:58.2s) | 1. Ford Focus WRC; 2. Toyota Corolla WRC; 3. Toyota Corolla WRC |
| (Spain) Rally Catalunya (asphalt) | 19 April–21 April | 1. (France) Philippe Bugalski (4h:13m:45.6s); 2. (France) Didier Auriol (4h:14m:17.4s); 3. (Finland) Tommi Mäkinen (4h:16m:06.7s) | 1. Citroën Xsara Kit Car; 2. Toyota Corolla WRC; 3. Mitsubishi Lancer Evo 6 |
| (France) Tour de Corse (asphalt) | 7 May–9 May | 1. (France) Philippe Bugalski (3h:44m:35.7s); 2. (Spain) Jesús Puras (3h:45m:10.4s); 3. (Spain) Carlos Sainz (3h:45m:45.0s) | 1. Citroën Xsara Kit Car; 2. Citroën Xsara Kit Car; 3. Toyota Corolla WRC |
| Rally Argentina (gravel) | 22 May–25 May | 1. (Finland) Juha Kankkunen (4h:17m:15.4s); 2. (United Kingdom) Richard Burns (4h:17m:17.8s); 3. (France) Didier Auriol (4h:17m:55.0s) | 1. Subaru Impreza WRC; 2. Subaru Impreza WRC; 3. Toyota Corolla WRC |
| (Greece) Acropolis Rally (gravel) | 6 June–9 June | 1. (United Kingdom) Richard Burns (4h:21m:21.2s); 2. (Spain) Carlos Sainz (4h:22m:22.5s); 3. (Finland) Tommi Mäkinen (4h:24m:01.2s) | 1. Subaru Impreza WRC; 2. Toyota Corolla WRC; 3. Mitsubishi Lancer Evo 6 |
| Rally New Zealand (gravel) | 15 July–18 July | 1. (Finland) Tommi Mäkinen (4h:11m:07.1s); 2. (Finland) Juha Kankkunen (4h:12m:44.1s); 3. (Finland) Toni Gardemeister (4h:13m:56.1s) | 1. Mitsubishi Lancer Evo 6; 2. Subaru Impreza WRC; 3. SEAT Córdoba WRC |
| Rally Finland (gravel) | 20 August–22 August | 1. (Finland) Juha Kankkunen (3h:08m:54.5s); 2. (United Kingdom) Richard Burns (3h:09m:04.2s); 3. (Spain) Carlos Sainz (3h:09m:12.5s) | 1. Subaru Impreza WRC; 2. Subaru Impreza WRC; 3. Toyota Corolla WRC |
| Rally China (gravel) | 17 September–19 September | 1. (France) Didier Auriol (3h:38m:36.6s); 2. (United Kingdom) Richard Burns (3h:39m:32.4s); 3. (Spain) Carlos Sainz (3h:40m:56.0s) | 1. Toyota Corolla WRC; 2. Subaru Impreza WRC; 3. Toyota Corolla WRC |
| (Italy) Rally Sanremo (asphalt) | 11 October–13 October | 1. (Finland) Tommi Mäkinen (4h:26m:45.0s); 2. (France) Gilles Panizzi (4h:27m:03.0s); 3. (France) Didier Auriol (4h:27m:27.2s) | 1. Mitsubishi Lancer Evo 6; 2. Peugeot 206 WRC; 3. Toyota Corolla WRC |
| Rally Australia (gravel) | 4 November–7 November | 1. (United Kingdom) Richard Burns (3h:44m:31.5s); 2. (Spain) Carlos Sainz (3h:44m:43.1s); 3. (Finland) Tommi Mäkinen (3h:49m:02.9s) | 1. Subaru Impreza WRC; 2. Toyota Corolla WRC; 3. Mitsubishi Lancer Evo 6 |
| (United Kingdom) Rally of Great Britain (asphalt & gravel) | 23 November–26 November | 1. (United Kingdom) Richard Burns (3h:53m:44.2s); 2. (Finland) Juha Kankkunen (3h:55m:31.5s); 3. (Finland) Harri Rovanperä (3h:58m:39.5s) | 1. Subaru Impreza WRC; 2. Subaru Impreza WRC; 3. SEAT Córdoba WRC E2 |
