= Fulston Manor School =

Location
- Brenchley Road; Sittingbourne, Kent, ME10 4EG; England
- Coordinates: 51.3329°N 0.7368°E

Information
- Type: Academy
- Motto: Everybody matters, everybody succeeds, everybody helps
- Local authority: Kent
- Trust: Fulston Manor Academies Trust
- Department for Education URN: 136324 Tables
- Ofsted: Reports
- Head teacher: Susie Burden
- Gender: Mixed
- Age: 11 to 18
- Enrolment: 1352
- Capacity: 1104
- Houses: Morrison, Cromer, Stanhope, Hales
- Website: www.fulstonmanor.kent.sch.uk

Fulston Manor School is a secondary School with academy status in Sittingbourne, Kent. The head teacher is Mrs Susie Burden . It teaches years 7–13 (11- to 18-year-olds).

== Description ==
Fulston Manor School is a larger-than-average secondary school. It is a non-selective school in a local authority where high numbers of schools select pupils by ability. The school forms part of the Fulston Manor Academies Trust (FMAT) with South Avenue Primary School.

The previous headteacher, Alan Brookes was a national leader of education. The vast majority of pupils are of White British heritage. About a quarter of pupils in the school are eligible for support from the pupil premium (additional government funding), which is broadly in line with the national average while The proportion of pupils who have special educational needs and/or disabilities is below average. The school meets the Department for Education's definition of a coasting school based on key stage 4 academic performance results in 2015 and 2016.

== Organisation ==
As of 2014, the lower school has an annual intake of 210 students at the beginning of Year Seven (age 11).

The school uses a vertical house system rather than traditional year/age based groups where every student is assigned to one of the four houses: Cromer (blue), Hales (red), Stanhope (yellow) and Morrison (green).

The school uniform consists of a black blazer accompanied with the school badge on the breast pocket, with grey trousers and a white shirt. Socks may either be black or grey. Shirts must be worn with a tie, which varies according to the house in which the student is placed. Girls may also wear a scarlet v-neck jumper to accompany the blazer.

== Academics ==
This is non-selective mixed school in an area with single sex grammar schools. Virtually all maintained schools and academies follow the National Curriculum, and are inspected by Ofsted on how well they succeed in delivering a 'broad and balanced curriculum'. Schools endeavour to get all students to achieve the English Baccalaureate (EBACC) qualification- this must include core subjects, a modern or ancient foreign language, and either History or Geography.

=== Curriculum intent ===
With those constrains the curriculum aims to provide a framework which translates the values of the school into high-quality teaching so that all students of all abilities to reach their full potential. This includes those identified as having special educational needs. It is not solely about the National Curriculum but embraces informal leaning and the co-curriculum.

The published aim of the curriculum is to help students to:

- Acquire appropriate knowledge, understanding and skills
- Develop creative, imaginative, enquiring minds with a willingness to take risks
- Acquire skills relevant to adult life and the current dynamic technological world
- Encourage high aspirations
- Develop high standards of literacy and numeracy to ensure equality of access and successful progression within and beyond education
- Develop and use enterprise capabilities in a variety of contexts

=== KS3 ===
The curriculum at Key Stage 3 builds upon the National Curriculum at Key Stage 2 to ensure that students are fully prepared for Key Stage 4. Students study a range of subjects:

Art, Citizenship Design Technology, Drama, English, Food Technology, French, Geography, History, Information Technology (Computing Science), Mathematics, Music, Physical Education, Religious Education, Science and Textiles.

Key Stage 3 is taught in Years 7–9. Core subjects (English, Mathematics and Science) may begin the GCSE program of study earlier, in Year 9.

=== KS4 ===
Students are encouraged to follow a broad and balanced programme of study which fulfils the requirements of the National Curriculum. The rigorous curriculum includes Core Subjects, Baccalaureate Subjects and a broad range of other academic and creative subjects.

Religious Education, Careers Advice and Guidance, Citizenship and Health education (including sex education) are all accommodated within PSHE and Games

- Compulsory subjects: Mathematics, English Literature and English Language, Science where it is required to study either Combined Science (to achieve 2 GCSEs) or Biology, Chemistry and Physics (to achieve 3 GCSEs).
- Baccalaureate Subjects – Combined Science, Biology, Chemistry, Physics, Computer Science, Geography, History and French
- Optional subjects – may vary from year to year in response to the needs and interests of the students. in a typical year these include: Art and Design, Business Studies, Business Communication, Computer Science, Catering, Citizenship, Dance, Drama, Economics, French, Graphic Products, Geography, Health and Social Care (both single and double award), History, Media Studies, Music, Personal Finance, Physical Education, Product Design, Religious Education, Textiles, Triple Science (Biology, Chemistry and Physics).

All students in Key Stage 4 have Independent Study Periods incorporated into their timetable which are supervised by staff who support students to develop effective study skills. Games is compulsory for all students.

=== KS5 ===
An academic sixth form is offered leading to A level examinations, the subject offer is enhanced by having a partnership and common timetabling with Borden Grammar School and Highsted Grammar School.

== Notable alumni ==
- Mark Tilbury, entrepreneur, investor and YouTuber.
