= Toyota Kenya =

Subsidiary of Toyota

- Type: Subsidiary
- Industry: Automotive
- Founded: January 2012
- Headquarters: Nairobi, Kenya
- Parent: Toyota
- Website: toyotakenya.com

Toyota Kenya Limited is a wholly owned subsidiary of Toyota based in Nairobi, Kenya. The company was founded in January 2012 as a successor to Toyota East Africa Limited. It is the importer and distributor of Toyota, Yamaha, Hino and Suzuki vehicles to Kenya.

== History ==
The Toyota East Africa Limited had vehicles manufactured by the Associated Vehicle Assemblers since 1977. The assembled vehicles included the Toyota Land Cruiser and the Toyota Hilux.

In January 2012, the company was replaced by Toyota Kenya Limited.

In 2013, assembly of Hino trucks started at Associated Vehicle Assemblers. To this end, Toyota had invested KSh. 500 million (around €5 million).
