= Mark Tilbury =

British entrepreneur, investor and influencer (born 1967)

- Born: September 15, 1967 (age 59); Canterbury, Kent, United Kingdom.
- Education: Fulston Manor School
- Occupations: Entrepreneur; investor; YouTuber
- Years active: 2014–present
- Spouse: Kristen Tilbury

YouTube information
- Channel: Mark Tilbury
- Website: www.marktilbury.com

Mark Stephen Tilbury (born September 15, 1967) is a British entrepreneur, investor, podcaster and content creator at YouTube and Instagram. His net worth as of 2026 is around $9 million dollars. His primary residence is in Monaco. He is the founder and CEO of two companies. On his YouTube channel, he offers advice and on guides on investments, making money and handling business. His channels on YouTube, TikTok and Instagram have combined followers of more than 18 million.

== Career ==
Mark Tilbury was born in Canterbury, United Kingdom. He has three sisters. He attended Fulston Manor School but dropped out of school at the age of 16. After moving between several entry-level jobs, he entered into business. He became a millionaire while in his twenties.

In 2003 Tilbury started the company Model World Ltd., based in Sittingbourne. Model World sells remote-controlled toys. He Resigned as a Director in March 2026.

After his toy business continued to grow, Mark Tilbury opened a second company, Century UK Limited, which specializes in electronic equipment. This business was Dissolved and struck off in January 2026. On March 15, 2014, he opened his YouTube channel, and in 2020, he opened a TikTok account. As of February 2023, Tilbury remains as the CEO of both companies. In 2020, he started Mark Tilbury Coaching Ltd. which offers business and investment advice.

== Personal life ==
Tilbury is married to Kristen Tilbury. They have three children. He has a son, Curtis, with whom he hosts the podcast Like Father, Like Son?
