= David Senior =

British rally co-driver (born 1964)

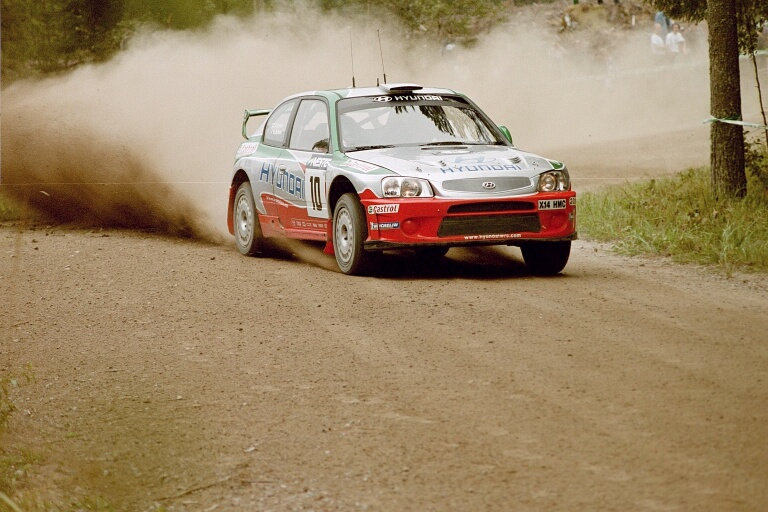
- Senior and Alister McRae competing at the 2001 Rally Finland

Personal information
- Nationality: (United Kingdom) British
- Born: 31 March 1964 (age 62); Barnsley, West Yorkshire, England

World Rally Championship record
- Years active: 1986, 1990–1994, 1996–2009
- Driver: (United Kingdom) David Young (United Kingdom) Jimmy McRae (United Kingdom) Alister McRae (United Kingdom) Kris Meeke (Oman) Hamed Al-Wahaibi (Zimbabwe) Conrad Rautenbach (Australia) Tolley Challis (United Kingdom) Phillip Morrow (India) Gaurav Gill
- Teams: Ford, Subaru, Nissan, Hyundai, Mitsubishi
- Rallies: 117
- Rally wins: 0
- Podiums: 0
- Stage wins: 6
- First rally: 1986 RAC Rally
- Last rally: 2009 Rally of Great Britain

David Senior (born 31 March 1964) is a British former rally co-driver. He competed at 116 WRC rallies. He was the winner of the British Rally Championship in 1995.

== Career ==
Senior's rally career began in 1980 while rallying in local road rallies. He connected with David Young in a Mk II Ford escort and in 1986 the two joined the British Junior Rally Team. Senior met Alister McRae while co-driving for Andy Knight in 1988 and began a partnership with him in 1989 which lasted for 15 years. In 1992, they won the inaugural Shell Scholarship Competition and the British Group N title where many other winning groups participated. They also became the first crew to win a round of the National Rally Championship outright in a Group N car during the Granite City Rally.

Senior's first full-time contract came in 1993 when he signed for the Prodrive Junior Team, along with Alister and his teammates, Richard Burns and Robert Reid.

Senior joined Nissan team in 1994 and after teething problems with the car during that season, he went on to win the British Rally Championship in 1995.

1996 only brought a few one off outings in various cars, but in 1997, the pair signed for VW to do the BRC and selected World events. In a famous showdown in the Isle of Man, they looked on course to be heading for a second BRC title when suspension failure catapulted them into a spectacular roll in the yellow Sony VW Golf.

During 1998, they were approached by Hyundai who were building their first Formula Two car and would progress with a full WRC in 2000. On Rally New Zealand in 2000, Alister and David scored Hyundai's fastest time ever on the Te Akao south stage. In Portugal in 2001, they scored the first manufacturers point for Hyundai and the season ended with a fourth place overall on Rally GB.

In 2002, they signed for Mitsubishi Ralliart on a two-year deal. However, Mitsubishi's first WRC car was never truly competitive and their best result was fifth in Sweden. In September, Alister suffered a mountain bike accident and they missed the rest of the season. In December 2002, Mitsubishi announced they were pulling out of competition in 2003 to test and develop the new car. In 2003, whilst developing the car, they gained a sixth place finish on Rally New Zealand.
