= Toyota Corolla WRC =

Toyota World Rally Car

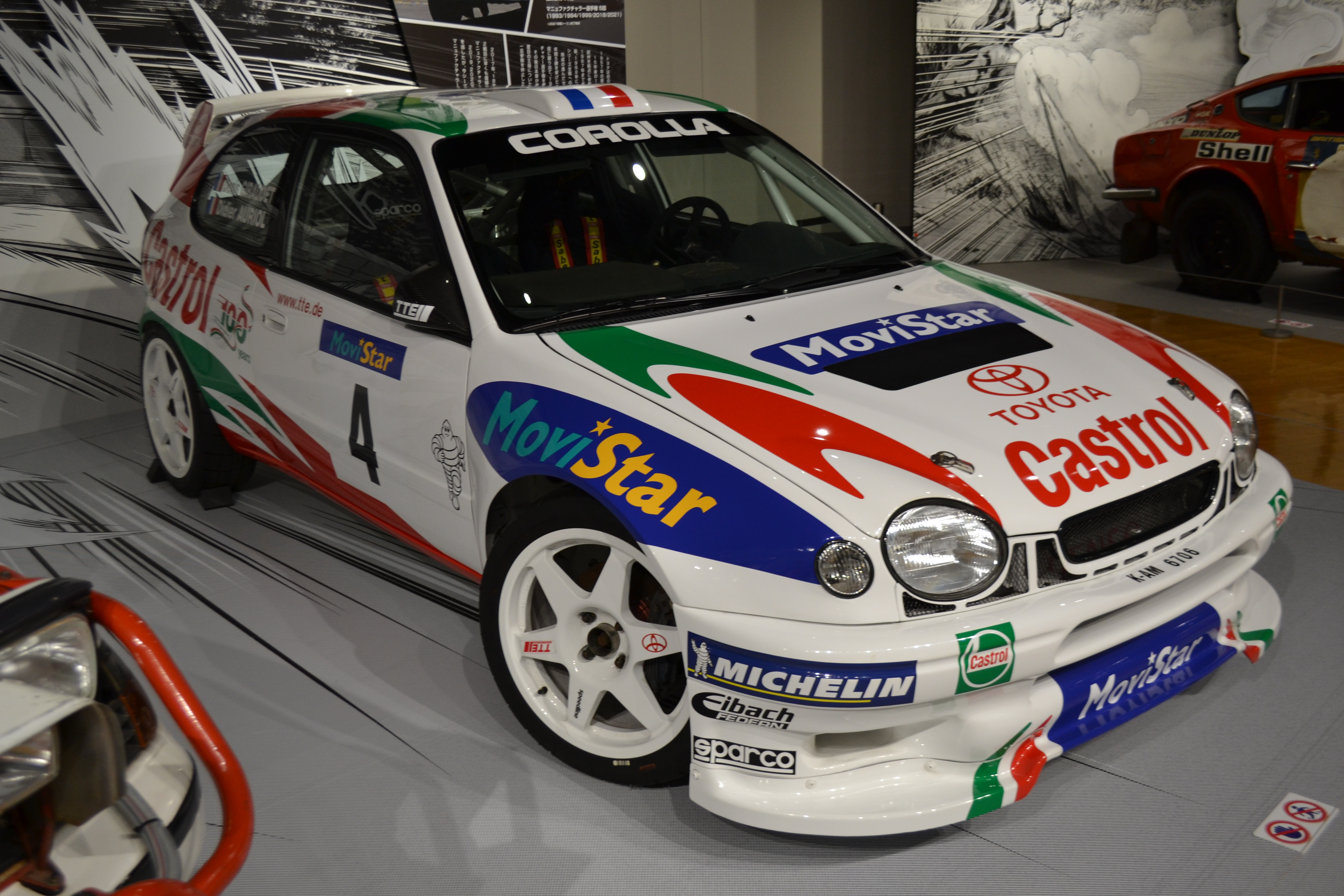
- Didier Auriol's Corolla WRC
- Category: World Rally Car
- Constructor: Toyota Motorsport GmbH
- Designer: Dagobert Röhrer
- Predecessor: Toyota Celica GT-Four
- Successor: Toyota Yaris WRC

Technical specifications
- Length: 4,100 mm (161.4 in)
- Width: 1,770 mm (69.7 in)
- Height: 1,365 mm (53.7 in)
- Axle track: 1,564 mm (61.6 in) (front); 1,556 mm (61.3 in) (rear)
- Wheelbase: 2,465 mm (97.0 in)
- Engine: Toyota 3S-GTE 1,998 cc (122 cu in) I4 turbocharged front-engine, all-wheel-drive
- Transmission: Six-speed sequential
- Weight: 1,230 kg (2,711.7 lb)
- Tyres: Michelin

Competition history (WRC)
- Notable entrants: (Japan) Toyota Castrol Team
- Notable drivers: (France) Didier Auriol; (Australia) Neal Bates; (Italy) Valentino Rossi; (France) Sébastien Loeb; (Kenya) Ian Duncan; (Finland) Marcus Grönholm; (Belgium) Freddy Loix; (Sweden) Thomas Rådström; (Spain) Carlos Sainz
- Debut: 1997 Rally Finland
- First win: (Monaco) 1998 Monte Carlo Rally
- Last win: 1999 Rally China
Races	Wins	Podiums	Titles
32	4	30	1
- Constructors' Championships: 1 (1999)

The Toyota Corolla WRC is a World Rally Car built for the Toyota Castrol Team by Toyota Motorsport GmbH to compete in the World Rally Championship. It is based upon the E110 version of Toyota Corolla road car. The car debuted at the 1997 Rally Finland, and replaced the Toyota Celica Turbo ST205. It won a total of four rally victories and the 1999 World Manufacturers' title.

== Competition history ==
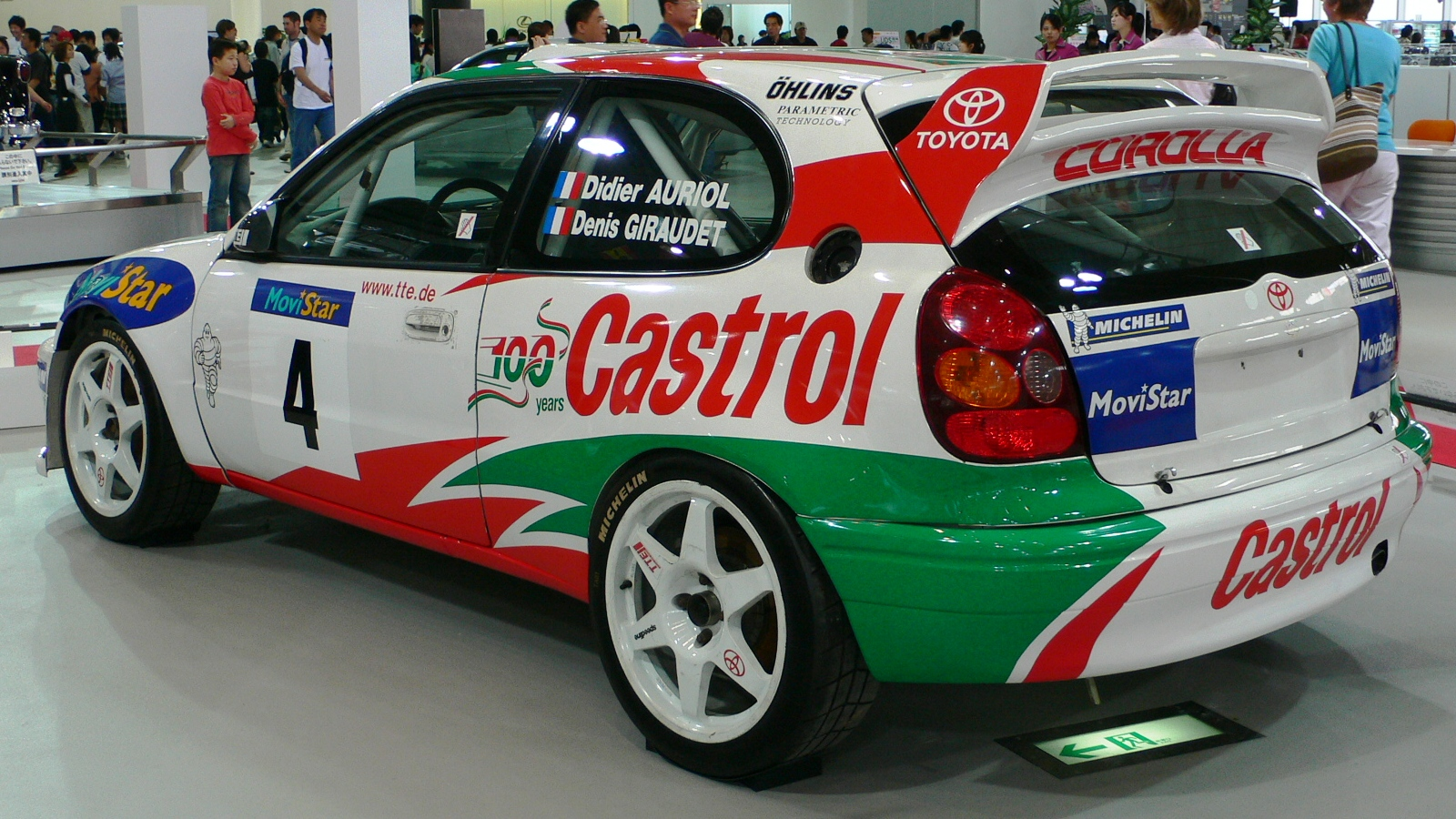
Rear view of Toyota Corolla WRC

The Toyota Corolla WRC (World Rally Car) is special purpose rally car based on the European Corolla 3 door Hatchback (E110), and powered by a modified 3S-GTE engine with water-cooled turbo system producing 223 kW (299 hp) and 4WD system that was sourced from the Toyota Celica GT-Four ST205.

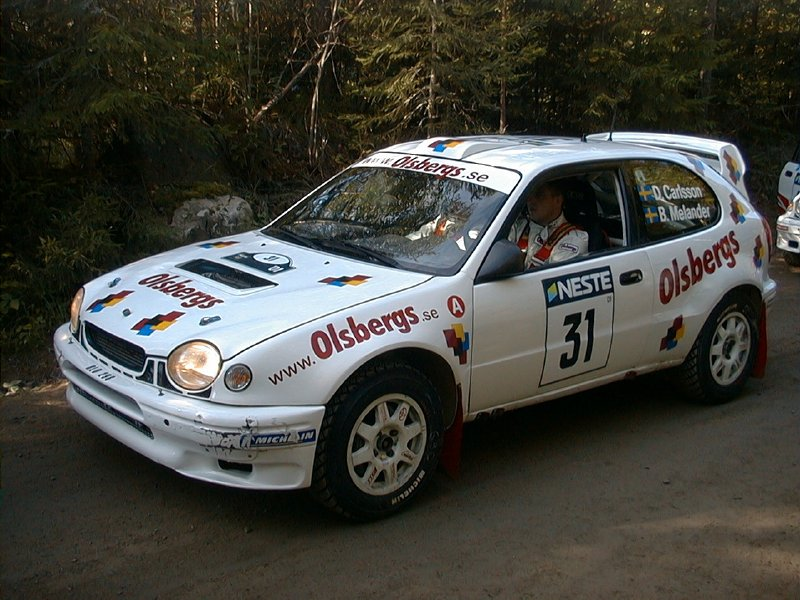
Toyota Corolla WRC in the 2001 Neste Rally of Finland

It was launched in July 1997, and made its debut at the 1997 Rally Finland with Didier Auriol and Marcus Grönholm behind the wheel.

For 1998 WRC season, double World Rally Champions Carlos Sainz and Luis Moya joined the Toyota Team Europe, and won the 1998 Monte Carlo Rally. It was the first victory for the Corolla WRC. Didier Auriol won the 1999 China Rally, and Toyota won the 1999 manufacturer's title while the company stopped participating in rallying, in order to prepare for a switch to Formula One in 2002.

== World Rally Championship results ==
=== Championship titles ===
Year	Title	Competitor	Entries	Wins	Podiums	Points
1999	FIA World Rally Championship for Manufacturers	(Japan) Toyota Castrol Team	30	1	15	109

=== WRC victories ===
No.	Event	Season	Driver	Co-driver
1	(Monaco) 1998 Monte Carlo Rally	1998	(Spain) Carlos Sainz	(Spain) Luis Moya
2	(Spain) 1998 Rallye Catalunya	1998	(France) Didier Auriol	(France) Denis Giraudet
3	1998 Rally New Zealand	1998	(Spain) Carlos Sainz	(Spain) Luis Moya
4	1999 China Rally	1999	(France) Didier Auriol	(France) Denis Giraudet

Awards
Preceded by Mitsubishi Lancer Evo V	Autosport; Rally Car of the Year; 1999	Succeeded by Ford Focus RS WRC
