= Hamed Al-Wahaibi =

Omani rally driver (born 1968)

Personal information
- Nationality: (Oman) Omani
- Born: 20 January 1968 (age 58); Muscat, Oman

World Rally Championship record
- Years active: 1997—2005, 2022—present
- Co-driver: (United Kingdom) Terry Harryman (New Zealand) Tony Sircombe (United Kingdom) Michael Orr (United Kingdom) Nicky Beech (United Kingdom) David Senior (Austria) Ilka Minor
- Teams: Privateer
- Rallies: 42
- Championships: 0
- Rally wins: 0
- Podiums: 0
- Stage wins: 0
- Total points: 0
- First rally: 1997 Network Q RAC Rally
- Last rally: 2022 Acropolis Rally

Hamed Al-Wahaibi (Arabic: حمد الوهيبي; born 20 January 1968 in Muscat) is an Omani rally driver and a former WRC driver. He is the first WRC competitor from Oman.

== Rally Career ==
In 1999, Al Wahaibi set a new record after his participation in the Finland Rally, becoming the first Arab driver to have 30 World Rally Championships to his credit.

By the end of 1999, Al Wahaibi was considered to be the first Arab driver to lead the group N World Rally Championship. He eventually finished the season in second place, the highest finish ever by an Arab driver.

In 2001, Al Wahaibi won the Rallye Terre D'Auvergene, the second round of the French Gravel Rally Championship, and became the first Arab and possibly non-European rallyist to have won the French event.
