= Olivier Burri =

Swiss rally driver (born 1963)

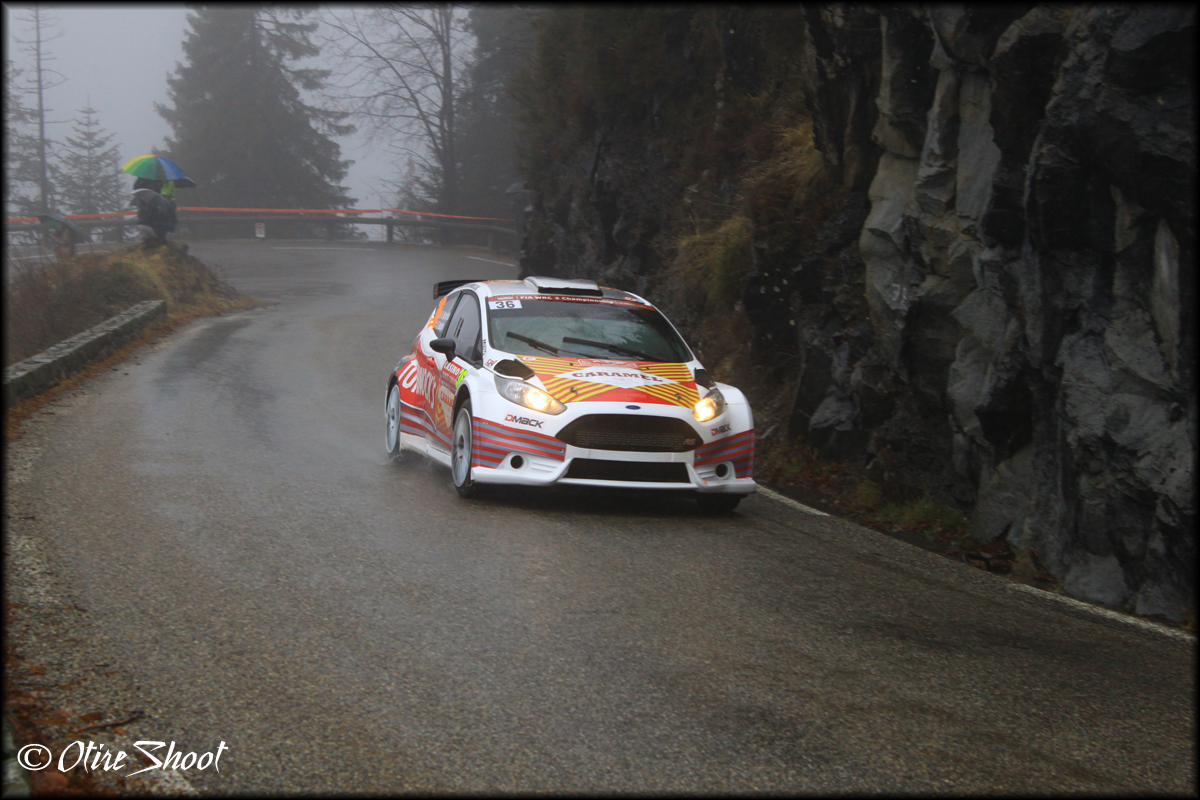

Personal information
- Nationality: (Switzerland) Swiss
- Born: 9 April 1963 (age 63); Hazebrouck, France

World Rally Championship record
- Years active: 1991, 1993, 1997, 2000–2004, 2006–2008, 2012–2015, 2017–present
- Co-driver: (Switzerland) Christophe Hofmann (Switzerland) Jean-Philippe Patthey (France) Fabrice Gordon (France) Jean-Jacques Ferrero (France) Guillaume Duval (Switzerland) Stéphane Rey (France) Anderson Levratti
- Teams: Private
- Rallies: 27
- Championships: 0
- Rally wins: 0
- Podiums: 0
- Stage wins: 0
- Total points: 7
- First rally: 1991 Monte Carlo Rally
- Last rally: 2025 Monte Carlo Rally

Olivier Burri (born 4 September 1963) is a Swiss rally driver who has competed in the World Rally Championship since 1991. He competed at the Monte Carlo Rally more than 20 times. He is a four-time Swiss Rally Champion and had nine victories at the Rallye International du Valais.

== Biography ==
=== Career in Rally ===
Burri's professional rallying début was at the 1991 Monte Carlo Rally driving a Ford Sierra RS Cosworth. 1991 also saw his début in the European Rally Championship which he has had modest success in. He has entered in eighteen ERC rounds, winning six of them. He has also competed in the Rallye International du Valais, a Swiss-based rally that is also a part of the ERC, which he has won numerous times. During the Monte Carlo Rally's time as part of the Intercontinental Rally Challenge, it has not stopped Burri from competing regularly at the infamous rally, finishing seventh overall in 2009.

== Results ==
=== Complete WRC results ===
Year	Entrant	Car	1	2	3	4	5	6	7	8	9	10	11	12	13	14	15	16	Pos.	Pts
1991	Olivier Burri	Ford Sierra RS Cosworth 4x4	MON; 23	SWE	POR	KEN	FRA	GRE	NZL	ARG	FIN	AUS	ITA	CIV	ESP	GBR			NC	0
1993	Olivier Burri	Ford Escort RS Cosworth	MON; 7	SWE	POR	KEN	FRA	GRE	ARG	NZL	FIN	AUS	ITA	ESP	GBR				38th	4
1997	Olivier Burri	Subaru Impreza 555	MON; 7	SWE	KEN	POR	ESP	FRA	ARG	GRE	NZL	FIN	IDN	ITA	AUS	GBR			NC	0
2000	Olivier Burri	Toyota Corolla WRC	MON; 8	SWE	KEN	POR	ESP	ARG	GRE	NZL	FIN	CYP	FRA; Ret	ITA	AUS	GBR			NC	0
2001	Olivier Burri	Toyota Corolla WRC	MON; Ret	SWE	POR	ESP	ARG	CYP	GRE	KEN	FIN	NZL	ITA	FRA	AUS	GBR			NC	0
2002	Olivier Burri	Peugeot 206 WRC	MON; Ret	SWE	FRA	ESP	CYP	ARG	GRE	KEN	FIN	GER	ITA	NZL	AUS	GBR			NC	0
2003	Olivier Burri	Toyota Corolla WRC	MON; 12	SWE	TUR	NZL	ARG	GRC	CYP	GER	FIN	AUS	ITA	FRA	ESP	GBR			NC	0
2004	Olivier Burri	Subaru Impreza WRC 03	MON; 8	SWE	MEX	NZL	CYP	GRE	TUR	ARG	FIN	GER	JPN	GBR	ITA	FRA	ESP		31st	1
2006	Olivier Burri	Peugeot 307 WRC	MON; 12	SWE	MEX	ESP	FRA	ARG	ITA	GRE	GER	FIN	JPN	CYP	TUR	AUS	NZL	GBR	NC	0
2007	Olivier Burri	Subaru Impreza WRX STi	MON; 17	SWE	NOR	MEX	POR	ARG	ITA	GRE	FIN	GER	NZL	ESP	FRA	JPN	IRE	GBR	NC	0
2008	Olivier Burri	Subaru Impreza WRX STi	MON; 18	SWE	MEX	ARG	JOR	ITA	GRE	TUR	FIN	GER	NZL	ESP	FRA	JPN	GBR		NC	0
2012	Olivier Burri	Mitsubishi Lancer Evo X	MON; 18	SWE	MEX	POR	ARG	GRE	NZL	FIN	GER	GBR	FRA	ITA	ESP				NC	0
2013	Olivier Burri	Peugeot 207 S2000	MON; 9	SWE	MEX	POR	ARG	GRE	ITA	FIN	GER	AUS	FRA	ESP	GBR				27th	2
2014	Olivier Burri	Ford Fiesta S2000	MON; Ret	SWE	MEX	POR	ARG	ITA	POL	FIN	GER	AUS	FRA	ESP	GBR				NC	0
2015	Olivier Burri	Ford Fiesta R5	MON; Ret	SWE	MEX	ARG	POR	ITA	POL	FIN	GER	AUS	FRA	ESP	GBR				NC	0
2017	Olivier Burri	Ford Fiesta R5	MON; 14	SWE	MEX	FRA	ARG	POR	ITA	POL	FIN	GER	ESP	GBR	AUS				NC	0
2018	Olivier Burri	Škoda Fabia R5	MON; 12	SWE	MEX	FRA	ARG	POR	ITA	FIN	GER	TUR	GBR	ESP	AUS				NC	0
2019	Olivier Burri	Škoda Fabia R5	MON; 15	SWE	MEX	FRA	ARG	CHL	POR	ITA	FIN	GER	TUR	GBR	ESP	AUS			NC	0
2020	Olivier Burri	Volkswagen Polo GTI R5	MON; 18	SWE	MEX	EST	TUR	ITA	MNZ										NC	0
2021	Olivier Burri	Volkswagen Polo GTI R5	MON; 18	ARC	CRO	POR	ITA	KEN	EST	BEL	GRE	FIN	ESP	MNZ					NC	0
2022	Olivier Burri	Volkswagen Polo GTI R5	MON; 20	SWE	CRO; 25	POR	ITA	KEN	EST	FIN									NC	0
2022	Olivier Burri	Hyundai i20 N Rally2									BEL; 29	GRE	NZL	ESP	JPN				NC	0
2023	Olivier Burri	Hyundai i20 N Rally2	MON; 59	SWE	MEX	CRO	POR	ITA	KEN	EST	FIN	GRE	CHL	EUR	JPN				NC	0
2024	Olivier Burri	Škoda Fabia Rally2 evo	MON; 16	SWE	KEN	CRO	POR	ITA	POL	LAT	FIN	GRE	CHL	EUR	JPN				NC	0
2025	Olivier Burri	Škoda Fabia Rally2 evo	MON; 24	SWE	KEN	ESP	POR	ITA	GRE	EST	FIN	PAR	CHL	EUR	JPN	SAU			NC*	0*

* Season still in progress.

=== IRC results ===
Year	Entrant	Car	1	2	3	4	5	6	7	8	9	10	11	12	WDC	Points
2008	Scuderia Solferino Rally	Fiat Abarth Grande Punto S2000	TUR	POR	BEL	RUS	POR	CZE	ESP	ITA	SWI; Ret	CHI			NC	0
2009	Olivier Burri	Fiat Abarth Grande Punto S2000	MON; 7	BRA	KEN	POR	BEL	RUS	POR	CZE	ESP	ITA	SCO		37th	2
2010	Olivier Burri	Subaru Impreza WRX STi	MON; 13	BRA	ARG	CAN	ITA	BEL	AZO	MAD	CZE	ITA	SCO	CYP	NC	0
