= 2003 Monte Carlo Rally =

1st round of the 2003 World Rally Championship

2003 Monte Carlo Rally 71st Rallye Automobile de Monte-Carlo
Round 1 of the 2003 World Rally Championship season
Next event →
- Host country: Monaco
- Rally base: Monaco
- Dates run: January 24, 2003 – January 26, 2003
- Stages: 14 (415.02 km; 257.88 miles)
- Stage surface: Asphalt/snow
- Overall distance: 1,357.92 km (843.77 miles)

Statistics
- Crews: 50 at start, 29 at finish

Overall results
- Overall winner: (France) Sébastien Loeb (Monaco) Daniel Elena (France) Citroën Total

The 2003 Monte Carlo Rally (formally the 71st Rallye Automobile de Monte-Carlo) was the first round of the 2003 World Rally Championship. The race was held over three days between 24 and 26 January 2003, and was won by Citroën's Sébastien Loeb, his 2nd win in the World Rally Championship.

== Background ==
=== Entry list ===
No.	Driver	Co-Driver	Entrant	Car	Tyre
World Rally Championship manufacturer entries
1	(Finland) Marcus Grönholm	(Finland) Timo Rautiainen	(France) Marlboro Peugeot Total	Peugeot 206 WRC	M
2	(United Kingdom) Richard Burns	(United Kingdom) Robert Reid	(France) Marlboro Peugeot Total	Peugeot 206 WRC	M
3	(France) Gilles Panizzi	(France) Hervé Panizzi	(France) Marlboro Peugeot Total	Peugeot 206 WRC	M
4	(Estonia) Markko Märtin	(United Kingdom) Michael Park	(United Kingdom) Ford Motor Co. Ltd.	Ford Focus RS WRC '02	M
5	(Belgium) François Duval	(Belgium) Jean-Marc Fortin	(United Kingdom) Ford Motor Co. Ltd.	Ford Focus RS WRC '02	M
6	(Finland) Mikko Hirvonen	(Finland) Jarmo Lehtinen	(United Kingdom) Ford Motor Co. Ltd.	Ford Focus RS WRC '02	M
7	(Norway) Petter Solberg	(United Kingdom) Phil Mills	(Japan) 555 Subaru World Rally Team	Subaru Impreza S9 WRC '03	P
8	(Finland) Tommi Mäkinen	(Finland) Kaj Lindström	(Japan) 555 Subaru World Rally Team	Subaru Impreza S9 WRC '03	P
10	(Germany) Armin Schwarz	(Germany) Manfred Hiemer	(South Korea) Hyundai World Rally Team	Hyundai Accent WRC3	M
11	(Belgium) Freddy Loix	(Belgium) Sven Smeets	(South Korea) Hyundai World Rally Team	Hyundai Accent WRC3	M
14	(France) Didier Auriol	(France) Denis Giraudet	(Czech Republic) Škoda Motorsport	Škoda Octavia WRC Evo3	M
15	(Finland) Toni Gardemeister	(Finland) Paavo Lukander	(Czech Republic) Škoda Motorsport	Škoda Octavia WRC Evo3	M
17	(United Kingdom) Colin McRae	(United Kingdom) Derek Ringer	(France) Citroën Total WRT	Citroën Xsara WRC	M
18	(France) Sébastien Loeb	(Monaco) Daniel Elena	(France) Citroën Total WRT	Citroën Xsara WRC	M
19	(Spain) Carlos Sainz	(Spain) Marc Martí	(France) Citroën Total WRT	Citroën Xsara WRC	M
World Rally Championship entries
20	(France) Cédric Robert	(France) Gérald Bedon	Equipe de France FFSA	Peugeot 206 WRC	M
21	(Germany) Antony Warmbold	(United Kingdom) Gemma Price	(Germany) AW Rally Team	Ford Focus RS WRC '02	M
22	(Czech Republic) Roman Kresta	(Czech Republic) Jan Tománek	(France) Bozian Racing	Peugeot 206 WRC	M
23	(Republic of Ireland) Eamonn Boland	(Republic of Ireland) Francis Regan	(Republic of Ireland) Eamonn Boland	Subaru Impreza S5 WRC '99	P
101	(Switzerland) Olivier Burri	(Switzerland) Christophe Hofmann	(Switzerland) Olivier Burri	Toyota Corolla WRC	P
102	(Italy) Riccardo Errani	(Italy) Stefano Casadio	(Italy) Riccardo Errani	Škoda Octavia WRC Evo2	P
103	(Switzerland) Philippe Roux	(Switzerland) Paul Corthay	(Switzerland) Philppe Roux	Ford Focus RS WRC'01	P
104	(Hungary) Gergely Szabó	(Hungary) Zoltán Köhler	(Hungary) Gergely Szabó	Toyota Corolla WRC	P
105	(France) Serge Bernardin	(France) Frédéric Deziré	(France) Serge Bernardin	Peugeot 206 WRC	M
JWRC entries
51	(San Marino) Mirco Baldacci	(Italy) Giovanni Bernacchini	(Italy) Purity Auto	Fiat Punto S1600	M
52	(Sweden) Daniel Carlsson	(Sweden) Matthias Andersson	(Japan) Suzuki Sport	Suzuki Ignis S1600	M
54	(Finland) Kosti Katajamäki	(Finland) Miikka Anttila	(Germany) Volkswagen Racing	Volkswagen Polo S1600	M
55	(Norway) Martin Stenshorne	(United Kingdom) Clive Jenkins	(United Kingdom) Ford Motor Co. Ltd.	Ford Puma S1600	M
57	(Bulgaria) Dimitar Iliev	(Bulgaria) Petar Sivov	(Italy) Auto Sport Italia	Peugeot 206 S1600	M
58	(Argentina) Marcos Ligato	(Argentina) Rubén García	(Italy) Top Run SRL	Fiat Punto S1600	M
59	(Austria) Beppo Harrach	(Germany) Michael Kölbach	(Italy) Astra Racing	Ford Puma S1600	M
61	(France) Brice Tirabassi	(France) Jacques-Julien Renucci	(France) Renault Sport	Renault Clio S1600	M
62	(Sweden) Oscar Svedlund	(Sweden) Björn Nilsson	(Germany) Volkswagen Racing	Volkswagen Polo S1600	M
63	(Italy) Massimo Ceccato	(Italy) Mitia Dotta	(Italy) Top Run SRL	Fiat Punto S1600	M
64	(Finland) Ville-Pertti Teuronen	(Finland) Harri Kaapro	(Japan) Suzuki Sport	Suzuki Ignis S1600	M
65	(Lebanon) Abdo Feghali	(Lebanon) Joseph Matar	(Italy) Astra Racing	Ford Puma S1600	M
66	(France) Sébastien Ceccone	(France) Julien Giroux	(France) Citroën Total	Citroën Saxo S1600	M
67	(San Marino) Alessandro Broccoli	(Italy) Simona Girelli	(San Marino) Sab Motorsport	Opel Corsa S1600	M
68	(Croatia) Juraj Šebalj	(Croatia) Toni Klinc	Renault Croatia	Renault Clio S1600	M
69	(Spain) Salvador Cañellas Jr.	(Spain) Xavier Amigó	(Japan) Suzuki Sport	Suzuki Ignis S1600	M
70	(United Kingdom) Guy Wilks	(United Kingdom) Phil Pugh	(United Kingdom) Ford Motor Co. Ltd.	Ford Puma S1600	M
71	(Estonia) Urmo Aava	(Estonia) Kuldar Sikk	(Japan) Suzuki Sport	Suzuki Ignis S1600	M
73	(Bulgaria) Krum Donchev	(Bulgaria) Ruman Manolov	(Italy) Auto Sport Italia	Opel Corsa S1600	M
74	(United Kingdom) Kris Meeke	(United Kingdom) Chris Patterson	(Germany) Opel Motorsport	Opel Corsa S1600	M
76	(Italy) Luca Cecchettini	(Italy) Nicola Arena	(Italy) Top Run SRL	Fiat Punto S1600	M
78	(Germany) Vladan Vasiljevic	(Germany) Sebastian Geipel	(Germany) Volkswagen Racing	Volkswagen Polo S1600	M

=== Itinerary ===
All dates and times are CET (UTC+1).

Date	Time	No.	Stage name	Distance
Leg 1 — 196.30 km
24 January	07:48	SS1	Prunières — Embrun 1	28.36 km
24 January	09:21	SS2	Selonnet — Bréziers 1	22.52 km
24 January	11:24	SS3	Prunières — Embrun 2	28.36 km
24 January	12:57	SS4	Selonnet — Bréziers 2	22.52 km
24 January	14:30	SS5	Plan de Vitrolles — Faye 1	47.27 km
24 January	17:09	SS6	Plan de Vitrolles — Faye 2	47.27 km
Leg 2 — 114.52 km
25 January	08:33	SS7	Les 4 Chemins — Sigale 1	32.11 km
25 January	09:31	SS8	St Antonin — Tourette du Château 1	25.15 km
25 January	13:19	SS9	Les 4 Chemins — Sigale 2	32.11 km
25 January	14:17	SS10	St Antonin — Tourette du Château 2	25.15 km
Leg 3 — 104.20 km
26 January	09:15	SS11	Sospel — Turini — La Bollène 1	32.58 km
26 January	10:08	SS12	Lantosque — Lucéram 1	19.52 km
26 January	12:35	SS13	Sospel — Turini — La Bollène 2	32.58 km
26 January	13:28	SS14	Lantosque — Lucéram 2	19.52 km

== Report ==
=== Overall ===
Pos.	No.	Driver	Co-driver	Team	Car	Time	Difference	Points
1	18	(France) Sébastien Loeb	(Monaco) Daniel Elena	(France) Citroën Total WRT	Citroën Xsara WRC	4:29:11.4		10
2	17	(United Kingdom) Colin McRae	(United Kingdom) Derek Ringer	(France) Citroën Total WRT	Citroën Xsara WRC	4:29:49.5	+38.1	8
3	19	(Spain) Carlos Sainz	(Spain) Marc Martí	(France) Citroën Total WRT	Citroën Xsara WRC	4:30:03.6	+52.2	6
4	4	(Estonia) Markko Märtin	(United Kingdom) Michael Park	(United Kingdom) Ford Motor Co. Ltd.	Ford Focus RS WRC '02	4:30:06.9	+55.5	5
5	2	(United Kingdom) Richard Burns	(United Kingdom) Robert Reid	(France) Marlboro Peugeot Total	Peugeot 206 WRC	4:32:27.9	+3:16.5	4
6	20	(France) Cédric Robert	(France) Gérald Bedon	Equipe de France FFSA	Peugeot 206 WRC	4:34:28.1	+5:16.7	3
7	5	(Belgium) François Duval	(Belgium) Jean-Marc Fortin	(United Kingdom) Ford Motor Co. Ltd.	Ford Focus RS WRC '02	4:34:28.5	+5:17.1	2
8	10	(Germany) Armin Schwarz	(Germany) Manfred Hiemer	(South Korea) Hyundai World Rally Team	Hyundai Accent WRC3	4:35:53.7	+6:42.3	1

=== World Rally Cars ===
==== Classification ====
Position		No.	Driver	Co-driver	Entrant	Car	Time	Difference	Points
Event	Class	No.	Driver	Co-driver	Entrant	Car	Time	Difference	Points
1	1	18	(France) Sébastien Loeb	(Monaco) Daniel Elena	(France) Citroën Total WRT	Citroën Xsara WRC	4:29:11.4		10
2	2	17	(United Kingdom) Colin McRae	(United Kingdom) Derek Ringer	(France) Citroën Total WRT	Citroën Xsara WRC	4:29:49.5	+38.1	8
3	3	19	(Spain) Carlos Sainz	(Spain) Marc Martí	(France) Citroën Total WRT	Citroën Xsara WRC	4:30:03.6	+52.2	6
4	4	4	(Estonia) Markko Märtin	(United Kingdom) Michael Park	(United Kingdom) Ford Motor Co. Ltd.	Ford Focus RS WRC '02	4:30:06.9	+55.5	5
5	5	2	(United Kingdom) Richard Burns	(United Kingdom) Robert Reid	(France) Marlboro Peugeot Total	Peugeot 206 WRC	4:32:27.9	+3:16.5	4
7	6	5	(Belgium) François Duval	(Belgium) Jean-Marc Fortin	(United Kingdom) Ford Motor Co. Ltd.	Ford Focus RS WRC '02	4:34:28.5	+5:17.1	2
8	7	10	(Germany) Armin Schwarz	(Germany) Manfred Hiemer	(South Korea) Hyundai World Rally Team	Hyundai Accent WRC3	4:35:53.7	+6:42.3	1
9	8	14	(France) Didier Auriol	(France) Denis Giraudet	(Czech Republic) Škoda Motorsport	Škoda Octavia WRC Evo3	4:36:25.2	+7:13.8	0
13	9	1	(Finland) Marcus Grönholm	(Finland) Timo Rautiainen	(France) Marlboro Peugeot Total	Peugeot 206 WRC	5:02:43.2	+33:31.8	0
Retired SS9		3	(France) Gilles Panizzi	(France) Hervé Panizzi	(France) Marlboro Peugeot Total	Peugeot 206 WRC	Driver ill		0
Retired SS9		6	(Finland) Mikko Hirvonen	(Finland) Jarmo Lehtinen	(United Kingdom) Ford Motor Co. Ltd.	Ford Focus RS WRC '02	Accident		0
Retired SS9		11	(Belgium) Freddy Loix	(Belgium) Sven Smeets	(South Korea) Hyundai World Rally Team	Hyundai Accent WRC3	Accident		0
Retired SS5		7	(Norway) Petter Solberg	(United Kingdom) Phil Mills	(Japan) 555 Subaru World Rally Team	Subaru Impreza S9 WRC '03	Accident		0
Retired SS5		8	(Finland) Tommi Mäkinen	(Finland) Kaj Lindström	(Japan) 555 Subaru World Rally Team	Subaru Impreza S9 WRC '03	Accident		0
Retired SS2		15	(Finland) Toni Gardemeister	(Finland) Paavo Lukander	(Czech Republic) Škoda Motorsport	Škoda Octavia WRC Evo3	Engine		0

==== Special stages ====
Day	Stage	Stage name	Length	Winner	Car	Time	Class leaders
Leg 1 (24 Jan)	SS1	Prunières — Embrun 1	28.36 km	(Finland) Marcus Grönholm	Peugeot 206 WRC	18:07.6	(Finland) Marcus Grönholm
Leg 1 (24 Jan)	SS2	Selonnet — Bréziers 1	22.52 km	(Finland) Marcus Grönholm	Peugeot 206 WRC	16:00.3	(Finland) Marcus Grönholm
Leg 1 (24 Jan)	SS3	Prunières — Embrun 2	28.36 km	(France) Sébastien Loeb	Citroën Xsara WRC	17:54.5	(Finland) Marcus Grönholm
Leg 1 (24 Jan)	SS4	Selonnet — Bréziers 2	22.52 km	(Finland) Marcus Grönholm	Peugeot 206 WRC	15:33.7	(Finland) Marcus Grönholm
Leg 1 (24 Jan)	SS5	Plan de Vitrolles — Faye 1	47.27 km	(France) Sébastien Loeb	Citroën Xsara WRC	28:54.9	(Finland) Marcus Grönholm
Leg 1 (24 Jan)	SS6	Plan de Vitrolles — Faye 2	47.27 km	(United Kingdom) Colin McRae (France) Sébastien Loeb	Citroën Xsara WRC; Citroën Xsara WRC	30:04.7	(Finland) Marcus Grönholm
Leg 2 (25 Jan)	SS7	Les 4 Chemins — Sigale 1	32.11 km	Stage cancelled			(Finland) Marcus Grönholm
Leg 2 (25 Jan)	SS8	St Antonin — Tourette du Château 1	25.15 km	(France) Sébastien Loeb	Citroën Xsara WRC	18:08.0	(Finland) Marcus Grönholm
Leg 2 (25 Jan)	SS9	Les 4 Chemins — Sigale 2	32.11 km	(France) Sébastien Loeb	Citroën Xsara WRC	24:59.3	(France) Sébastien Loeb
Leg 2 (25 Jan)	SS10	St Antonin — Tourette du Château 2	25.15 km	(Spain) Carlos Sainz	Citroën Xsara WRC	17:52.3	(France) Sébastien Loeb
Leg 3 (26 Jan)	SS11	Sospel — Turini — La Bollène 1	32.58 km	(United Kingdom) Colin McRae	Citroën Xsara WRC	25:30.6	(France) Sébastien Loeb
Leg 3 (26 Jan)	SS12	Lantosque — Lucéram 1	19.52 km	(Estonia) Markko Märtin	Ford Focus RS WRC '02	14:09.4	(France) Sébastien Loeb
Leg 3 (26 Jan)	SS13	Sospel — Turini — La Bollène 2	32.58 km	(Spain) Carlos Sainz	Citroën Xsara WRC	24:52.0	(France) Sébastien Loeb
Leg 3 (26 Jan)	SS14	Lantosque — Lucéram 2	19.52 km	(Spain) Carlos Sainz	Citroën Xsara WRC	13:46.1	(France) Sébastien Loeb

==== Championship standings ====
Pos.	Drivers' championships			Co-drivers' championships			Manufacturers' championships		
Pos.	Move	Driver	Points	Move	Co-driver	Points	Move	Manufacturer	Points
1	New entry	(France) Sébastien Loeb	10	New entry	(Monaco) Daniel Elena	10	New entry	(France) Citroën Total WRT	18
2	New entry	(United Kingdom) Colin McRae	8	New entry	(United Kingdom) Derek Ringer	8	New entry	(United Kingdom) Ford Motor Co. Ltd.	10
3	New entry	(Spain) Carlos Sainz	6	New entry	(Spain) Marc Martí	6	New entry	(France) Marlboro Peugeot Total	6
4	New entry	(Estonia) Markko Märtin	5	New entry	(United Kingdom) Michael Park	5	New entry	(South Korea) Hyundai World Rally Team	3
5	New entry	(United Kingdom) Richard Burns	4	New entry	(United Kingdom) Robert Reid	4	New entry	(Czech Republic) Škoda Motorsport	2

=== Junior World Rally Championship ===
==== Classification ====
Position		No.	Driver	Co-driver	Entrant	Car	Time	Difference	Points
Event	Class	No.	Driver	Co-driver	Entrant	Car	Time	Difference	Points
17	1	61	(France) Brice Tirabassi	(France) Jacques-Julien Renucci	(France) Renault Sport	Renault Clio S1600	5:12:36.1		10
18	2	58	(Argentina) Marcos Ligato	(Argentina) Rubén García	(Italy) Top Run SRL	Fiat Punto S1600	5:17:52.8	+5:16.7	8
19	3	67	(San Marino) Alessandro Broccoli	(Italy) Simona Girelli	(San Marino) Sab Motorsport	Opel Corsa S1600	5:21:12.9	+8:36.8	6
20	4	71	(Estonia) Urmo Aava	(Estonia) Kuldar Sikk	(Japan) Suzuki Sport	Suzuki Ignis S1600	5:21:24.7	+8:48.6	5
21	5	63	(Italy) Massimo Ceccato	(Italy) Mitia Dotta	(Italy) Top Run SRL	Fiat Punto S1600	5:21:56.3	+9:20.2	4
22	6	68	(Croatia) Juraj Šebalj	(Croatia) Toni Klinc	Renault Croatia	Renault Clio S1600	5:25:00.0	+12:23.9	3
23	7	51	(San Marino) Mirco Baldacci	(Italy) Giovanni Bernacchini	(Italy) Purity Auto	Fiat Punto S1600	5:27:49.9	+15:13.8	2
24	8	59	(Austria) Beppo Harrach	(Germany) Michael Kölbach	(Italy) Astra Racing	Ford Puma S1600	5:31:43.4	+19:07.3	1
25	9	76	(Italy) Luca Cecchettini	(Italy) Nicola Arena	(Italy) Top Run SRL	Fiat Punto S1600	5:32:02.4	+19:26.3	0
26	10	65	(Lebanon) Abdo Feghali	(Lebanon) Joseph Matar	(Italy) Astra Racing	Ford Puma S1600	5:33:17.7	+20:41.6	0
27	11	73	(Bulgaria) Krum Donchev	(Bulgaria) Ruman Manolov	(Italy) Auto Sport Italia	Opel Corsa S1600	5:35:25.5	+22:49.4	0
29	12	74	(United Kingdom) Kris Meeke	(United Kingdom) Chris Patterson	(Germany) Opel Motorsport	Opel Corsa S1600	5:45:50.2	+33:14.1	0
Retired SS14		54	(Finland) Kosti Katajamäki	(Finland) Miikka Anttila	(Germany) Volkswagen Racing	Volkswagen Polo S1600	Excluded - brakes		0
Retired SS14		55	(Norway) Martin Stenshorne	(United Kingdom) Clive Jenkins	(United Kingdom) Ford Motor Co. Ltd.	Ford Puma S1600	Accident		0
Retired SS14		62	(Sweden) Oscar Svedlund	(Sweden) Björn Nilsson	(Germany) Volkswagen Racing	Volkswagen Polo S1600	Accident		0
Retired SS13		64	(Finland) Ville-Pertti Teuronen	(Finland) Harri Kaapro	(Japan) Suzuki Sport	Suzuki Ignis S1600	Accident		0
Retired SS13		69	(Spain) Salvador Cañellas Jr.	(Spain) Xavier Amigó	(Japan) Suzuki Sport	Suzuki Ignis S1600	Driveshaft		0
Retired SS12		70	(United Kingdom) Guy Wilks	(United Kingdom) Phil Pugh	(United Kingdom) Ford Motor Co. Ltd.	Ford Puma S1600	Accident		0
Retired SS8		52	(Sweden) Daniel Carlsson	(Sweden) Matthias Andersson	(Japan) Suzuki Sport	Suzuki Ignis S1600	Excluded		0
Retired SS8		78	(Germany) Vladan Vasiljevic	(Germany) Sebastian Geipel	(Germany) Volkswagen Racing	Volkswagen Polo S1600	Excluded		0
Retired SS3		57	(Bulgaria) Dimitar Iliev	(Bulgaria) Petar Sivov	(Italy) Auto Sport Italia	Peugeot 206 S1600	Accident		0
Retired SS1		66	(France) Sébastien Ceccone	(France) Julien Giroux	(France) Citroën Total	Citroën Saxo S1600	Accident		0

==== Special stages ====
Day	Stage	Stage name	Length	Winner	Car	Time	Class leaders
Leg 1 (24 January)	SS1	Prunières — Embrun 1	28.36 km	(France) Brice Tirabassi	Renault Clio S1600	21:16.2	(France) Brice Tirabassi
Leg 1 (24 January)	SS2	Selonnet — Bréziers 1	22.52 km	(Sweden) Daniel Carlsson	Suzuki Ignis S1600	18:12.2	(Sweden) Daniel Carlsson
Leg 1 (24 January)	SS3	Prunières — Embrun 2	28.36 km	(San Marino) Mirco Baldacci	Fiat Punto S1600	20:26.1	(France) Brice Tirabassi
Leg 1 (24 January)	SS4	Selonnet — Bréziers 2	22.52 km	(Sweden) Daniel Carlsson	Suzuki Ignis S1600	17:43.2	(France) Brice Tirabassi
Leg 1 (24 January)	SS5	Plan de Vitrolles — Faye 1	47.27 km	(Sweden) Daniel Carlsson	Suzuki Ignis S1600	33:21.5	(France) Brice Tirabassi
Leg 1 (24 January)	SS6	Plan de Vitrolles — Faye 2	47.27 km	(Sweden) Daniel Carlsson	Suzuki Ignis S1600	34:51.6	(Sweden) Daniel Carlsson
Leg 2 (25 January)	SS7	Les 4 Chemins — Sigale 1	32.11 km	Stage cancelled			(Sweden) Daniel Carlsson
Leg 2 (25 January)	SS8	St Antonin — Tourette du Château 1	25.15 km	(Argentina) Marcos Ligato	Fiat Punto S1600	19:52.5	(France) Brice Tirabassi
Leg 2 (25 January)	SS9	Les 4 Chemins — Sigale 2	32.11 km	Notional stage time			(France) Brice Tirabassi
Leg 2 (25 January)	SS10	St Antonin — Tourette du Château 2	25.15 km	Notional stage time			(France) Brice Tirabassi
Leg 3 (26 January)	SS11	Sospel — Turini — La Bollène 1	32.58 km	(France) Brice Tirabassi	Renault Clio S1600	28:57.7	(France) Brice Tirabassi
Leg 3 (26 January)	SS12	Lantosque — Lucéram 1	19.52 km	(Finland) Kosti Katajamäki	Volkswagen Polo S1600	15:48.7	(France) Brice Tirabassi
Leg 3 (26 January)	SS13	Sospel — Turini — La Bollène 2	32.58 km	(France) Brice Tirabassi	Renault Clio S1600	28:01.1	(France) Brice Tirabassi
Leg 3 (26 January)	SS14	Lantosque — Lucéram 2	19.52 km	(San Marino) Mirco Baldacci	Fiat Punto S1600	15:42.4	(France) Brice Tirabassi

==== Championship standings ====
Pos.	Drivers' championships		
Pos.	Move	Driver	Points
1	New entry	(France) Brice Tirabassi	10
2	New entry	(Argentina) Marcos Ligato	8
3	New entry	(San Marino) Alessandro Broccoli	6
4	New entry	(Estonia) Urmo Aava	5
5	New entry	(Italy) Massimo Ceccato	4
