= 2002 Rallye Deutschland =

10th round of the 2002 World Rally Championship

2002 Rallye Deutschland 21st ADAC Rallye Deutschland
Round 10 of the 2002 World Rally Championship season
| ← Previous event | Next event → |
- Host country: Germany
- Rally base: Trier
- Dates run: August 23, 2002 – August 25, 2002
- Stages: 23 (415.57 km; 258.22 miles)
- Stage surface: Asphalt
- Overall distance: 1,423.56 km (884.56 miles)

Statistics
- Crews: 87 at start, 42 at finish

Overall results
- Overall winner: (France) Sébastien Loeb (Monaco) Daniel Elena (France) Automobiles Citroën; Citroën Xsara WRC

The 2002 Rallye Deutschland (formally the 51st ADAC Rallye Deutschland) was the tenth round of the 2002 World Rally Championship. The race was held over three days between 23 August and 25 August 2002, and was won by Citroen's Sébastien Loeb, his 1st win in the World Rally Championship.

== Background ==
=== Entry list ===
| No. | Driver | Co-Driver | Entrant | Car | Tyre |
|---|---|---|---|---|---|
World Rally Championship manufacturer entries
| 1 | (United Kingdom) Richard Burns | (United Kingdom) Robert Reid | (France) Peugeot Total | Peugeot 206 WRC | MI |
| 2 | (Finland) Marcus Grönholm | (Finland) Timo Rautiainen | (France) Peugeot Total | Peugeot 206 WRC | MI |
| 3 | (Finland) Harri Rovanperä | (Finland) Voitto Silander | (France) Peugeot Total | Peugeot 206 WRC | MI |
| 4 | (Spain) Carlos Sainz | (Spain) Luis Moya | (United Kingdom) Ford Motor Co. Ltd. | Ford Focus RS WRC '02 | P |
| 5 | (United Kingdom) Colin McRae | (United Kingdom) Nicky Grist | (United Kingdom) Ford Motor Co. Ltd. | Ford Focus RS WRC '02 | P |
| 6 | (Estonia) Markko Märtin | (United Kingdom) Michael Park | (United Kingdom) Ford Motor Co. Ltd. | Ford Focus RS WRC '02 | P |
| 7 | (France) François Delecour | (France) Daniel Grataloup | (Japan) Marlboro Mitsubishi Ralliart | Mitsubishi Lancer WRC2 | MI |
| 8 | (United Kingdom) Alister McRae | (United Kingdom) David Senior | (Japan) Marlboro Mitsubishi Ralliart | Mitsubishi Lancer WRC2 | MI |
| 10 | (Finland) Tommi Mäkinen | (Finland) Kaj Lindström | (Japan) 555 Subaru World Rally Team | Subaru Impreza S8 WRC '02 | P |
| 11 | (Norway) Petter Solberg | (United Kingdom) Phil Mills | (Japan) 555 Subaru World Rally Team | Subaru Impreza S8 WRC '02 | P |
| 12 | (Austria) Achim Mörtl | (Germany) Klaus Wicha | (Japan) 555 Subaru World Rally Team | Subaru Impreza S7 WRC '01 | P |
| 14 | (Sweden) Kenneth Eriksson | (Sweden) Tina Thörner | (Czech Republic) Škoda Motorsport | Škoda Octavia WRC Evo2 | MI |
| 15 | (Finland) Toni Gardemeister | (Finland) Paavo Lukander | (Czech Republic) Škoda Motorsport | Škoda Octavia WRC Evo2 | MI |
| 16 | (Germany) Matthias Kahle | (Germany) Peter Göbel | (Czech Republic) Škoda Motorsport | Škoda Octavia WRC Evo2 | MI |
| 17 | (Germany) Armin Schwarz | (Germany) Manfred Hiemer | (South Korea) Hyundai Castrol World Rally Team | Hyundai Accent WRC3 | MI |
| 18 | (Belgium) Freddy Loix | (Belgium) Sven Smeets | (South Korea) Hyundai Castrol World Rally Team | Hyundai Accent WRC3 | MI |
World Rally Championship entries
| 20 | (Spain) Jesús Puras | (Spain) Marc Martí | (France) Automobiles Citroën | Citroën Xsara WRC | MI |
| 21 | (France) Sébastien Loeb | (Monaco) Daniel Elena | (France) Automobiles Citroën | Citroën Xsara WRC | MI |
| 22 | (France) Philippe Bugalski | (France) Jean-Paul Chiaroni | (France) Automobiles Citroën | Citroën Xsara WRC | MI |
| 25 | (Germany) Armin Kremer | (Germany) Dieter Schneppenheim | (Germany) Armin Kremer | Ford Focus RS WRC '01 | P |
| 26 | (Japan) Toshihiro Arai | (New Zealand) Tony Sircombe | (Japan) 555 Subaru World Rally Team | Subaru Impreza S7 WRC '01 | P |
| 27 | (Belgium) Bruno Thiry | (Belgium) Stéphane Prévot | (Belgium) Peugeot Team Bel-Lux | Peugeot 206 WRC | MI |
| 33 | (Netherlands) Rocco Theunissen | (Belgium) Elisabeth Genten | (Belgium) Autostal Duindistel | Toyota Corolla WRC | MI |
| 103 | (Netherlands) Erik Wevers | (Netherlands) Michiel Poel | (Netherlands) Autostal Duindistel | Toyota Corolla WRC | MI |
| 104 | (Netherlands) Peter Bijvelds | (Belgium) Piet Bijvelds | (Netherlands) Peter Bijvelds | Mitsubishi Lancer Evo 6.5 | —N/a |
| 105 | (Slovakia) Tibor Cserhalmi | (Slovakia) Karol Bodnár | (Slovakia) Mimex Motorsport | Škoda Octavia WRC | MI |
| 106 | (Czech Republic) Jan Kopecký | (Czech Republic) Filip Schovánek | (Czech Republic) Matador Czech National Team | Toyota Corolla WRC | MI |
| 118 | (Italy) Riccardo Errani | (Italy) Stefano Casadio | (Italy) Riccardo Errani | Subaru Impreza WRX | —N/a |
| 119 | (Germany) Anton Werner | (Germany) Peter Kroll | (Germany) MCM Metten | Mitsubishi Lancer Evo VI | —N/a |
JWRC entries
| 51 | (Italy) Andrea Dallavilla | (Italy) Giovanni Bernacchini | (Italy) Vieffe Corse SRL | Citroën Saxo S1600 | MI |
| 52 | (United Kingdom) Niall McShea | (United Kingdom) Michael Orr | (Germany) Opel Motorsport | Opel Corsa S1600 | MI |
| 53 | (Italy) Giandomenico Basso | (Italy) Luigi Pirollo | (Italy) Top Run SRL | Fiat Punto S1600 | MI |
| 54 | (Norway) Martin Stenshorne | (United Kingdom) Clive Jenkins | (Germany) Opel Motorsport | Opel Corsa S1600 | MI |
| 55 | (Belgium) François Duval | (Belgium) Jean-Marc Fortin | (United Kingdom) Ford Motor Co. Ltd. | Ford Puma S1600 | MI |
| 56 | (Finland) Jussi Välimäki | (Finland) Tero Gardemeister | (France) Citroën Sport | Citroën Saxo S1600 | MI |
| 57 | (Paraguay) Alejandro Galanti | (Spain) Xavier Amigó | (Italy) Astra Racing | Ford Puma S1600 | MI |
| 58 | (Italy) Christian Chemin | (Italy) Simone Scattolin | (Italy) Hawk Racing Club | Fiat Punto S1600 | MI |
| 59 | (Finland) Juha Kangas | (Finland) Jani Laaksonen | (Japan) Suzuki Sport | Suzuki Ignis S1600 | MI |
| 60 | (Italy) Nicola Caldani | (Italy) Dario D'Esposito | (Italy) Procar Rally Team | Fiat Punto S1600 | MI |
| 61 | (United Kingdom) Gwyndaf Evans | (United Kingdom) Chris Patterson | (United Kingdom) MG Sport & Racing | MG ZR S1600 | MI |
| 62 | (Finland) Janne Tuohino | (Finland) Petri Vihavainen | (France) Citroën Sport | Citroën Saxo S1600 | MI |
| 63 | (United Kingdom) Martin Rowe | (United Kingdom) Chris Wood | (Italy) Astra Racing | Ford Puma S1600 | MI |
| 64 | (Italy) Gianluigi Galli | (Italy) Guido D'Amore | (Italy) Top Run SRL | Fiat Punto S1600 | MI |
| 65 | (Spain) Daniel Solà | (Spain) Álex Romaní | (France) Citroën Sport | Citroën Saxo S1600 | MI |
| 66 | (San Marino) Mirco Baldacci | (Italy) Maurizio Barone | (Italy) Vieffe Corse SRL | Citroën Saxo S1600 | MI |
| 67 | (Sweden) Daniel Carlsson | (Sweden) Mattias Andersson | (Italy) Astra Racing | Ford Puma S1600 | MI |
| 68 | (Germany) Nikolaus Schelle | (Germany) Tanja Geilhausen | (Japan) Suzuki Sport | Suzuki Ignis S1600 | MI |
| 69 | (Finland) Kosti Katajamäki | (Finland) Jakke Honkanen | (Germany) Volkswagen Racing | Volkswagen Polo S1600 | MI |
| 70 | (Germany) Sven Haaf | (Germany) Michael Kölbach | (France) Citroën Sport | Citroën Saxo S1600 | MI |
| 71 | (Austria) David Doppelreiter | (Norway) Ola Fløene | (Austria) Schmidt Racing | Peugeot 206 S1600 | MI |
| 73 | (Andorra) Albert Lloverá | (Spain) Marc Corral | (Spain) Pronto Racing | Fiat Punto S1600 | MI |
| 75 | (Japan) Kazuhiko Niwa | (Japan) Tatsuya Ideue | (Japan) Suzuki Sport | Suzuki Ignis S1600 | MI |
| 76 | (Norway) Alexander Foss | (Norway) Cato Menkerud | (United Kingdom) Ford Motor Co. Ltd. | Ford Puma S1600 | MI |
| 78 | (Lebanon) Roger Feghali | (Italy) Nicola Arena | (Italy) Astra Racing | Ford Puma S1600 | MI |

=== Itinerary ===
All dates and times are CEST (UTC+2).

| Date | Time | No. | Stage name | Distance |
|---|---|---|---|---|
Leg 1 — 148.14 km
| 23 August | 07:58 | SS1 | Dhrontal 1 | 12.16 km |
| 23 August | 08:49 | SS2 | Schönes Moselland 1 | 23.82 km |
| 23 August | 09:32 | SS3 | Moselwein 1 | 22.28 km |
| 23 August | 12:10 | SS4 | Dhrontal 2 | 12.18 km |
| 23 August | 13:01 | SS5 | Schönes Moselland 2 | 23.82 km |
| 23 August | 14:09 | SS6 | Stein und Wein 1 | 15.80 km |
| 23 August | 16:37 | SS7 | Moselwein 2 | 22.28 km |
| 23 August | 17:40 | SS8 | Stein und Wein 2 | 15.80 km |
Leg 2 — 164.50 km
| 24 August | 09:30 | SS9 | Maiwald 1 | 18.76 km |
| 24 August | 09:58 | SS10 | Panzerplatte 1 | 35.56 km |
| 24 August | 12:38 | SS11 | Maiwald 2 | 18.76 km |
| 24 August | 13:06 | SS12 | Hahlkreuz | 8.31 km |
| 24 August | 13:29 | SS13 | Erzweiler 1 | 20.87 km |
| 24 August | 16:04 | SS14 | Panzerplatte 2 | 35.56 km |
| 24 August | 16:52 | SS15 | Erzweiler 2 | 20.87 km |
| 24 August | 19:17 | SS16 | St. Wendel 1 | 5.81 km |
Leg 3 — 102.93 km
| 25 August | 08:10 | SS17 | Peterberg 1 | 15.03 km |
| 25 August | 08:38 | SS18 | St. Wendeler Land 1 | 17.71 km |
| 25 August | 09:11 | SS19 | Bosenberg 1 | 15.82 km |
| 25 August | 11:16 | SS20 | Peterberg 2 | 15.03 km |
| 25 August | 11:44 | SS21 | St. Wendeler Land 2 | 17.71 km |
| 25 August | 12:17 | SS22 | Bosenberg 2 | 15.82 km |
| 25 August | 13:40 | SS23 | St. Wendel 2 | 5.81 km |

== Results ==
=== Overall ===
| Pos. | No. | Driver | Co-driver | Team | Car | Time | Difference | Points |
|---|---|---|---|---|---|---|---|---|
| 1 | 21 | (France) Sébastien Loeb | (Monaco) Daniel Elena | (France) Automobiles Citroën | Citroën Xsara WRC | 3:47:17.3 | | 10 |
| 2 | 1 | (United Kingdom) Richard Burns | (United Kingdom) Robert Reid | (France) Peugeot Total | Peugeot 206 WRC | 3:47:31.6 | +14.3 | 6 |
| 3 | 2 | (Finland) Marcus Grönholm | (Finland) Timo Rautiainen | (France) Peugeot Total | Peugeot 206 WRC | 3:48:36.4 | +1:19.1 | 4 |
| 4 | 5 | (United Kingdom) Colin McRae | (United Kingdom) Nicky Grist | (United Kingdom) Ford Motor Co. Ltd. | Ford Focus RS WRC '02 | 3:51:02.6 | +3:45.3 | 3 |
| 5 | 27 | (Belgium) Bruno Thiry | (Belgium) Stéphane Prévot | (Belgium) Peugeot Team Bel-Lux | Peugeot 206 WRC | 3:52:36.1 | +5:18.8 | 2 |
| 6 | 6 | (Estonia) Markko Märtin | (United Kingdom) Michael Park | (United Kingdom) Ford Motor Co. Ltd. | Ford Focus RS WRC '02 | 3:52:50.3 | +5:33.0 | 1 |

=== World Rally Cars ===
==== Classification ====
| Position | | No. | Driver | Co-driver | Entrant | Car | Time | Difference | Points |
| Event | Class | No. | Driver | Co-driver | Entrant | Car | Time | Difference | Points |
|---|---|---|---|---|---|---|---|---|---|
| 2 | 1 | 1 | (United Kingdom) Richard Burns | (United Kingdom) Robert Reid | (France) Peugeot Total | Peugeot 206 WRC | 3:47:31.6 | | 6 |
| 3 | 2 | 2 | (Finland) Marcus Grönholm | (Finland) Timo Rautiainen | (France) Peugeot Total | Peugeot 206 WRC | 3:48:36.4 | +1:04.8 | 4 |
| 4 | 3 | 5 | (United Kingdom) Colin McRae | (United Kingdom) Nicky Grist | (United Kingdom) Ford Motor Co. Ltd. | Ford Focus RS WRC '02 | 3:51:02.6 | +3:31.0 | 3 |
| 6 | 4 | 6 | (Estonia) Markko Märtin | (United Kingdom) Michael Park | (United Kingdom) Ford Motor Co. Ltd. | Ford Focus RS WRC '02 | 3:52:50.3 | +5:18.7 | 1 |
| 7 | 5 | 10 | (Finland) Tommi Mäkinen | (Finland) Kaj Lindström | (Japan) 555 Subaru World Rally Team | Subaru Impreza S8 WRC '02 | 3:52:56.5 | +5:24.9 | 0 |
| 8 | 6 | 4 | (Spain) Carlos Sainz | (Spain) Luis Moya | (United Kingdom) Ford Motor Co. Ltd. | Ford Focus RS WRC '02 | 3:53:34.3 | +6:02.7 | 0 |
| 9 | 7 | 7 | (France) François Delecour | (France) Daniel Grataloup | (Japan) Marlboro Mitsubishi Ralliart | Mitsubishi Lancer WRC2 | 3:53:53.2 | +6:21.6 | 0 |
| 10 | 8 | 14 | (Sweden) Kenneth Eriksson | (Sweden) Tina Thörner | (Czech Republic) Škoda Motorsport | Škoda Octavia WRC Evo2 | 4:00:51.5 | +13:19.9 | 0 |
| Retired SS20 | | 3 | (Finland) Harri Rovanperä | (Finland) Voitto Silander | (France) Peugeot Total | Peugeot 206 WRC | Accident | | 0 |
| Retired SS15 | | 15 | (Finland) Toni Gardemeister | (Finland) Paavo Lukander | (Czech Republic) Škoda Motorsport | Škoda Octavia WRC Evo2 | Accident damage | | 0 |
| Retired SS12 | | 11 | (Norway) Petter Solberg | (United Kingdom) Phil Mills | (Japan) 555 Subaru World Rally Team | Subaru Impreza S8 WRC '02 | Accident | | 0 |
| Retired SS10 | | 17 | (Germany) Armin Schwarz | (Germany) Manfred Hiemer | (South Korea) Hyundai Castrol World Rally Team | Hyundai Accent WRC3 | Accident | | 0 |
| Retired SS9 | | 12 | (Austria) Achim Mörtl | (Germany) Klaus Wicha | (Japan) 555 Subaru World Rally Team | Subaru Impreza S7 WRC '01 | Accident | | 0 |
| Retired SS9 | | 18 | (Belgium) Freddy Loix | (Belgium) Sven Smeets | (South Korea) Hyundai Castrol World Rally Team | Hyundai Accent WRC3 | Engine | | 0 |
| Retired SS8 | | 8 | (United Kingdom) Alister McRae | (United Kingdom) David Senior | (Japan) Marlboro Mitsubishi Ralliart | Mitsubishi Lancer WRC2 | Turbo | | 0 |
| Retired SS3 | | 16 | (Germany) Matthias Kahle | (Germany) Peter Göbel | (Czech Republic) Škoda Motorsport | Škoda Octavia WRC Evo2 | Engine | | 0 |

==== Special stages ====
| Day | Stage | Stage name | Length | Winner | Car | Time | Class leaders |
|---|---|---|---|---|---|---|---|
| Leg 1 (23 Aug) | SS1 | Dhrontal 1 | 12.16 km | (United Kingdom) Richard Burns (Finland) Marcus Grönholm | Peugeot 206 WRC; Peugeot 206 WRC | 8:27.9 | (United Kingdom) Richard Burns (Finland) Marcus Grönholm |
| Leg 1 (23 Aug) | SS2 | Schönes Moselland 1 | 23.82 km | (France) Sébastien Loeb | Citroën Xsara WRC | 14:10.8 | (Finland) Marcus Grönholm |
| Leg 1 (23 Aug) | SS3 | Moselwein 1 | 22.28 km | (France) Sébastien Loeb | Citroën Xsara WRC | 13:24.2 | (France) Sébastien Loeb |
| Leg 1 (23 Aug) | SS4 | Dhrontal 2 | 12.18 km | (France) Sébastien Loeb | Citroën Xsara WRC | 8:23.8 | (France) Sébastien Loeb |
| Leg 1 (23 Aug) | SS5 | Schönes Moselland 2 | 23.82 km | (France) Sébastien Loeb | Citroën Xsara WRC | 13:53.8 | (France) Sébastien Loeb |
| Leg 1 (23 Aug) | SS6 | Stein und Wein 1 | 15.80 km | (France) Sébastien Loeb | Citroën Xsara WRC | 8:33.5 | (France) Sébastien Loeb |
| Leg 1 (23 Aug) | SS7 | Moselwein 2 | 22.28 km | Stage cancelled | | | (France) Sébastien Loeb |
| Leg 1 (23 Aug) | SS8 | Stein und Wein 2 | 15.80 km | (France) Sébastien Loeb | Citroën Xsara WRC | 8:31.5 | (France) Sébastien Loeb |
| Leg 2 (24 Aug) | SS9 | Maiwald 1 | 18.76 km | (Finland) Marcus Grönholm | Peugeot 206 WRC | 10:58.6 | (France) Sébastien Loeb |
| Leg 2 (24 Aug) | SS10 | Panzerplatte 1 | 35.56 km | (Finland) Marcus Grönholm | Peugeot 206 WRC | 21:27.0 | (France) Sébastien Loeb |
| Leg 2 (24 Aug) | SS11 | Maiwald 2 | 18.76 km | (Finland) Marcus Grönholm | Peugeot 206 WRC | 10:52.0 | (France) Sébastien Loeb |
| Leg 2 (24 Aug) | SS12 | Hahlkreuz | 8.31 km | (United Kingdom) Richard Burns | Peugeot 206 WRC | 4:53.3 | (France) Sébastien Loeb |
| Leg 2 (24 Aug) | SS13 | Erzweiler 1 | 20.87 km | (France) Sébastien Loeb | Citroën Xsara WRC | 12:56.6 | (France) Sébastien Loeb |
| Leg 2 (24 Aug) | SS14 | Panzerplatte 2 | 35.56 km | (Finland) Marcus Grönholm | Peugeot 206 WRC | 20:39.7 | (France) Sébastien Loeb |
| Leg 2 (24 Aug) | SS15 | Erzweiler 2 | 20.87 km | (France) Sébastien Loeb | Citroën Xsara WRC | 12:21.1 | (France) Sébastien Loeb |
| Leg 2 (24 Aug) | SS16 | St. Wendel 1 | 5.81 km | (Finland) Marcus Grönholm | Peugeot 206 WRC | 3:36.5 | (France) Sébastien Loeb |
| Leg 3 (25 Aug) | SS17 | Peterberg 1 | 15.03 km | (France) Sébastien Loeb | Citroën Xsara WRC | 8:07.6 | (France) Sébastien Loeb |
| Leg 3 (25 Aug) | SS18 | St. Wendeler Land 1 | 17.71 km | (United Kingdom) Richard Burns | Peugeot 206 WRC | 8:46.4 | (France) Sébastien Loeb |
| Leg 3 (25 Aug) | SS19 | Bosenberg 1 | 15.82 km | (France) Sébastien Loeb | Citroën Xsara WRC | 7:39.0 | (France) Sébastien Loeb |
| Leg 3 (25 Aug) | SS20 | Peterberg 2 | 15.03 km | (United Kingdom) Richard Burns | Peugeot 206 WRC | 8:09.1 | (France) Sébastien Loeb |
| Leg 3 (25 Aug) | SS21 | St. Wendeler Land 2 | 17.71 km | (United Kingdom) Richard Burns | Peugeot 206 WRC | 8:46.3 | (France) Sébastien Loeb |
| Leg 3 (25 Aug) | SS22 | Bosenberg 2 | 15.82 km | (France) Sébastien Loeb | Citroën Xsara WRC | 7:38.9 | (France) Sébastien Loeb |
| Leg 3 (25 Aug) | SS23 | St. Wendel 2 | 5.81 km | (United Kingdom) Richard Burns | Peugeot 206 WRC | 3:36.9 | (France) Sébastien Loeb |

==== Championship standings ====
| Pos. | Drivers' championships | | | Co-drivers' championships | | | Manufacturers' championships | | |
| Pos. | Move | Driver | Points | Move | Co-driver | Points | Move | Manufacturer | Points |
|---|---|---|---|---|---|---|---|---|---|
| 1 | | (Finland) Marcus Grönholm | 51 | | (Finland) Timo Rautiainen | 51 | | (France) Peugeot Total | 115 |
| 2 | | (United Kingdom) Colin McRae | 33 | | (United Kingdom) Nicky Grist | 33 | | (United Kingdom) Ford Motor Co. Ltd. | 81 |
| 3 | 1 | (United Kingdom) Richard Burns | 31 | 1 | (United Kingdom) Robert Reid | 31 | | (Japan) 555 Subaru World Rally Team | 42 |
| 4 | 1 | (Spain) Carlos Sainz | 26 | 1 | (Spain) Luis Moya | 26 | | (Czech Republic) Škoda Motorsport | 8 |
| 5 | | (France) Gilles Panizzi | 21 | | (France) Hervé Panizzi | 21 | | (Japan) Marlboro Mitsubishi Ralliart | 8 |

=== Junior World Rally Championship ===
==== Classification ====
| Position | | No. | Driver | Co-driver | Entrant | Car | Time | Difference | Points |
| Event | Class | No. | Driver | Co-driver | Entrant | Car | Time | Difference | Points |
|---|---|---|---|---|---|---|---|---|---|
| 12 | 1 | 65 | (Spain) Daniel Solà | (Spain) Álex Romaní | (France) Citroën Sport | Citroën Saxo S1600 | 4:10:39.6 | | 10 |
| 15 | 2 | 51 | (Italy) Andrea Dallavilla | (Italy) Giovanni Bernacchini | (Italy) Vieffe Corse SRL | Citroën Saxo S1600 | 4:13:27.0 | +2:47.4 | 6 |
| 17 | 3 | 68 | (Germany) Nikolaus Schelle | (Germany) Tanja Geilhausen | (Japan) Suzuki Sport | Suzuki Ignis S1600 | 4:14:12.8 | +3:33.2 | 4 |
| 18 | 4 | 66 | (San Marino) Mirco Baldacci | (Italy) Maurizio Barone | (Italy) Vieffe Corse SRL | Citroën Saxo S1600 | 4:16:01.0 | +5:21.4 | 3 |
| 19 | 5 | 63 | (United Kingdom) Martin Rowe | (United Kingdom) Chris Wood | (Italy) Astra Racing | Ford Puma S1600 | 4:17:27.4 | +6:47.8 | 2 |
| 20 | 6 | 69 | (Finland) Kosti Katajamäki | (Finland) Jakke Honkanen | (Germany) Volkswagen Racing | Volkswagen Polo S1600 | 4:18:59.6 | +8:20.0 | 1 |
| 21 | 7 | 53 | (Italy) Giandomenico Basso | (Italy) Luigi Pirollo | (Italy) Top Run SRL | Fiat Punto S1600 | 4:19:23.0 | +8:43.4 | 0 |
| 23 | 8 | 58 | (Italy) Christian Chemin | (Italy) Simone Scattolin | (Italy) Hawk Racing Club | Fiat Punto S1600 | 4:23:48.3 | +13:08.7 | 0 |
| 36 | 9 | 75 | (Japan) Kazuhiko Niwa | (Japan) Tatsuya Ideue | (Japan) Suzuki Sport | Suzuki Ignis S1600 | 4:44:22.9 | +33:43.3 | 0 |
| Retired SS21 | | 55 | (Belgium) François Duval | (Belgium) Jean-Marc Fortin | (United Kingdom) Ford Motor Co. Ltd. | Ford Puma S1600 | Engine | | 0 |
| Retired SS21 | | 78 | (Lebanon) Roger Feghali | (Italy) Nicola Arena | (Italy) Astra Racing | Ford Puma S1600 | Clutch | | 0 |
| Retired SS17 | | 62 | (Finland) Janne Tuohino | (Finland) Petri Vihavainen | (France) Citroën Sport | Citroën Saxo S1600 | Accident | | 0 |
| Retired SS16 | | 73 | (Andorra) Albert Lloverá | (Spain) Marc Corral | (Spain) Pronto Racing | Fiat Punto S1600 | Engine | | 0 |
| Retired SS14 | | 52 | (United Kingdom) Niall McShea | (United Kingdom) Michael Orr | (Germany) Opel Motorsport | Opel Corsa S1600 | Accident | | 0 |
| Retired SS14 | | 56 | (Finland) Jussi Välimäki | (Finland) Tero Gardemeister | (France) Citroën Sport | Citroën Saxo S1600 | Mechanical | | 0 |
| Retired SS14 | | 76 | (Norway) Alexander Foss | (Norway) Cato Menkerud | (United Kingdom) Ford Motor Co. Ltd. | Ford Puma S1600 | Accident damage | | 0 |
| Retired SS13 | | 60 | (Italy) Nicola Caldani | (Italy) Dario D'Esposito | (Italy) Procar Rally Team | Fiat Punto S1600 | Electrical | | 0 |
| Retired SS12 | | 67 | (Sweden) Daniel Carlsson | (Sweden) Mattias Andersson | (Italy) Astra Racing | Ford Puma S1600 | Engine | | 0 |
| Retired SS10 | | 70 | (Germany) Sven Haaf | (Germany) Michael Kölbach | (France) Citroën Sport | Citroën Saxo S1600 | Engine | | 0 |
| Retired SS9 | | 59 | (Finland) Juha Kangas | (Finland) Jani Laaksonen | (Japan) Suzuki Sport | Suzuki Ignis S1600 | Accident | | 0 |
| Retired SS4 | | 54 | (Norway) Martin Stenshorne | (United Kingdom) Clive Jenkins | (Germany) Opel Motorsport | Opel Corsa S1600 | Mechanical | | 0 |
| Retired SS4 | | 64 | (Italy) Gianluigi Galli | (Italy) Guido D'Amore | (Italy) Top Run SRL | Fiat Punto S1600 | Mechanical | | 0 |
| Retired SS2 | | 71 | (Austria) David Doppelreiter | (Norway) Ola Fløene | (Austria) Schmidt Racing | Peugeot 206 S1600 | Accident | | 0 |
| Retired SS1 | | 61 | (United Kingdom) Gwyndaf Evans | (United Kingdom) Chris Patterson | (United Kingdom) MG Sport & Racing | MG ZR S1600 | No fuel | | 0 |
| Retired SS0 | | 57 | (Paraguay) Alejandro Galanti | (Spain) Xavier Amigó | (Italy) Astra Racing | Ford Puma S1600 | Shakedown accident | | 0 |

==== Special stages ====
| Day | Stage | Stage name | Length | Winner | Car | Time | Class leaders |
|---|---|---|---|---|---|---|---|
| Leg 1 (23 Aug) | SS1 | Dhrontal 1 | 12.16 km | (Italy) Andrea Dallavilla | Citroën Saxo S1600 | 9:20.2 | (Italy) Andrea Dallavilla |
| Leg 1 (23 Aug) | SS2 | Schönes Moselland 1 | 23.82 km | (Italy) Andrea Dallavilla | Citroën Saxo S1600 | 15:31.3 | (Italy) Andrea Dallavilla |
| Leg 1 (23 Aug) | SS3 | Moselwein 1 | 22.28 km | (United Kingdom) Niall McShea | Opel Corsa S1600 | 15:01.8 | (United Kingdom) Niall McShea |
| Leg 1 (23 Aug) | SS4 | Dhrontal 2 | 12.18 km | (Italy) Andrea Dallavilla | Citroën Saxo S1600 | 9:13.5 | (United Kingdom) Niall McShea |
| Leg 1 (23 Aug) | SS5 | Schönes Moselland 2 | 23.82 km | (Spain) Daniel Solà | Citroën Saxo S1600 | 15:13.8 | (United Kingdom) Niall McShea |
| Leg 1 (23 Aug) | SS6 | Stein und Wein 1 | 15.80 km | (Germany) Sven Haaf | Citroën Saxo S1600 | 9:28.3 | (United Kingdom) Niall McShea |
| Leg 1 (23 Aug) | SS7 | Moselwein 2 | 22.28 km | Stage cancelled | | | (United Kingdom) Niall McShea |
| Leg 1 (23 Aug) | SS8 | Stein und Wein 2 | 15.80 km | (Belgium) François Duval | Ford Puma S1600 | 9:20.7 | (Germany) Sven Haaf |
| Leg 2 (24 Aug) | SS9 | Maiwald 1 | 18.76 km | (Belgium) François Duval | Ford Puma S1600 | 11:54.4 | (Belgium) François Duval |
| Leg 2 (24 Aug) | SS10 | Panzerplatte 1 | 35.56 km | Notional stage time | | | (Belgium) François Duval |
| Leg 2 (24 Aug) | SS11 | Maiwald 2 | 18.76 km | (Belgium) François Duval | Ford Puma S1600 | 11:44.5 | (Belgium) François Duval |
| Leg 2 (24 Aug) | SS12 | Hahlkreuz | 8.31 km | (Italy) Andrea Dallavilla | Citroën Saxo S1600 | 5:13.1 | (Belgium) François Duval |
| Leg 2 (24 Aug) | SS13 | Erzweiler 1 | 20.87 km | (Italy) Andrea Dallavilla | Citroën Saxo S1600 | 13:40.4 | (Belgium) François Duval |
| Leg 2 (24 Aug) | SS14 | Panzerplatte 2 | 35.56 km | (Italy) Andrea Dallavilla | Citroën Saxo S1600 | 22:27.2 | (Belgium) François Duval |
| Leg 2 (24 Aug) | SS15 | Erzweiler 2 | 20.87 km | (Italy) Andrea Dallavilla | Citroën Saxo S1600 | 13:26.3 | (Belgium) François Duval |
| Leg 2 (24 Aug) | SS16 | St. Wendel 1 | 5.81 km | (Germany) Nikolaus Schelle | Suzuki Ignis S1600 | 4:00.1 | (Belgium) François Duval |
| Leg 3 (25 Aug) | SS17 | Peterberg 1 | 15.03 km | (Belgium) François Duval | Ford Puma S1600 | 9:01.1 | (Belgium) François Duval |
| Leg 3 (25 Aug) | SS18 | St. Wendeler Land 1 | 17.71 km | (Spain) Daniel Solà | Citroën Saxo S1600 | 9:47.3 | (Belgium) François Duval |
| Leg 3 (25 Aug) | SS19 | Bosenberg 1 | 15.82 km | (Italy) Giandomenico Basso | Fiat Punto S1600 | 8:39.2 | (Spain) Daniel Solà |
| Leg 3 (25 Aug) | SS20 | Peterberg 2 | 15.03 km | (Belgium) François Duval | Ford Puma S1600 | 9:05.1 | (Spain) Daniel Solà |
| Leg 3 (25 Aug) | SS21 | St. Wendeler Land 2 | 17.71 km | (Italy) Giandomenico Basso | Fiat Punto S1600 | 9:47.0 | (Spain) Daniel Solà |
| Leg 3 (25 Aug) | SS22 | Bosenberg 2 | 15.82 km | (Italy) Giandomenico Basso | Fiat Punto S1600 | 8:30.6 | (Spain) Daniel Solà |
| Leg 3 (25 Aug) | SS23 | St. Wendel 2 | 5.81 km | (Germany) Nikolaus Schelle | Suzuki Ignis S1600 | 4:01.4 | (Spain) Daniel Solà |

==== Championship standings ====
| Pos. | Drivers' championships | | |
| Pos. | Move | Driver | Points |
|---|---|---|---|
| 1 | | (Spain) Daniel Solà | 23 |
| 2 | 1 | (Italy) Andrea Dallavilla | 18 |
| 3 | 1 | (Finland) Janne Tuohino | 12 |
| 4 | | (Belgium) François Duval | 11 |
| 5 | | (Italy) Nicola Caldani | 10 |
