= Citroën Xsara WRC =

Citroën World Rally Car

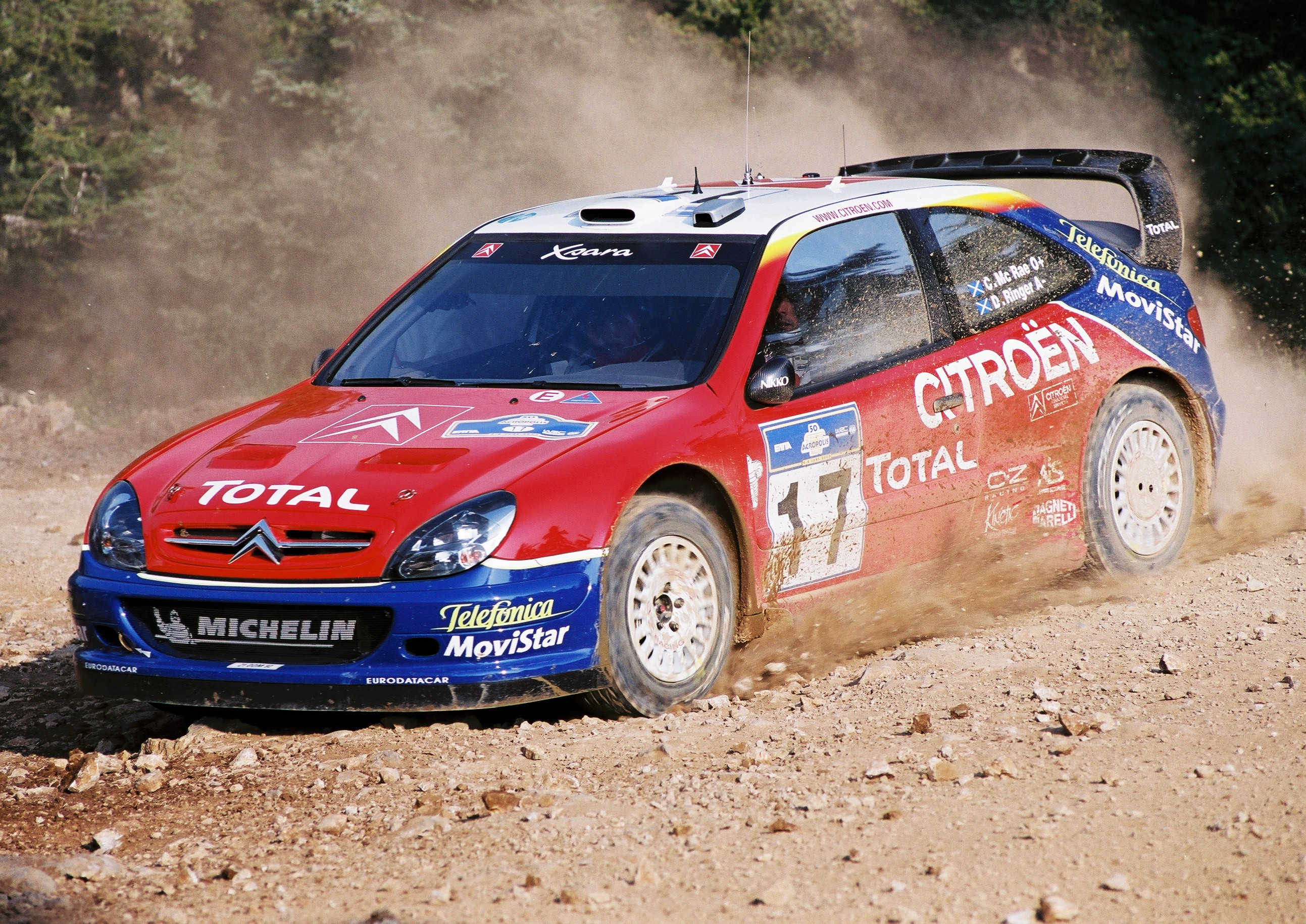
- Category: World Rally Car
- Constructor: Citroën Racing
- Designer: Jean-Claude Vaucard
- Predecessor: Citroën Xsara Kit Car
- Successor: Citroën C4 WRC

Technical specifications
- Length: 4,167 mm (164.1 in)
- Width: 1,770 mm (69.7 in)
- Height: 1,390 mm (54.7 in)
- Axle track: 1,568 mm (61.7 in)
- Wheelbase: 2,555 mm (100.6 in)
- Engine: PSA XU7JP4 2.0 L (122 cu in) I4 turbocharged front-engine, all-wheel-drive
- Transmission: Six-speed sequential 4-wheel drive
- Power: 315 brake horsepower (235 kW) @ 5,500 rpm 569 newton-metres (420 lbf⋅ft) @ 2,750 rpm
- Weight: 1,230 kg (2,711.7 lb)
- Lubricants: Total
- Tyres: Michelin; BFGoodrich

Competition history (WRC)
- Notable entrants: (France) Citroën; (Belgium) Kronos Citroën; (Norway) Petter Solberg
- Notable drivers: (France) Philippe Bugalski; (Belgium) François Duval; (France) Sébastien Loeb; (United Kingdom) Colin McRae; (Spain) Xavier Pons; (Spain) Jesús Puras; (Sweden) Thomas Rådström; (Spain) Carlos Sainz; (Norway) Petter Solberg; (Spain) Dani Sordo
- Debut: (Spain) 2001 Rally Catalunya
- First win: (France) 2001 Tour de Corse
- Last win: 2006 Cyprus Rally
- Last event: 2010 Rallye de France
Races	Wins	Podiums	Titles
58	32	78	6
- Constructors' Championships: 3 (2003, 2004, 2005)
- Drivers' Championships: 3 (2004, 2005, 2006)

The Citroën Xsara WRC is a World Rally Car built for the Citroën World Rally Team by Citroën Racing to compete in the World Rally Championship. It is based on the Citroën Xsara road car. The car was introduced for the 2001 World Rally Championship season and has taken the first three of nine drivers' titles for Sébastien Loeb, as well as the manufacturers' title in 2003, 2004, and 2005.

== Competition history ==
=== World Rally Championship ===
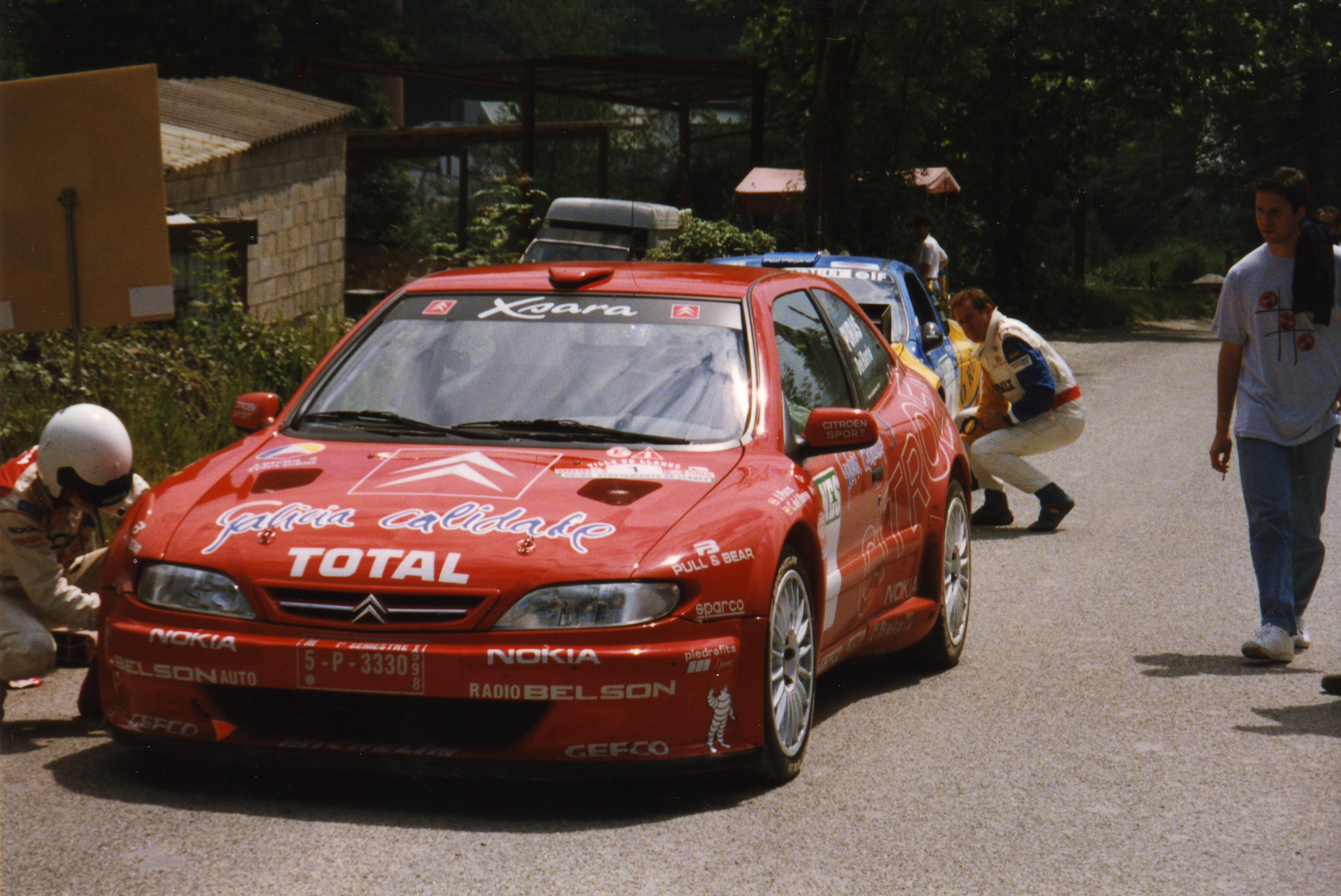
Jesús Puras with a Citroën Xsara Kit Car

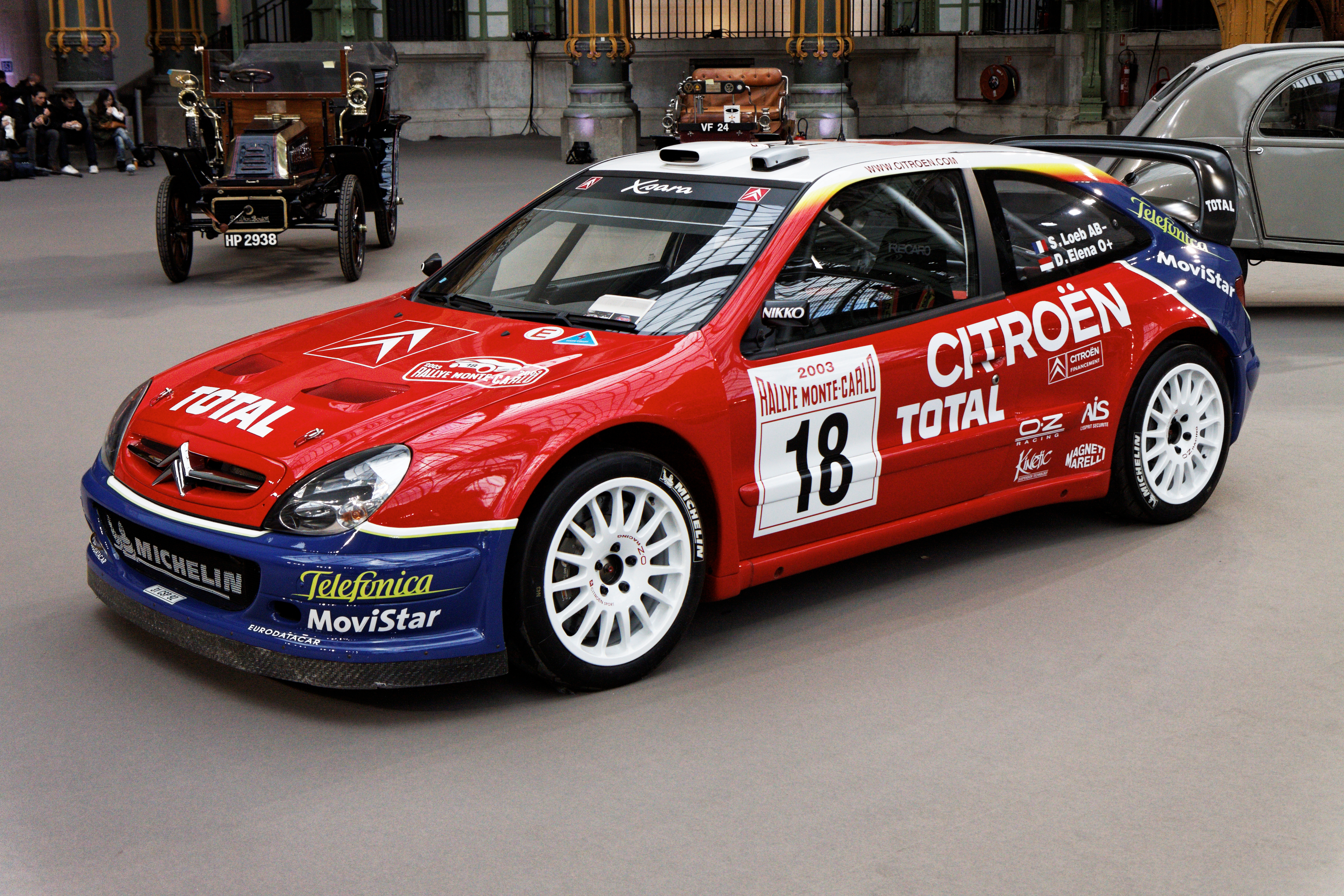
Citroen Xsara WRC

The Xsara World Rally Car, based on the road going Xsara hatchback but ultimately having very little resemblance to it under the skin, was one of the most successful cars ever to compete in the World Rally Championship. In 1999, the WRCs predecessor, the two wheel drive naturally aspirated Citroën Xsara Kit Car, won overall in Rallye Catalunya and Tour de Corse. This car was considered the best car in the class. The FIA decided to increase the minimum weight of the cars for the 2000 season, making the car un-competitive against World Rally Car machinery. In 2001, the Kit Cars category was discontinued and was replaced by the Super 1600 and Super 2000.

In 2002, the Citroën Xsara WRC was introduced at the 2002 Monte Carlo Rally, with French driver Sébastien Loeb losing out on victory after being penalized for an illegal tyre change. Loeb subsequently won the Rallye Deutschland.

In 2003, Citroën partook in their first full championship season, with Loeb joined by former champions Colin McRae and Carlos Sainz. The Xsara was more competitive, winning four rallies, and both Loeb and Sainz went into the final round of the season, the Wales Rally GB, with a chance at winning the drivers title. After championship rival Richard Burns suffered a blackout and withdrew from the rally, and Sainz crashed out on day one, Citroën chose to prioritise winning the manufacturers' title, which they did by 15 points. Loeb finished the rally in second and lost the drivers title by one point to Petter Solberg. In 2004, Loeb won his first drivers championship and successfully defended his title in 2005, winning a record ten rallies in a single season.

Sébastien Loeb won 28 rallies with the car, three consecutive Driver's Championship titles from 2004 to 2006, and led Citroën to three consecutive Manufacturer's Championship titles in 2003, 2004, and 2005. In addition to Leob piloting the Xsara WRC, Jesús Puras, Carlos Sainz, and François Duval also won rallies in the Xsara during its time as the factory-supported rally car.

The car was replaced in 2007 by the Citroën C4 WRC, however the Xsara was still used by privateers. 2003 WRC World Champion Petter Solberg drove a 2006 spec Xsara for the majority of the 2009 season, under the banner of his own Petter Solberg World Rally Team.

=== Rallycross ===
Kenneth Hansen won the FIA European Rallycross Championship every year from 2000 to 2005 in the Xsara.

In September 2014, French based Lebanese businessman Nabil Karam entered the 2014 World RX of France with an Xsara, finishing 34th out of 37 entrants after the qualifying heats, and failing to qualify for the semi-finals. Having upgraded to a DS3 for the edition of 2015, this was the only time an Xsara appeared in an FIA World Rallycross Championship event.

== WRC victories ==
#	Event	Season	Driver	Co-driver
1	(France) 2001 Tour de Corse	2001	(Spain) Jesús Puras	(Spain) Marc Martí
2	(Germany) 2002 Rallye Deutschland	2002	(France) Sébastien Loeb	(Monaco) Daniel Elena
3	(Monaco) 2003 Monte Carlo Rally	2003	(France) Sébastien Loeb	(Monaco) Daniel Elena
4	2003 Rally of Turkey	2003	(Spain) Carlos Sainz	(Spain) Marc Martí
5	(Germany) 2003 Rallye Deutschland	2003	(France) Sébastien Loeb	(Monaco) Daniel Elena
6	(Italy) 2003 Rallye Sanremo	2003	(France) Sébastien Loeb	(Monaco) Daniel Elena
7	(Monaco) 2004 Monte Carlo Rally	2004	(France) Sébastien Loeb	(Monaco) Daniel Elena
8	(Sweden) 2004 Swedish Rally	2004	(France) Sébastien Loeb	(Monaco) Daniel Elena
9	2004 Cyprus Rally	2004	(France) Sébastien Loeb	(Monaco) Daniel Elena
10	2004 Rally of Turkey	2004	(France) Sébastien Loeb	(Monaco) Daniel Elena
11	2004 Rally Argentina	2004	(Spain) Carlos Sainz	(Spain) Marc Martí
12	(Germany) 2004 Rallye Deutschland	2004	(France) Sébastien Loeb	(Monaco) Daniel Elena
13	2004 Rally Australia	2004	(France) Sébastien Loeb	(Monaco) Daniel Elena
14	(Monaco) 2005 Monte Carlo Rally	2005	(France) Sébastien Loeb	(Monaco) Daniel Elena
15	2005 Rally New Zealand	2005	(France) Sébastien Loeb	(Monaco) Daniel Elena
16	(Italy) 2005 Rally d'Italia Sardegna	2005	(France) Sébastien Loeb	(Monaco) Daniel Elena
17	2005 Cyprus Rally	2005	(France) Sébastien Loeb	(Monaco) Daniel Elena
18	2005 Rally of Turkey	2005	(France) Sébastien Loeb	(Monaco) Daniel Elena
19	(Greece) 2005 Acropolis Rally	2005	(France) Sébastien Loeb	(Monaco) Daniel Elena
20	2005 Rally Argentina	2005	(France) Sébastien Loeb	(Monaco) Daniel Elena
21	(Germany) 2005 Rallye Deutschland	2005	(France) Sébastien Loeb	(Monaco) Daniel Elena
22	(France) 2005 Tour de Corse	2005	(France) Sébastien Loeb	(Monaco) Daniel Elena
23	(Spain) 2005 Rally Catalunya	2005	(France) Sébastien Loeb	(Monaco) Daniel Elena
24	2005 Rally Australia	2005	(Belgium) François Duval	(Belgium) Sven Smeets
25	2006 Rally Mexico	2006	(France) Sébastien Loeb	(Monaco) Daniel Elena
26	(Spain) 2006 Rally Catalunya	2006	(France) Sébastien Loeb	(Monaco) Daniel Elena
27	(France) 2006 Tour de Corse	2006	(France) Sébastien Loeb	(Monaco) Daniel Elena
28	2006 Rally Argentina	2006	(France) Sébastien Loeb	(Monaco) Daniel Elena
29	(Italy) 2006 Rally d'Italia Sardegna	2006	(France) Sébastien Loeb	(Monaco) Daniel Elena
30	(Germany) 2006 Rallye Deutschland	2006	(France) Sébastien Loeb	(Monaco) Daniel Elena
31	2006 Rally Japan	2006	(France) Sébastien Loeb	(Monaco) Daniel Elena
32	2006 Cyprus Rally	2006	(France) Sébastien Loeb	(Monaco) Daniel Elena

== WRC results ==
Year	Driver	1	2	3	4	5	6	7	8	9	10	11	12	13	14	15	16	WDC	Points	WMC	Points
Citroën World Rally Team
2001	(France) Philippe Bugalski	MON	SWE	POR	ESP; 8	ARG	CYP	GRC; 6	KEN	FIN	NZL	ITA; Ret	FRA; Ret	AUS	GBR			22nd	1	–	–
2001	(Spain) Jesús Puras	MON	SWE	POR	ESP; Ret	ARG	CYP					ITA; Ret	FRA; 1	AUS	GBR			11th	10	–	–
2001	(Sweden) Thomas Rådström							GRC; Ret	KEN	FIN	NZL							15th	6	–	–
2001	(France) Sébastien Loeb	MON	SWE	POR	ESP	ARG	CYP	GRC	KEN	FIN	NZL	ITA; 2	FRA	AUS	GBR			14th	6	–	–
2002	(Sweden) Thomas Rådström	MON; Ret	SWE; 37	FRA	ESP; Ret	CYP	ARG	GRE; 8	KEN; 3	FIN; Ret			NZL	AUS	GBR; Ret			12th	4	–	–
2002	(Spain) Jesús Puras										GER; Ret	ITA; 6						19th	1	–	–
2002	(France) Sébastien Loeb	MON; 2	SWE; 17	FRA	ESP; Ret	CYP	ARG	GRE; 7	KEN; 5	FIN; 10	GER; 1	ITA	NZL	AUS; 7	GBR; Ret			10th	18	–	–
2002	(France) Philippe Bugalski	MON; Ret	SWE	FRA; 4	ESP; 3	CYP	ARG	GRE	KEN	FIN	GER; Ret	ITA; Ret	NZL	AUS	GBR			11th	7	–	–
2002	(Spain) Jesús Puras	MON	SWE	FRA	ESP; 12	CYP	ARG	GRE	KEN	FIN			NZL	AUS	GBR			19th	1	–	–
2003	(United Kingdom) Colin McRae	MON; 2	SWE; 5	TUR; 4	NZL; Ret	ARG; Ret	GRC; 8	CYP; 4	GER; 4	FIN; Ret	AUS; 4	ITA; 6	FRA; 5	ESP; 9	GBR; 4			7th	45	1st	160
2003	(France) Sébastien Loeb	MON; 1	SWE; 7	TUR; Ret	NZL; 4	ARG; Ret	GRE; Ret	CYP; 3	GER; 1	FIN; 5	AUS; 2	ITA; 1	FRA; 13	ESP; 2	GBR; 2			2nd	71	1st	160
2003	(Spain) Carlos Sainz	MON; 3	SWE; 9	TUR; 1	NZL; 12	ARG; 2	GRC; 2	CYP; 5	GER; 6	FIN; 4	AUS; 5	ITA; 4	FRA; 2	ESP; 7	GBR; Ret			3rd	63	1st	160
2003	(France) Philippe Bugalski	MON	SWE	TUR	NZL	ARG	GRC	CYP	GER; Ret	FIN	AUS	ITA; 8	FRA; 9	ESP; 10	GBR			23rd	1	1st	160
2004	(France) Sébastien Loeb	MON; 1	SWE; 1	MEX; Ret	NZL; 4	CYP; 1	GRE; 2	TUR; 1	ARG; 2	FIN; 4	GER; 1	JPN; 2	GBR; 2	ITA; 2	FRA; 2	ESP; Ret	AUS; 1	1st	118	1st	194
2004	(Spain) Carlos Sainz	MON; Ret	SWE; 5	MEX; 3	NZL; 6	CYP; 3	GRC; 19	TUR; 4	ARG; 1	FIN; 3	GER; 3	JPN; 5	GBR; 4	ITA; 3	FRA; 3	ESP; 3	AUS; WD	4th	73	1st	194
2005	(France) Sébastien Loeb	MON; 1	SWE; Ret	MEX; 4	NZL; 1	ITA; 1	CYP; 1	TUR; 1	GRE; 1	ARG; 1	FIN; 2	GER; 1	GBR; 3	JPN; 2	FRA; 1	ESP; 1	AUS; Ret	1st	127	1st	188
2005	(Belgium) François Duval	MON; Ret	SWE; 12	MEX; Ret	NZL; 4	ITA; 11	CYP; Ret			ARG; 7	FIN; 8	GER; 2	GBR; 2	JPN; 4	FRA; Ret	ESP; 2	AUS; 1	6th	47	1st	188
2005	(Spain) Carlos Sainz							TUR; 4	GRC; 3									13th	11	1st	188
Kronos Citroën World Rally Team
2006	(France) Sébastien Loeb	MON; 2	SWE; 2	MEX; 1	ESP; 1	FRA; 1	ARG; 1	ITA; 1	GRE; 2	DEU; 1	FIN; 2	JPN; 1	CYP; 1					1st	112	2nd	166
2006	(United Kingdom) Colin McRae													TUR; Ret				–	0	2nd	166
2006	(Spain) Xavier Pons	MON; 9	SWE; 7	MEX; Ret	ESP; Ret	FRA; 6	ARG; 17	ITA; 4	GRE; 8	DEU; 14	FIN; Ret	JPN; DNS	CYP; 7	TUR; 4	AUS; 4	NZL; 4	GBR; 5	7th	32	2nd	166
2006	(Spain) Dani Sordo	MON; 8	SWE; 16	MEX; 4	ESP; 2	FRA; 3	ARG; 5	ITA; 3	GRE; 6	DEU; 2	FIN; Ret	JPN; DSQ	CYP; Ret	TUR; 7	AUS; 23	NZL; 5	GBR; 7	5th	49	2nd	166
Petter Solberg World Rally Team
2009	(Norway) Petter Solberg	IRL	NOR; 6	CYP; 3	POR; 4	ARG; Ret	ITA; 3	GRC; Ret	POL; 4	FIN; Ret	AUS	ESP	GBR					5th	35	–	–
2010	(France) Yvan Muller	SWE	MEX	JOR	TUR	NZL	POR	BUL	FIN	GER	JPN	FRA; 42	ESP	GBR				–	0	–	–

Awards
Preceded by Peugeot 206 WRC	Autosport; Rally Car of the Year; 2003, 2004, 2005	Succeeded by Ford Focus RS WRC
