= 2001 Tour de Corse =

12th round of the 2001 World Rally Championship

2001 Tour de Corse 45th Tour de Corse - Rallye de France
Round 12 of the 2001 World Rally Championship season
← Previous event	Next event →
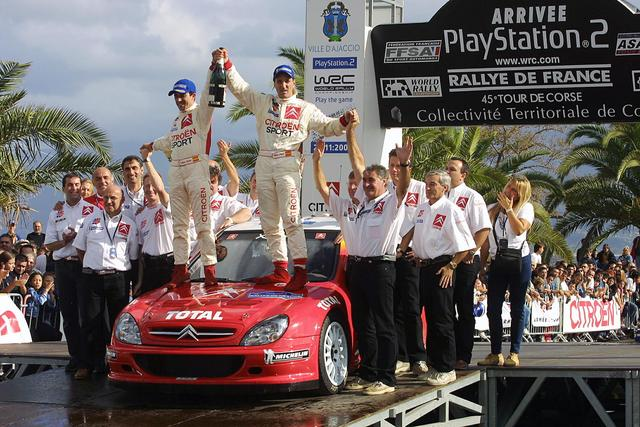
- Jesús Puras (right) and Marc Martí (left) celebrating their victory.
- Host country: France
- Rally base: Ajaccio
- Dates run: October 19, 2001 – October 21, 2001
- Stages: 16 (394.04 km; 244.85 miles)
- Stage surface: Asphalt
- Overall distance: 903.50 km (561.41 miles)

Statistics
- Crews: 85 at start, 50 at finish

Overall results
- Overall winner: (Spain) Jesús Puras (Spain) Marc Martí (France) Automobiles Citroën; Citroën Xsara WRC

The 2001 Tour de Corse (formally the 45th Tour de Corse - Rallye de France) was the twelfth round of the 2001 World Rally Championship. The race was held over three days between 19 October and 21 October 2001, and was won by Citroën's Jesús Puras, his 1st win in the World Rally Championship.

== Background ==
=== Entry list ===
No.	Driver	Co-Driver	Entrant	Car	Tyre
World Rally Championship manufacturer entries
2	(France) Didier Auriol	(France) Denis Giraudet	(France) Peugeot Total	Peugeot 206 WRC	MI
3	(Spain) Carlos Sainz	(Spain) Luis Moya	(United Kingdom) Ford Motor Co. Ltd.	Ford Focus RS WRC '01	P
4	(United Kingdom) Colin McRae	(United Kingdom) Nicky Grist	(United Kingdom) Ford Motor Co. Ltd.	Ford Focus RS WRC '01	P
5	(United Kingdom) Richard Burns	(United Kingdom) Robert Reid	(Japan) Subaru World Rally Team	Subaru Impreza S7 WRC '01	P
6	(Norway) Petter Solberg	(United Kingdom) Phil Mills	(Japan) Subaru World Rally Team	Subaru Impreza S7 WRC '01	P
7	(Finland) Tommi Mäkinen	(Finland) Risto Mannisenmäki	(Japan) Marlboro Mitsubishi Ralliart	Mitsubishi Lancer WRC	MI
8	(Belgium) Freddy Loix	(Belgium) Sven Smeets	(Japan) Marlboro Mitsubishi Ralliart	Mitsubishi Lancer WRC	MI
9	(Italy) Piero Liatti	(Italy) Carlo Cassina	(South Korea) Hyundai Castrol World Rally Team	Hyundai Accent WRC2	MI
10	(United Kingdom) Alister McRae	(United Kingdom) David Senior	(South Korea) Hyundai Castrol World Rally Team	Hyundai Accent WRC2	MI
11	(Germany) Armin Schwarz	(Germany) Manfred Hiemer	(Czech Republic) Škoda Motorsport	Škoda Octavia WRC Evo2	MI
12	(Belgium) Bruno Thiry	(Belgium) Stéphane Prévot	(Czech Republic) Škoda Motorsport	Škoda Octavia WRC Evo2	MI
16	(France) Gilles Panizzi	(France) Hervé Panizzi	(France) Peugeot Total	Peugeot 206 WRC	MI
World Rally Championship entries
1	(Finland) Marcus Grönholm	(Finland) Timo Rautiainen	(France) Peugeot Total	Peugeot 206 WRC	MI
14	(France) Philippe Bugalski	(France) Jean-Paul Chiaroni	(France) Automobiles Citroën	Citroën Xsara WRC	MI
15	(Spain) Jesús Puras	(Spain) Marc Martí	(France) Automobiles Citroën	Citroën Xsara WRC	MI
17	(France) François Delecour	(France) Daniel Grataloup	(United Kingdom) Ford Motor Co. Ltd.	Ford Focus RS WRC '01	P
18	(Estonia) Markko Märtin	(United Kingdom) Michael Park	(Japan) Subaru World Rally Team	Subaru Impreza S7 WRC '01	P
24	(Japan) Toshihiro Arai	(Australia) Glenn Macneall	(Japan) Subaru World Rally Team	Subaru Impreza S7 WRC '01	P
25	(Austria) Achim Mörtl	(Austria) Stefan Eichhorner	(Austria) Promotor World Rally Team	Subaru Impreza S7 WRC '01	P
29	(Finland) Harri Rovanperä	(Finland) Risto Pietiläinen	(France) H.F. Grifone SRL	Peugeot 206 WRC	MI
36	(France) Armando Pereira	(France) Jean-Jacques Ferrero	(France) Armando Pereira	Subaru Impreza S5 WRC '99	MI
37	(France) Jean-Claude Torre	(France) Patrick de la Foata	(France) Jean-Claude Torre	Subaru Impreza S5 WRC '98	MI
38	(United Kingdom) Neil Wearden	(United Kingdom) Trevor Agnew	(United Kingdom) Neil Wearden	Peugeot 206 WRC	MI
Group N Cup entries
28	(Uruguay) Gustavo Trelles	(Argentina) Jorge Del Buono	(Uruguay) Gustavo Trelles	Mitsubishi Lancer Evo VI	P
39	(France) Jean-Pierre Manzagol	(France) Sabrina De Castelli	(France) Jean-Pierre Manzagol	Mitsubishi Lancer Evo V	MI
40	(France) Jean-Marie Santoni	(France) Jean-Marc Casamatta	(France) Jean-Marie Santoni	Mitsubishi Lancer Evo VI	—N/a
41	(France) Jean-Marc Sanchez	(France) Jean-François Scelo	(France) Jean-Marc Sanchez	Mitsubishi Lancer Evo VI	P
43	(Italy) Giovanni Manfrinato	(Italy) Claudio Condotta	(Italy) Giovanni Manfrinato	Mitsubishi Lancer Evo VII	P
44	(Belgium) Bob Colsoul	(Belgium) Tom Colsoul	(Belgium) Bob Colsoul	Mitsubishi Lancer Evo VI	MI
45	(Italy) Marta Candian	(Italy) Mara Biotti	(Italy) Marta Candian	Mitsubishi Lancer Evo VI	P
46	(New Zealand) Reece Jones	(New Zealand) Garry Cowan	(New Zealand) Reece Jones	Mitsubishi Lancer Evo VI	FAL
47	(France) Jean-Paul Aymé	(France) Brigitte Aymé	(France) Jean-Paul Aymé	Mitsubishi Lancer Evo VI	MI
48	(Russia) Stanislav Gryazin	(Russia) Dmitriy Eremeev	(Russia) Stanislav Gryazin	Mitsubishi Lancer Evo VI	MI
49	(United Kingdom) Nik Elsmore	(United Kingdom) Jayson Brown	(United Kingdom) Nik Elsmore	Mitsubishi Lancer Evo VI	MI
74	(Italy) Norberto Cangani	(Italy) Eros Di Prima	(Italy) Norberto Cangani	Mitsubishi Lancer Evo VI	P
75	(Italy) Fabrizio Mari	(Italy) Alessandro Leonardi	(Italy) Fabrizio Mari	Mitsubishi Lancer Evo VI	—N/a
81	(France) François Faggianelli	(France) Jean-Dominique Mattei	(France) François Faggianelli	Renault Clio RS	—N/a
82	(France) Richard Bourcier	(France) Jean-Marc Ducousso	(France) Richard Bourcier	Renault Clio RS	—N/a
83	(France) Eddie Mercier	(France) Jean-Michel Veret	(France) Eddie Mercier	Renault Clio RS	MI
84	(France) Jean-Jacques Padovani	(France) Guy Voillemier	(France) Jean-Jacques Padovani	Renault Clio RS	P
85	(France) Jean-Michel Pietri	(France) Bruno Bouvier	(France) Jean-Michel Pietri	Peugeot 306 S16	P
87	(France) Patrick Pugliese	(France) Franck Giambi	(France) Patrick Pugliese	Peugeot 306 S16	—N/a
88	(France) Stéphane Rovina	(France) Philippe Rovina	(France) Stéphane Rovina	Peugeot 306 Rallye	P
89	(France) Yves Laurence	(France) Pascal Guinchard	(France) Yves Laurence	Peugeot 306 S16	—N/a
90	(France) Jean-François Prévalet	(France) Philippe Viennet	(France) Jean-François Prévalet	Peugeot 306 S16	P
91	(France) Eric Filippi	(France) Guy Mizael	(France) Eric Filippi	Peugeot 306 S16	MI
92	(France) Henri-Marc Venturini	(France) Jean Vincensini	(France) Henri-Marc Venturini	Renault Clio Williams	MI
93	(France) Antoine Paul Bastelica	(France) Antoine Felix Paolini	(France) Antoine Paul Bastelica	Renault Clio Williams	MI
95	(Italy) Walter Lamonato	(Italy) Simone Scattolin	(Italy) Walter Lamonato	Opel Astra OPC	MI
96	(France) Thierry Chkondali	(France) Sébastien Raviot	(France) Thierry Chkondali	Honda Integra Type-R	B
100	(France) Thierry Dard	(France) Jean Philippe du Fayet de la Tour	(France) Thierry Dard	Honda Civic VTi	MI
101	(France) Jean-Marc Poisson	(France) Olivier Lesigne	(France) Jean-Marc Poisson	Honda Civic VTi	—N/a
102	(Belgium) Michel Wilders	(Belgium) Danielle Wilders-Arend	(Belgium) Michel Wilders	Honda Civic VTi	—N/a
103	(France) Eric Cascio	(France) Sylvia Cascio	(France) Eric Cascio	Peugeot 106 XSI	—N/a
104	(France) Hervé Tomaselli	(France) Pierre-Antoine Bonifet	(France) Hervé Tomaselli	Peugeot 106 XSI	MI
Super 1600 Cup entries
50	(Austria) Manfred Stohl	(Austria) Ilka Minor	(Italy) Top Run SRL	Fiat Punto S1600	MI
52	(Italy) Andrea Dallavilla	(Italy) Giovanni Bernacchini	(Italy) R&D Motorsport	Fiat Punto S1600	MI
53	(France) Sébastien Loeb	(Monaco) Daniel Elena	(France) Citroën Sport	Citroën Saxo S1600	MI
54	(Belgium) Larry Cols	(Belgium) Yasmine Gerard	(Belgium) Peugeot Bastos Racing	Peugeot 206 S1600	MI
55	(United Kingdom) Niall McShea	(United Kingdom) Michael Orr	(France) Citroën Sport	Citroën Saxo S1600	MI
56	(Italy) Giandomenico Basso	(Italy) Flavio Guglielmini	(Italy) Top Run SRL	Fiat Punto S1600	MI
57	(France) Cédric Robert	(France) Marie-Pierre Billoux	(France) Team Gamma	Peugeot 206 S1600	MI
58	(Spain) Sergio Vallejo	(Spain) Diego Vallejo	(Spain) Pronto Racing	Fiat Punto S1600	MI
59	(France) Benoît Rousselot	(France) Gilles Mondésir	(United Kingdom) Ford Motor Co. Ltd.	Ford Puma S1600	MI
61	(Italy) Corrado Fontana	(Italy) Renzo Casazza	(Italy) H.F. Grifone SRL	Peugeot 206 S1600	MI
62	(Finland) Jussi Välimäki	(Finland) Jakke Honkanen	(Finland) ST Motors	Peugeot 206 S1600	MI
63	(Norway) Martin Stenshorne	(United Kingdom) Clive Jenkins	(Norway) Zeta Racing	Ford Puma S1600	MI
64	(Italy) Massimo Macaluso	(Italy) Antonio Celot	(Italy) R&D Motorsport	Fiat Punto S1600	MI
65	(Paraguay) Alejandro Galanti	(Spain) Xavier Amigó	(Italy) Astra Racing	Ford Puma S1600	MI
67	(Andorra) Albert Llovera	(Spain) Marc Corral	(Spain) Pronto Racing	Fiat Punto S1600	MI
68	(Italy) Massimo Ceccato	(Italy) Mitia Dotta	(Italy) Hawk Racing Club	Fiat Punto S1600	MI
69	(France) Nicolas Bernardi	(France) Delphine Bernardi	(France) Team Gamma	Peugeot 206 S1600	MI
71	(Belgium) François Duval	(Belgium) Jean-Marc Fortin	(United Kingdom) Ford Motor Co. Ltd.	Ford Puma S1600	MI
72	(Malaysia) Saladin Mazlan	(United Kingdom) Timothy Sturla	(Malaysia) Saladin Rallying	Ford Puma S1600	MI
73	(Italy) Christian Chemin	(Italy) Matteo Alberto Bacchin	(Italy) Hawk Racing Club	Fiat Punto S1600	MI

=== Itinerary ===
All dates and times are CEST (UTC+2).

Date	Time	No.	Stage name	Distance
Leg 1 — 126.81 km
19 October	08:56	SS1	Cuttoli — Peri 1	17.40 km
19 October	09:44	SS2	Ocana — Radicale 1	27.64 km
19 October	11:46	SS3	Ste Marie Sicche — Petreto 1	36.73 km
19 October	14:04	SS4	Cuttoli — Peri 2	17.40 km
19 October	14:52	SS5	Ocana — Radicale 2	27.64 km
Leg 2 — 155.55 km
20 October	09:15	SS6	Ste Marie Sicche — Petreto 2	36.73 km
20 October	11:40	SS7	Gare de Carbuccia — Gare d'Ucciani 1	11.02 km
20 October	12:05	SS8	Vero — Pont d'Azzana 2	18.28 km
20 October	12:40	SS9	Lopigna — Sarrola 1	30.11 km
20 October	14:31	SS10	Gare de Carbuccia — Gare d'Ucciani 2	11.02 km
20 October	14:57	SS11	Vero — Pont d'Azzana 2	18.28 km
20 October	15:32	SS12	Lopigna — Sarrola 2	30.11 km
Leg 3 — 111.68 km
21 October	09:59	SS13	Penitencier Coti Chiavari — Pietra Rossa 1	24.05 km
21 October	10:35	SS14	Pont de Calzola — Agosta Plage 1	31.79 km
21 October	12:37	SS15	Penitencier Coti Chiavari — Pietra Rossa 2	24.05 km
21 October	13:13	SS16	Pont de Calzola — Agosta Plage 2	31.79 km

== Results ==
=== Overall ===
Pos.	No.	Driver	Co-driver	Team	Car	Time	Difference	Points
1	15	(Spain) Jesús Puras	(Spain) Marc Martí	(France) Automobiles Citroën	Citroën Xsara WRC	3:58:35.5		10
2	16	(France) Gilles Panizzi	(France) Hervé Panizzi	(France) Peugeot Total	Peugeot 206 WRC	3:58:53.0	+17.5	6
3	2	(France) Didier Auriol	(France) Denis Giraudet	(France) Peugeot Total	Peugeot 206 WRC	3:59:47.4	+1:11.9	4
4	5	(United Kingdom) Richard Burns	(United Kingdom) Robert Reid	(Japan) Subaru World Rally Team	Subaru Impreza S7 WRC '01	4:03:28.6	+4:53.1	3
5	6	(Norway) Petter Solberg	(United Kingdom) Phil Mills	(Japan) Subaru World Rally Team	Subaru Impreza S7 WRC '01	4:03:29.4	+4:53.9	2
6	18	(Estonia) Markko Märtin	(United Kingdom) Michael Park	(Japan) Subaru World Rally Team	Subaru Impreza S7 WRC '01	4:03:57.1	+5:21.6	1

=== World Rally Cars ===
==== Classification ====
Position		No.	Driver	Co-driver	Entrant	Car	Time	Difference	Points
Event	Class	No.	Driver	Co-driver	Entrant	Car	Time	Difference	Points
2	1	16	(France) Gilles Panizzi	(France) Hervé Panizzi	(France) Peugeot Total	Peugeot 206 WRC	3:58:53.0		6
3	2	2	(France) Didier Auriol	(France) Denis Giraudet	(France) Peugeot Total	Peugeot 206 WRC	3:59:47.4	+54.4	4
4	3	5	(United Kingdom) Richard Burns	(United Kingdom) Robert Reid	(Japan) Subaru World Rally Team	Subaru Impreza S7 WRC '01	4:03:28.6	+4:35.6	3
5	4	6	(Norway) Petter Solberg	(United Kingdom) Phil Mills	(Japan) Subaru World Rally Team	Subaru Impreza S7 WRC '01	4:03:29.4	+4:36.4	2
8	5	9	(Italy) Piero Liatti	(Italy) Carlo Cassina	(South Korea) Hyundai Castrol World Rally Team	Hyundai Accent WRC2	4:06:44.7	+7:51.7	0
9	6	10	(United Kingdom) Alister McRae	(United Kingdom) David Senior	(South Korea) Hyundai Castrol World Rally Team	Hyundai Accent WRC2	4:07:28.2	+8:35.2	0
11	7	4	(United Kingdom) Colin McRae	(United Kingdom) Nicky Grist	(United Kingdom) Ford Motor Co. Ltd.	Ford Focus RS WRC '01	4:08:56.8	+10:03.8	0
12	8	8	(Belgium) Freddy Loix	(Belgium) Sven Smeets	(Japan) Marlboro Mitsubishi Ralliart	Mitsubishi Lancer WRC	4:11:50.2	+12:57.2	0
Retired SS9		11	(Germany) Armin Schwarz	(Germany) Manfred Hiemer	(Czech Republic) Škoda Motorsport	Škoda Octavia WRC Evo2	Mechanical		0
Retired SS6		12	(Belgium) Bruno Thiry	(Belgium) Stéphane Prévot	(Czech Republic) Škoda Motorsport	Škoda Octavia WRC Evo2	Transmission		0
Retired SS5		7	(Finland) Tommi Mäkinen	(Finland) Risto Mannisenmäki	(Japan) Marlboro Mitsubishi Ralliart	Mitsubishi Lancer WRC	Accident		0
Retired SS3		3	(Spain) Carlos Sainz	(Spain) Luis Moya	(United Kingdom) Ford Motor Co. Ltd.	Ford Focus RS WRC '01	Oil pressure		0

==== Special stages ====
Day	Stage	Stage name	Length	Winner	Car	Time	Class leaders
Leg 1 (19 Oct)	SS1	Cuttoli — Peri 1	17.40 km	(France) Gilles Panizzi	Peugeot 206 WRC	11:24.6	(France) Gilles Panizzi
Leg 1 (19 Oct)	SS2	Ocana — Radicale 1	27.64 km	(Spain) Jesús Puras	Citroën Xsara WRC	17:17.5	(Spain) Jesús Puras
Leg 1 (19 Oct)	SS3	Ste Marie Sicche — Petreto 1	36.73 km	(Spain) Jesús Puras	Citroën Xsara WRC	23:49.7	(Spain) Jesús Puras
Leg 1 (19 Oct)	SS4	Cuttoli — Peri 2	17.40 km	(France) Gilles Panizzi	Peugeot 206 WRC	11:21.8	(Spain) Jesús Puras
Leg 1 (19 Oct)	SS5	Ocana — Radicale 2	27.64 km	Stage cancelled			(Spain) Jesús Puras
Leg 2 (20 Oct)	SS6	Ste Marie Sicche — Petreto 2	36.73 km	(Spain) Jesús Puras	Citroën Xsara WRC	23:38.2	(Spain) Jesús Puras
Leg 2 (20 Oct)	SS7	Gare de Carbuccia — Gare d'Ucciani 1	11.02 km	(France) Gilles Panizzi	Peugeot 206 WRC	7:14.3	(Spain) Jesús Puras
Leg 2 (20 Oct)	SS8	Vero — Pont d'Azzana 2	18.28 km	(United Kingdom) Colin McRae	Ford Focus RS WRC '01	13:06.0	(Spain) Jesús Puras
Leg 2 (20 Oct)	SS9	Lopigna — Sarrola 1	30.11 km	(Spain) Jesús Puras	Citroën Xsara WRC	19:33.8	(Spain) Jesús Puras
Leg 2 (20 Oct)	SS10	Gare de Carbuccia — Gare d'Ucciani 2	11.02 km	(Spain) Jesús Puras (France) Gilles Panizzi	Citroën Xsara WRC; Peugeot 206 WRC	7:17.8	(Spain) Jesús Puras
Leg 2 (20 Oct)	SS11	Vero — Pont d'Azzana 2	18.28 km	(Spain) Jesús Puras	Citroën Xsara WRC	12:48.1	(Spain) Jesús Puras
Leg 2 (20 Oct)	SS12	Lopigna — Sarrola 2	30.11 km	(Spain) Jesús Puras	Citroën Xsara WRC	19:23.4	(Spain) Jesús Puras
Leg 3 (21 Oct)	SS13	Penitencier Coti Chiavari — Pietra Rossa 1	24.05 km	(France) Gilles Panizzi	Peugeot 206 WRC	15:10.6	(Spain) Jesús Puras
Leg 3 (21 Oct)	SS14	Pont de Calzola — Agosta Plage 1	31.79 km	(Spain) Jesús Puras	Citroën Xsara WRC	19:10.4	(Spain) Jesús Puras
Leg 3 (21 Oct)	SS15	Penitencier Coti Chiavari — Pietra Rossa 2	24.05 km	(France) Gilles Panizzi	Peugeot 206 WRC	15:08.2	(Spain) Jesús Puras
Leg 3 (21 Oct)	SS16	Pont de Calzola — Agosta Plage 2	31.79 km	(United Kingdom) Richard Burns	Subaru Impreza S7 WRC '01	20:32.8	(Spain) Jesús Puras

==== Championship standings ====
Pos.	Drivers' championships			Co-drivers' championships			Manufacturers' championships		
Pos.	Move	Driver	Points	Move	Co-driver	Points	Move	Manufacturer	Points
1		(United Kingdom) Colin McRae	40		(United Kingdom) Nicky Grist	40		(United Kingdom) Ford Motor Co. Ltd.	83
2		(Finland) Tommi Mäkinen	40		(Finland) Risto Mannisenmäki	40	1	(France) Peugeot Total	76
3	1	(United Kingdom) Richard Burns	34	1	(United Kingdom) Robert Reid	34	1	(Japan) Marlboro Mitsubishi Ralliart	67
4	1	(Spain) Carlos Sainz	33	1	(Spain) Luis Moya	33		(Japan) Subaru World Rally Team	55
5		(Finland) Harri Rovanperä	27		(Finland) Risto Pietiläinen	27		(Czech Republic) Škoda Motorsport	15

=== FIA Cup for Production Rally Drivers ===
==== Classification ====
Position		No.	Driver	Co-driver	Entrant	Car	Time	Difference	Points
Event	Class	No.	Driver	Co-driver	Entrant	Car	Time	Difference	Points
17	1	28	(Uruguay) Gustavo Trelles	(Argentina) Jorge Del Buono	(Uruguay) Gustavo Trelles	Mitsubishi Lancer Evo VI	4:22:51.3		10
18	2	41	(France) Jean-Marc Sanchez	(France) Jean-François Scelo	(France) Jean-Marc Sanchez	Mitsubishi Lancer Evo VI	4:23:43.4	+52.1	6
24	3	48	(Russia) Stanislav Gryazin	(Russia) Dmitriy Eremeev	(Russia) Stanislav Gryazin	Mitsubishi Lancer Evo VI	4:28:59.5	+6:08.2	4
26	4	83	(France) Eddie Mercier	(France) Jean-Michel Veret	(France) Eddie Mercier	Renault Clio RS	4:30:23.8	+7:32.5	3
30	5	82	(France) Richard Bourcier	(France) Jean-Marc Ducousso	(France) Richard Bourcier	Renault Clio RS	4:37:12.2	+14:20.9	2
31	6	47	(France) Jean-Paul Aymé	(France) Brigitte Aymé	(France) Jean-Paul Aymé	Mitsubishi Lancer Evo VI	4:39:05.0	+16:13.7	1
33	7	45	(Italy) Marta Candian	(Italy) Mara Biotti	(Italy) Marta Candian	Mitsubishi Lancer Evo VI	4:40:38.7	+17:47.4	0
34	8	88	(France) Stéphane Rovina	(France) Philippe Rovina	(France) Stéphane Rovina	Peugeot 306 Rallye	4:41:20.5	+18:29.2	0
35	9	81	(France) François Faggianelli	(France) Jean-Dominique Mattei	(France) François Faggianelli	Renault Clio RS	4:43:07.6	+20:16.3	0
36	10	87	(France) Patrick Pugliese	(France) Franck Giambi	(France) Patrick Pugliese	Peugeot 306 S16	4:46:55.6	+24:04.3	0
37	11	46	(New Zealand) Reece Jones	(New Zealand) Garry Cowan	(New Zealand) Reece Jones	Mitsubishi Lancer Evo VI	4:46:59.2	+24:07.9	0
38	12	96	(France) Thierry Chkondali	(France) Sébastien Raviot	(France) Thierry Chkondali	Honda Integra Type-R	4:47:02.3	+24:11.0	0
40	13	95	(Italy) Walter Lamonato	(Italy) Simone Scattolin	(Italy) Walter Lamonato	Opel Astra OPC	4:49:15.5	+26:24.2	0
41	14	89	(France) Yves Laurence	(France) Pascal Guinchard	(France) Yves Laurence	Peugeot 306 S16	4:49:56.2	+27:04.9	0
42	15	91	(France) Eric Filippi	(France) Guy Mizael	(France) Eric Filippi	Peugeot 306 S16	4:52:37.7	+29:46.4	0
44	16	93	(France) Antoine Paul Bastelica	(France) Antoine Felix Paolini	(France) Antoine Paul Bastelica	Renault Clio Williams	4:52:41.1	+29:49.8	0
45	17	102	(Belgium) Michel Wilders	(Belgium) Danielle Wilders-Arend	(Belgium) Michel Wilders	Honda Civic VTi	4:54:05.1	+31:13.8	0
46	18	100	(France) Thierry Dard	(France) Jean Philippe du Fayet de la Tour	(France) Thierry Dard	Honda Civic VTi	4:56:05.0	+33:13.7	0
48	19	101	(France) Jean-Marc Poisson	(France) Olivier Lesigne	(France) Jean-Marc Poisson	Honda Civic VTi	5:12:03.5	+49:12.2	0
49	20	104	(France) Hervé Tomaselli	(France) Pierre-Antoine Bonifet	(France) Hervé Tomaselli	Peugeot 106 XSI	5:20:29.8	+57:38.5	0
Retired SS16		75	(Italy) Fabrizio Mari	(Italy) Alessandro Leonardi	(Italy) Fabrizio Mari	Mitsubishi Lancer Evo VI	Mechanical		0
Retired SS14		49	(United Kingdom) Nik Elsmore	(United Kingdom) Jayson Brown	(United Kingdom) Nik Elsmore	Mitsubishi Lancer Evo VI	Accident		0
Retired SS13		103	(France) Eric Cascio	(France) Sylvia Cascio	(France) Eric Cascio	Peugeot 106 XSI	Mechanical		0
Retired SS11		43	(Italy) Giovanni Manfrinato	(Italy) Claudio Condotta	(Italy) Giovanni Manfrinato	Mitsubishi Lancer Evo VII	Accident		0
Retired SS10		92	(France) Henri-Marc Venturini	(France) Jean Vincensini	(France) Henri-Marc Venturini	Renault Clio Williams	Mechanical		0
Retired SS9		39	(France) Jean-Pierre Manzagol	(France) Sabrina De Castelli	(France) Jean-Pierre Manzagol	Mitsubishi Lancer Evo V	Mechanical		0
Retired SS6		40	(France) Jean-Marie Santoni	(France) Jean-Marc Casamatta	(France) Jean-Marie Santoni	Mitsubishi Lancer Evo VI	Accident		0
Retired SS6		44	(Belgium) Bob Colsoul	(Belgium) Tom Colsoul	(Belgium) Bob Colsoul	Mitsubishi Lancer Evo VI	Mechanical		0
Retired SS4		84	(France) Jean-Jacques Padovani	(France) Guy Voillemier	(France) Jean-Jacques Padovani	Renault Clio RS	Mechanical		0
Retired SS2		85	(France) Jean-Michel Pietri	(France) Bruno Bouvier	(France) Jean-Michel Pietri	Peugeot 306 S16	Accident		0
Retired SS2		90	(France) Jean-François Prévalet	(France) Philippe Viennet	(France) Jean-François Prévalet	Peugeot 306 S16	Mechanical		0
Retired SS1		74	(Italy) Norberto Cangani	(Italy) Eros Di Prima	(Italy) Norberto Cangani	Mitsubishi Lancer Evo VI	Mechanical		0

==== Special stages ====
Day	Stage	Stage name	Length	Winner	Car	Time	Class leaders
Leg 1 (19 Oct)	SS1	Cuttoli — Peri 1	17.40 km	(Uruguay) Gustavo Trelles	Mitsubishi Lancer Evo VI	12:40.0	(Uruguay) Gustavo Trelles
Leg 1 (19 Oct)	SS2	Ocana — Radicale 1	27.64 km	(France) Jean-Marie Santoni	Mitsubishi Lancer Evo VI	19:11.9	(France) Jean-Marie Santoni
Leg 1 (19 Oct)	SS3	Ste Marie Sicche — Petreto 1	36.73 km	(Italy) Giovanni Manfrinato	Mitsubishi Lancer Evo VII	26:05.8	(Italy) Giovanni Manfrinato
Leg 1 (19 Oct)	SS4	Cuttoli — Peri 2	17.40 km	(Uruguay) Gustavo Trelles	Mitsubishi Lancer Evo VI	12:34.9	(Italy) Giovanni Manfrinato
Leg 1 (19 Oct)	SS5	Ocana — Radicale 2	27.64 km	Stage cancelled			(Italy) Giovanni Manfrinato
Leg 2 (20 Oct)	SS6	Ste Marie Sicche — Petreto 2	36.73 km	(Italy) Giovanni Manfrinato	Mitsubishi Lancer Evo VII	25:51.6	(Italy) Giovanni Manfrinato
Leg 2 (20 Oct)	SS7	Gare de Carbuccia — Gare d'Ucciani 1	11.02 km	(Italy) Giovanni Manfrinato	Mitsubishi Lancer Evo VII	8:12.3	(Italy) Giovanni Manfrinato
Leg 2 (20 Oct)	SS8	Vero — Pont d'Azzana 2	18.28 km	(Italy) Giovanni Manfrinato	Mitsubishi Lancer Evo VII	14:11.5	(Italy) Giovanni Manfrinato
Leg 2 (20 Oct)	SS9	Lopigna — Sarrola 1	30.11 km	(Uruguay) Gustavo Trelles	Mitsubishi Lancer Evo VI	21:30.5	(Italy) Giovanni Manfrinato
Leg 2 (20 Oct)	SS10	Gare de Carbuccia — Gare d'Ucciani 2	11.02 km	(Uruguay) Gustavo Trelles	Mitsubishi Lancer Evo VI	7:58.3	(Italy) Giovanni Manfrinato
Leg 2 (20 Oct)	SS11	Vero — Pont d'Azzana 2	18.28 km	(Uruguay) Gustavo Trelles	Mitsubishi Lancer Evo VI	14:02.7	(Uruguay) Gustavo Trelles
Leg 2 (20 Oct)	SS12	Lopigna — Sarrola 2	30.11 km	(Uruguay) Gustavo Trelles	Mitsubishi Lancer Evo VI	21:29.5	(Uruguay) Gustavo Trelles
Leg 3 (21 Oct)	SS13	Penitencier Coti Chiavari — Pietra Rossa 1	24.05 km	(France) Jean-Marc Sanchez	Mitsubishi Lancer Evo VI	16:53.1	(Uruguay) Gustavo Trelles
Leg 3 (21 Oct)	SS14	Pont de Calzola — Agosta Plage 1	31.79 km	(France) Jean-Marc Sanchez	Mitsubishi Lancer Evo VI	21:25.0	(Uruguay) Gustavo Trelles
Leg 3 (21 Oct)	SS15	Penitencier Coti Chiavari — Pietra Rossa 2	24.05 km	(France) Jean-Marc Sanchez	Mitsubishi Lancer Evo VI	17:16.3	(Uruguay) Gustavo Trelles
Leg 3 (21 Oct)	SS16	Pont de Calzola — Agosta Plage 2	31.79 km	(Uruguay) Gustavo Trelles	Mitsubishi Lancer Evo VI	22:13.6	(Uruguay) Gustavo Trelles

==== Championship standings ====
- **Bold text** indicates 2001 World Champions.

Pos.	Drivers' championships		
Pos.	Move	Driver	Points
1		(Argentina) **Gabriel Pozzo**	65
2		(Uruguay) Gustavo Trelles	36
3		(Austria) Manfred Stohl	22
4		(Argentina) Marcos Ligato	22
5		(Sweden) Stig Blomqvist	14

=== FIA Cup for Super 1600 Drivers ===
==== Classification ====
Position		No.	Driver	Co-driver	Entrant	Car	Time	Difference	Points
Event	Class	No.	Driver	Co-driver	Entrant	Car	Time	Difference	Points
13	1	53	(France) Sébastien Loeb	(Monaco) Daniel Elena	(France) Citroën Sport	Citroën Saxo S1600	4:16:16.4		10
14	2	52	(Italy) Andrea Dallavilla	(Italy) Giovanni Bernacchini	(Italy) R&D Motorsport	Fiat Punto S1600	4:16:24.9	+8.5	6
15	3	56	(Italy) Giandomenico Basso	(Italy) Flavio Guglielmini	(Italy) Top Run SRL	Fiat Punto S1600	4:21:25.7	+5:09.3	4
16	4	55	(United Kingdom) Niall McShea	(United Kingdom) Michael Orr	(France) Citroën Sport	Citroën Saxo S1600	4:21:47.9	+5:31.5	3
19	5	58	(Spain) Sergio Vallejo	(Spain) Diego Vallejo	(Spain) Pronto Racing	Fiat Punto S1600	4:24:13.4	+7:57.0	2
20	6	63	(Norway) Martin Stenshorne	(United Kingdom) Clive Jenkins	(Norway) Zeta Racing	Ford Puma S1600	4:25:52.1	+9:35.7	1
21	7	69	(France) Nicolas Bernardi	(France) Delphine Bernardi	(France) Team Gamma	Peugeot 206 S1600	4:26:00.5	+9:44.1	0
22	8	50	(Austria) Manfred Stohl	(Austria) Ilka Minor	(Italy) Top Run SRL	Fiat Punto S1600	4:26:36.1	+10:19.7	0
23	9	68	(Italy) Massimo Ceccato	(Italy) Mitia Dotta	(Italy) Hawk Racing Club	Fiat Punto S1600	4:28:54.9	+12:38.5	0
25	10	65	(Paraguay) Alejandro Galanti	(Spain) Xavier Amigó	(Italy) Astra Racing	Ford Puma S1600	4:29:35.0	+13:18.6	0
27	11	54	(Belgium) Larry Cols	(Belgium) Yasmine Gerard	(Belgium) Peugeot Bastos Racing	Peugeot 206 S1600	4:32:20.3	+16:03.9	0
29	12	62	(Finland) Jussi Välimäki	(Finland) Jakke Honkanen	(Finland) ST Motors	Peugeot 206 S1600	4:34:44.1	+18:27.7	0
39	13	67	(Andorra) Albert Llovera	(Spain) Marc Corral	(Spain) Pronto Racing	Fiat Punto S1600	4:48:00.9	+31:44.5	0
Retired SS15		73	(Italy) Christian Chemin	(Italy) Matteo Alberto Bacchin	(Italy) Hawk Racing Club	Fiat Punto S1600	Mechanical		0
Retired SS14		57	(France) Cédric Robert	(France) Marie-Pierre Billoux	(France) Team Gamma	Peugeot 206 S1600	Engine		0
Retired SS14		61	(Italy) Corrado Fontana	(Italy) Renzo Casazza	(Italy) H.F. Grifone SRL	Peugeot 206 S1600	Accident		0
Retired SS14		72	(Malaysia) Saladin Mazlan	(United Kingdom) Timothy Sturla	(Malaysia) Saladin Rallying	Ford Puma S1600	Radiator		0
Retired SS11		64	(Italy) Massimo Macaluso	(Italy) Antonio Celot	(Italy) R&D Motorsport	Fiat Punto S1600	Accident		0
Retired SS4		71	(Belgium) François Duval	(Belgium) Jean-Marc Fortin	(United Kingdom) Ford Motor Co. Ltd.	Ford Puma S1600	Water pump		0
Retired SS2		59	(France) Benoît Rousselot	(France) Gilles Mondésir	(United Kingdom) Ford Motor Co. Ltd.	Ford Puma S1600	Cambelt		0

==== Special stages ====
Day	Stage	Stage name	Length	Winner	Car	Time	Class leaders
Leg 1 (19 Oct)	SS1	Cuttoli — Peri 1	17.40 km	(Belgium) François Duval	Ford Puma S1600	12:15.1	(Belgium) François Duval
Leg 1 (19 Oct)	SS2	Ocana — Radicale 1	27.64 km	(France) Sébastien Loeb	Citroën Saxo S1600	18:36.9	(France) Sébastien Loeb
Leg 1 (19 Oct)	SS3	Ste Marie Sicche — Petreto 1	36.73 km	(Italy) Andrea Dallavilla	Fiat Punto S1600	25:31.0	(Italy) Andrea Dallavilla
Leg 1 (19 Oct)	SS4	Cuttoli — Peri 2	17.40 km	(Italy) Andrea Dallavilla	Fiat Punto S1600	12:14.2	(Italy) Andrea Dallavilla
Leg 1 (19 Oct)	SS5	Ocana — Radicale 2	27.64 km	Stage cancelled			(Italy) Andrea Dallavilla
Leg 2 (20 Oct)	SS6	Ste Marie Sicche — Petreto 2	36.73 km	(France) Sébastien Loeb	Citroën Saxo S1600	25:26.7	(France) Sébastien Loeb
Leg 2 (20 Oct)	SS7	Gare de Carbuccia — Gare d'Ucciani 1	11.02 km	(Italy) Andrea Dallavilla	Fiat Punto S1600	8:17.0	(France) Sébastien Loeb
Leg 2 (20 Oct)	SS8	Vero — Pont d'Azzana 2	18.28 km	(Italy) Andrea Dallavilla	Fiat Punto S1600	14:07.0	(France) Sébastien Loeb
Leg 2 (20 Oct)	SS9	Lopigna — Sarrola 1	30.11 km	(Italy) Andrea Dallavilla	Fiat Punto S1600	21:01.4	(France) Sébastien Loeb
Leg 2 (20 Oct)	SS10	Gare de Carbuccia — Gare d'Ucciani 2	11.02 km	(Italy) Andrea Dallavilla	Fiat Punto S1600	7:45.0	(France) Sébastien Loeb
Leg 2 (20 Oct)	SS11	Vero — Pont d'Azzana 2	18.28 km	(Italy) Andrea Dallavilla	Fiat Punto S1600	13:42.8	(France) Sébastien Loeb
Leg 2 (20 Oct)	SS12	Lopigna — Sarrola 2	30.11 km	(France) Sébastien Loeb	Citroën Saxo S1600	20:44.4	(France) Sébastien Loeb
Leg 3 (21 Oct)	SS13	Penitencier Coti Chiavari — Pietra Rossa 1	24.05 km	(Italy) Andrea Dallavilla	Fiat Punto S1600	16:19.2	(France) Sébastien Loeb
Leg 3 (21 Oct)	SS14	Pont de Calzola — Agosta Plage 1	31.79 km	(Italy) Andrea Dallavilla	Fiat Punto S1600	20:37.8	(France) Sébastien Loeb
Leg 3 (21 Oct)	SS15	Penitencier Coti Chiavari — Pietra Rossa 2	24.05 km	(Italy) Andrea Dallavilla	Fiat Punto S1600	17:13.9	(France) Sébastien Loeb
Leg 3 (21 Oct)	SS16	Pont de Calzola — Agosta Plage 2	31.79 km	(France) Sébastien Loeb	Citroën Saxo S1600	21:33.0	(France) Sébastien Loeb

==== Championship standings ====
- **Bold text** indicates 2001 World Champions.

Pos.	Drivers' championships		
Pos.	Move	Driver	Points
1		(France) **Sébastien Loeb**	40
2		(Italy) Andrea Dallavilla	30
3	2	(Italy) Giandomenico Basso	10
4	1	(Norway) Martin Stenshorne	8
5	1	(Belgium) Larry Cols	7
