= Marc Martí =

Spanish rally co-driver (born 1966)

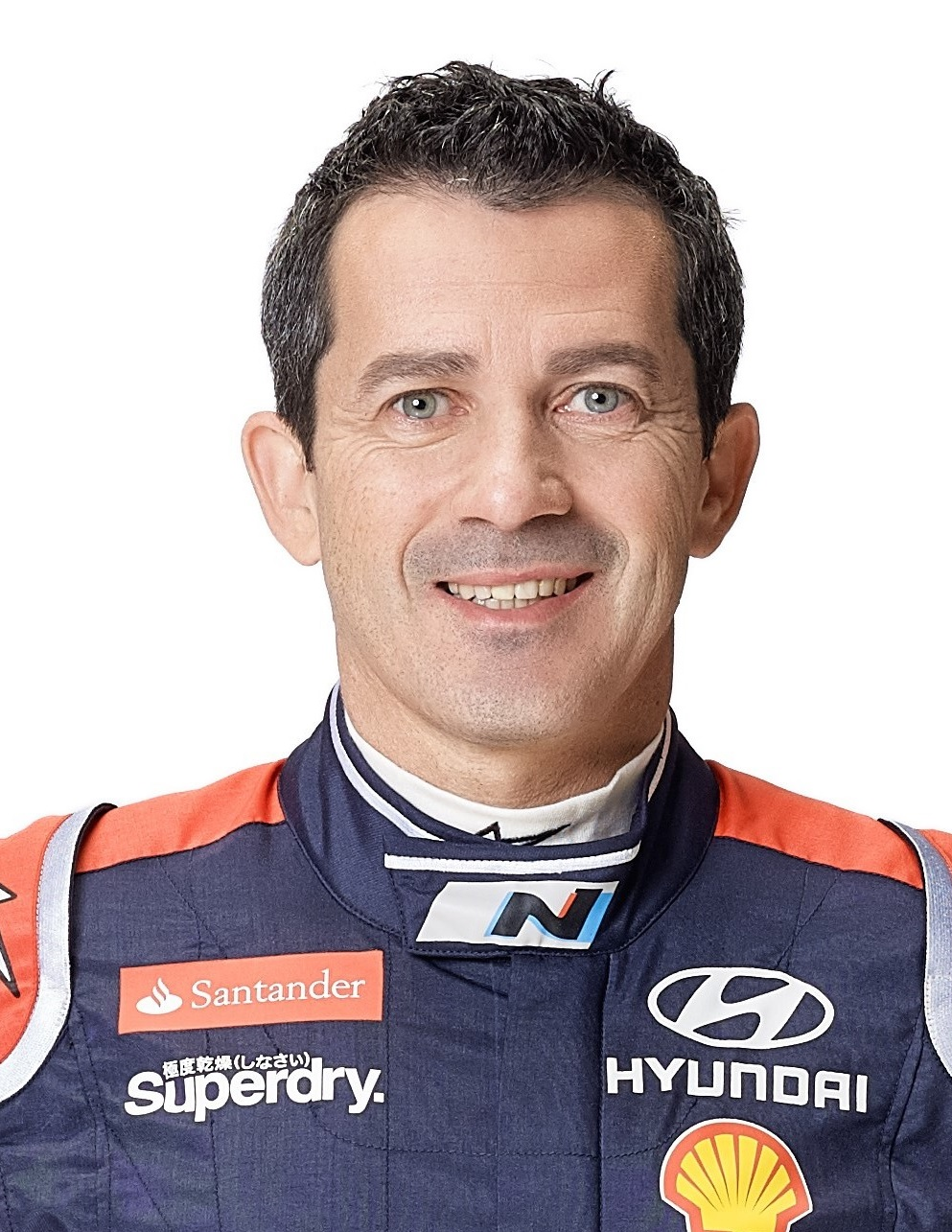

Personal information
- Nationality: (Spain) Spanish
- Born: 1 October 1966 (age 60); Molins de Rei, Spain

World Rally Championship record
- Years active: 1991–1993, 1995–2010, 2012, 2014–present
- Driver: (Spain) Oriol Gómez (Spain) Jesús Puras (Spain) Carlos Sainz (Spain) Dani Sordo (Andorra) Albert Lloverá (Chile) Eliseo Salazar (Mexico) Ricardo Triviño (Spain) Nil Solans (Chile) Pedro Heller (Chile) Alberto Heller (Bolivia) Bruno Bulacia (Mexico) Miguel Granados
- Teams: Seat, Citroën, Hyundai
- Rallies: 219
- Championships: 0
- Rally wins: 3
- Podiums: 48
- Stage wins: 175
- First rally: 1991 Rally de Catalunya
- First win: 2001 Tour de Corse
- Last win: 2004 Rally Argentina
- Last rally: 2025 Rally Saudi Arabia

Marc Martí Moreno (born 1 October 1966) is a Spanish rally co-driver, who has partnered with Jesús Puras, Carlos Sainz Sr. and Dani Sordo for the Citroën and Hyundai factory teams at the World Rally Championship. He has claimed three WRC wins and 48 podiums, plus five wins in the European Rally Championship, as well as the 2013 Monza Rally Show.

== Biography ==
Martí debuted in the World Rally Championship (WRC) as a co-driver to Oriol Gómez in 1992. In the 1999 season, he began his partnership with Jesús Puras and the Citroën factory team. The pair took a surprise second place at the 1999 Tour de Corse, behind another Citroën Xsara Kit Car piloted by Philippe Bugalski. Puras and Martí went on to take their first win at the same event two years later. This was also the first of 32 world rally victories for the Citroën Xsara WRC.

For the 2003 season, Martí replaced Luís Moya as the co-driver to double world champion Carlos Sainz. The pair won the 2003 Rally of Turkey and the 2004 Rally Argentina, and helped Citroën to two manufacturers' world titles. After Sainz's retirement from the WRC, Martí began co-driving to Sainz's young protégé Dani Sordo. They won the Junior World Rally Championship in 2005 and made a successful transition to WRC level the following year, recording four podium finishes. After the 2010 Rally Finland, Sordo announced that he would have a new co-driver, Diego Vallejo, in the next rally. Martí stated that he had planned to retire after the 2010 season, but now the retirement happened a bit earlier. In December 2013, it was announced he would join Hyundai Motorsport and return to co-drive for Dani Sordo for the 2014 WRC campaign. Marti currently co-drives the 2017 WRC-3 champion – Nil Solans.

=== WRC victories ===
#	Event	Season	Driver	Car
1	45ème Tour de Corse – Rallye de France	2001	(Spain) Jesús Puras	Citroën Xsara WRC
2	4th Rally of Turkey	2003	(Spain) Carlos Sainz	Citroën Xsara WRC
3	24º Rally Argentina	2004	(Spain) Carlos Sainz	Citroën Xsara WRC
