= Citroën Racing =

Motorsport division of Citroën

(France) Citroën Racing
- Founded: 1960
- Team principal(s): Beth Paretta
- Current series: Formula E
- Former series: World Rally Championship
- Current drivers: (New Zealand) Nick Cassidy (France) Jean-Éric Vergne
- Races: 17
- Wins: 1
- Podiums: 6
- Poles: 1
- Points: 182
- Teams' Championships: 0
- First entry: 2025 São Paulo ePrix
- Last entry: 2026 London ePrix
- First win: 2026 Mexico City ePrix
- Last win: 2026 Mexico City ePrix
- Website: https://www.citroen-racing.com

Citroën Racing is a motorsport brand and department of the French automobile manufacturer, Automobiles Citroën (Note: Automobiles Citroën is a 100% owned subsidiary of Stellantis NV) that currently competes in the ABB FIA Formula E World Championship with its drivers Nick Cassidy and Jean-Éric Vergne. It is most notable for entering the Citroën World Rally Team into the World Rally Championship until 2019, thus helping to propel Sébastien Loeb and Daniel Elena to become the most successful crew in the history of the series.

As of January 2023, the department's primary function is manufacturing the C3 Rally2 along with distribution of parts, including for its catalogue of out-of-production cars. It no longer contests motorsport directly itself although Citroën provide support through the brand to privateer entries of the C3. Retail sales of official Citroën Racing branded merchandise is handled by Peugeot Citroën Racing Shop.

Citroën Racing is a constituent of Stellantis Motorsport along with other motorsport and performance brands, subsidiaries and departments within the portfolio of Citroën's parent company, Stellantis.

== History ==
Citroën Racing has also previously been known as Citroën Compétitions and Citroën Sport.

=== Citroën Compétitions ===
Although Citroën vehicles had been used by privateers for many years previously, the department originates from 1960 when René Cotton, the winning team manager of the 1959 Monte Carlo Rally, was asked by Citroën to increase participation in rallying with their support. When Citroën began entering motorsport competitions itself in 1965, it effectively formed the Citroën racing department. After Cotton's death in 1971, his wife Marlène succeeded him and was highly qualified having spent twelve years in his employment and inheriting all his personal notes, plans and documents for business and sport activities. Due to their financial troubles and the decade's energy crises, Citroën reduced motorsport participation during the 1970s.

Logo used from 1985 to 1989

In 1980, former executive secretary of the FFSA, Guy Verrier, was tasked by Citroën to build a World Rally Championship car and team. Verrier, who had driven for Citroën under the leadership of both Cottons, was responsible for the delivery of the Group B Visas and BX 4TC. Citroën withdrew from the championship early in 1986 to further develop the car, but the car's class was banned by FISA president Jean-Marie Ballestre after 1986 which ended the campaign. Coincidentally, Verrier had challenged Ballestre for the FFSA Presidency in 1984, but lost.

=== Citroën Sport ===
Logo used from 1989 to 2006

The Citroën Sport department was officially established in 1989 with former rally co-driver Guy Fréquelin as its head. His, and the department's initial responsibility was to enter Rally-Raid with a Citroën ZX, which delivered four wins of the Paris-Dakar Rally amongst other successes. Ari Vatanen and Jacky Ickx were amongst the enlisted drivers.

Later in the 1990s, the focus returned to the World Rally Championship with the two-wheel-drive Xsara Kit Car competing in the 2-Litre World Rally Cup for Manufacturers. Although championship success would elude the team, the crew of Philippe Bugalski and Jean-Paul Chiaroni won both the 1999 Rally Catalunya and Tour de Corse outright, out-pacing the more powerful and four-wheel-drive World Rally Cars. These wins are credited as helping the FIA to decide on abandoning the class and cup at the end of the year, to replace them with less powerful Super 1600 cars from 2001. The Saxo VTS was one such car, which Citroën Sport entered into the Super 1600 Championship for Drivers with Sébastien Loeb at the wheel. Loeb won the championship.

The Xsara meanwhile was converted into the Xsara World Rally Car, and with it Citroën Sport entered select rounds of the World Rally Championship in 2001. Jesús Puras and Marc Martí won one, the 2001 Tour de Corse. Parent company PSA were initially reluctant however to allow Citroën to enter the World Rally Championship for Manufacturers, directly facing their other brand, Peugeot. However, in 2003 they relented and both brands were represented, with the new Citroën Total World Rally Team winning the championship ahead of Peugeot as runners up and four other manufacturers. Citroën repeated the success in 2004 and 2005, after which Peugeot left the championship for good.

The Citroën World Rally Team semi-withdrew in 2006, nominating a Kronos Racing entry to compete as a manufacturer in their name whilst they developed a new C4 World Rally Car. They returned fully with the C4 in the following year and began to dominate from 2008, winning the championship every year until 2012.

Director Fréquelin retired at the end of 2007 and was replaced by Olivier Quesnel.

In 2009, the Citroën Junior Team was established as a second team, giving drives to youngsters and customers including Sébastien Ogier, Conrad Rautenbach and Kimi Räikkönen.

=== Citroën Racing ===
Citroën Sport was renamed in 2009 as part of an overhaul of the company's branding. At the same time, the DS marque was revived as a sub-brand and these models began to be used as the basis for the rally cars.

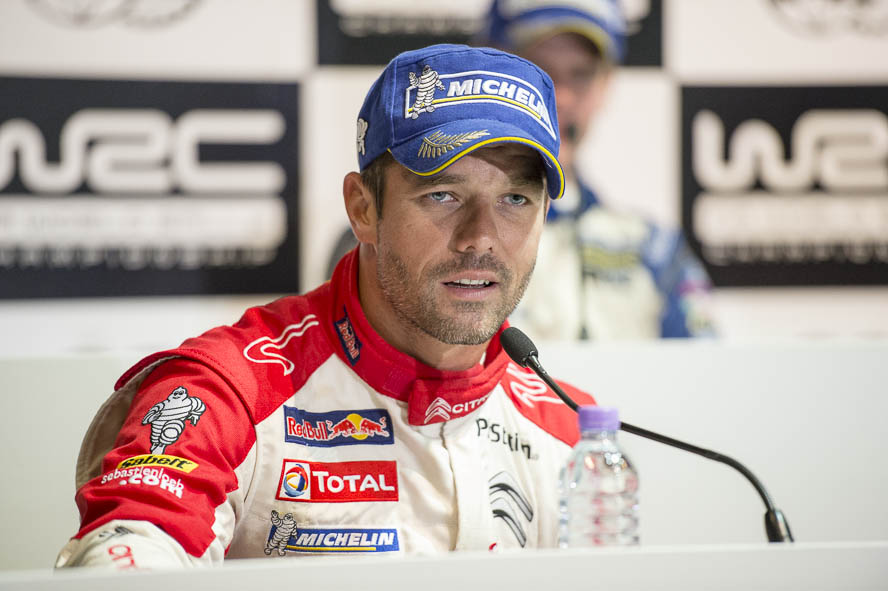
Sébastien Loeb won 9 WRC driver's championships with Citroën

The C4 WRC was replaced by the Citroën DS3 WRC from 2011, which helped to win two more WRC manufacturer championships in 2011 and 2012. After the 2011 season, Quesnel was succeeded by Yves Matton as Team Principal and Director.

By 2013, Citroën had WRC, RRC, R5, R3T, R2 and R1 variants of rally cars available to customers. Former Formula 1 driver Robert Kubica won 5 rallies in class of the then new WRC2 Championship, enough for him to take the title driving a Citroën DS3 Regional Rally Car, essentially a detuned DS3 WRC, prepared and entered by PH Sport. Meanwhile, Sébastien Chardonnet won WRC3 driving a DS3 R3T.

In 2014, Citroën won the tender from the FIA to operate Junior WRC for three years. Championship entrants drove DS3 R3T cars which were provided and serviced by Citroën Racing on each rally. This replaced the Citroën Top Driver series, a non-FIA cup that ran on WRC rallies in 2013.

Also in 2014, the Citroën World Touring Car Team began a three-season entry in the FIA World Touring Car Championship, winning the manufacturer's title and the driver's title through José María López every year. Loeb was employed as lead driver as he reduced his world rally participation in 2013, and reigning WTCC champion Yvan Muller joined as teammate. The programme was cancelled after 2016 in order to focus efforts on WRC again from 2017.

The World Rally Team meanwhile took another sabbatical from the WRC in 2016 to focus on development of the C3 WRC for 2017. However, the team's operations continued on most rounds, appearing as Abu Dhabi Total WRT, albeit not in the manufacturer's championship.

Matton became FIA Rally Director ahead of the 2018 season and was replaced by Pierre Budar.

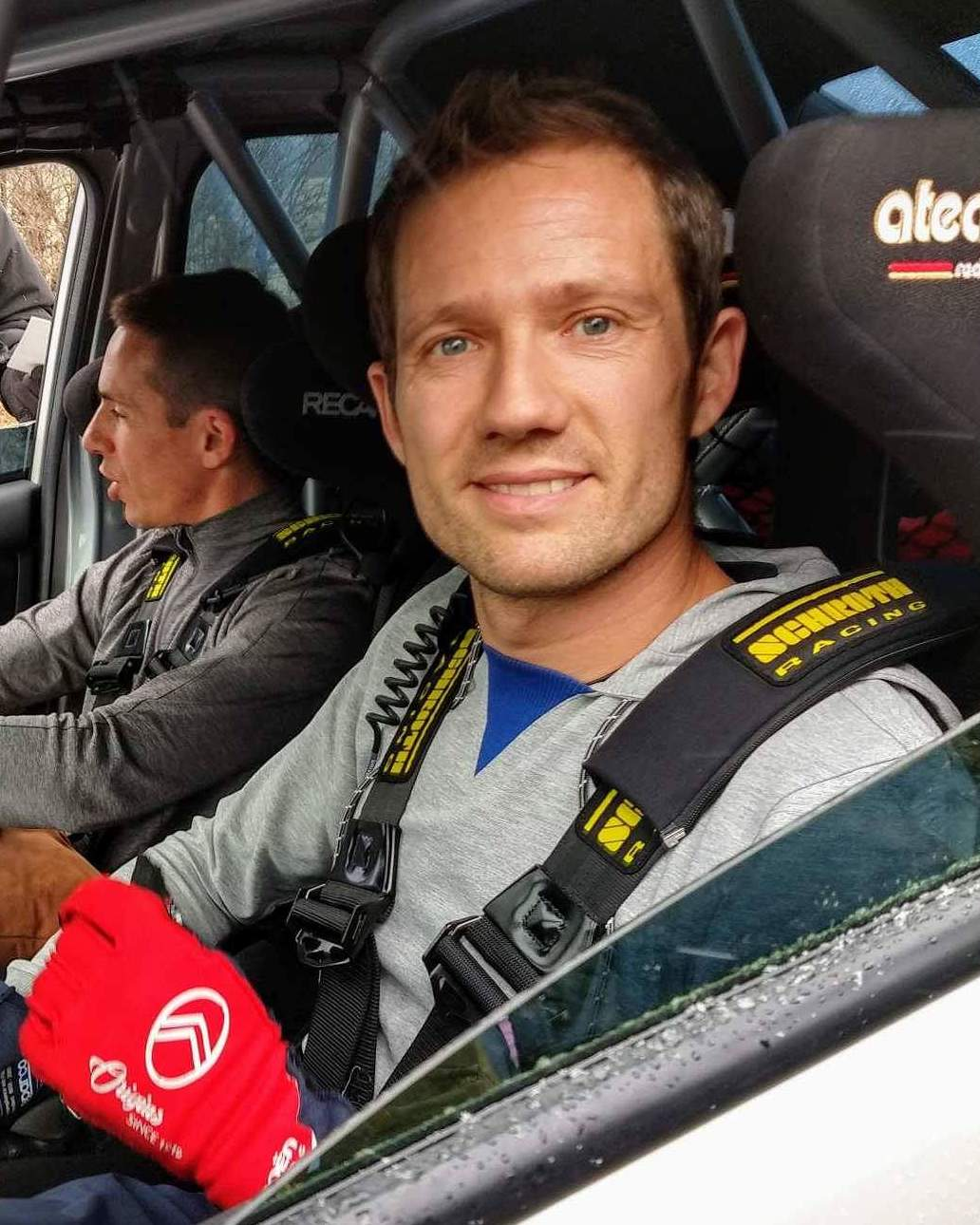
Sébastien Ogier during the 2019 Monte-Carlo Rally

The C3 was not successful in the new era of World Rally Car from 2017, and the marque finished fourth of four in the championship two years running. The team dropped Kris Meeke midway through 2018 after a series of crashes raised safety and risk concerns. They improved one place to finish third in 2019 thanks to the signing of former Junior driver and six-time world champion Sébastien Ogier. However, Ogier walked away from his two-year contract after only one year thanks to a performance clause, following a series of mechanical failures that cost him vital wins and championship points. After Ogier experienced hydraulic issues at Rally de Catalunya which handed the championship title to rival Ott Tänak, his wife, Andrea Kaiser, publicly humiliated the company and created a media stir by tweeting her opinion, calling shame on the company and by using the hashtag "#Shitroen". Citroën Racing withdrew from the championship "due to the absence of a first-class driver available for the 2020 season". By this point they had already announced they would be withdrawing before the hybrid Rally1, which they had campaigned in favour of, would become the regulation from 2022.

Also in 2019, Citroën entered the WRC2 Pro Championship, albeit with only one driver, Mads Østberg, instead of two like the other entries. The team, run by nominated Belgian company DG Sport, finished the championship in third of three manufacturers.

Since 2020, Citroën have not entered any international motorsport series, although have supported drivers such as Østberg, Yohan Rossel, Stéphane Lefebvre and Alejandro Cachón in WRC2 and WRC3 through rally companies such as Saintéloc Racing, PH Sport, DG Sport and Sports & You.

== Rally Raid ==
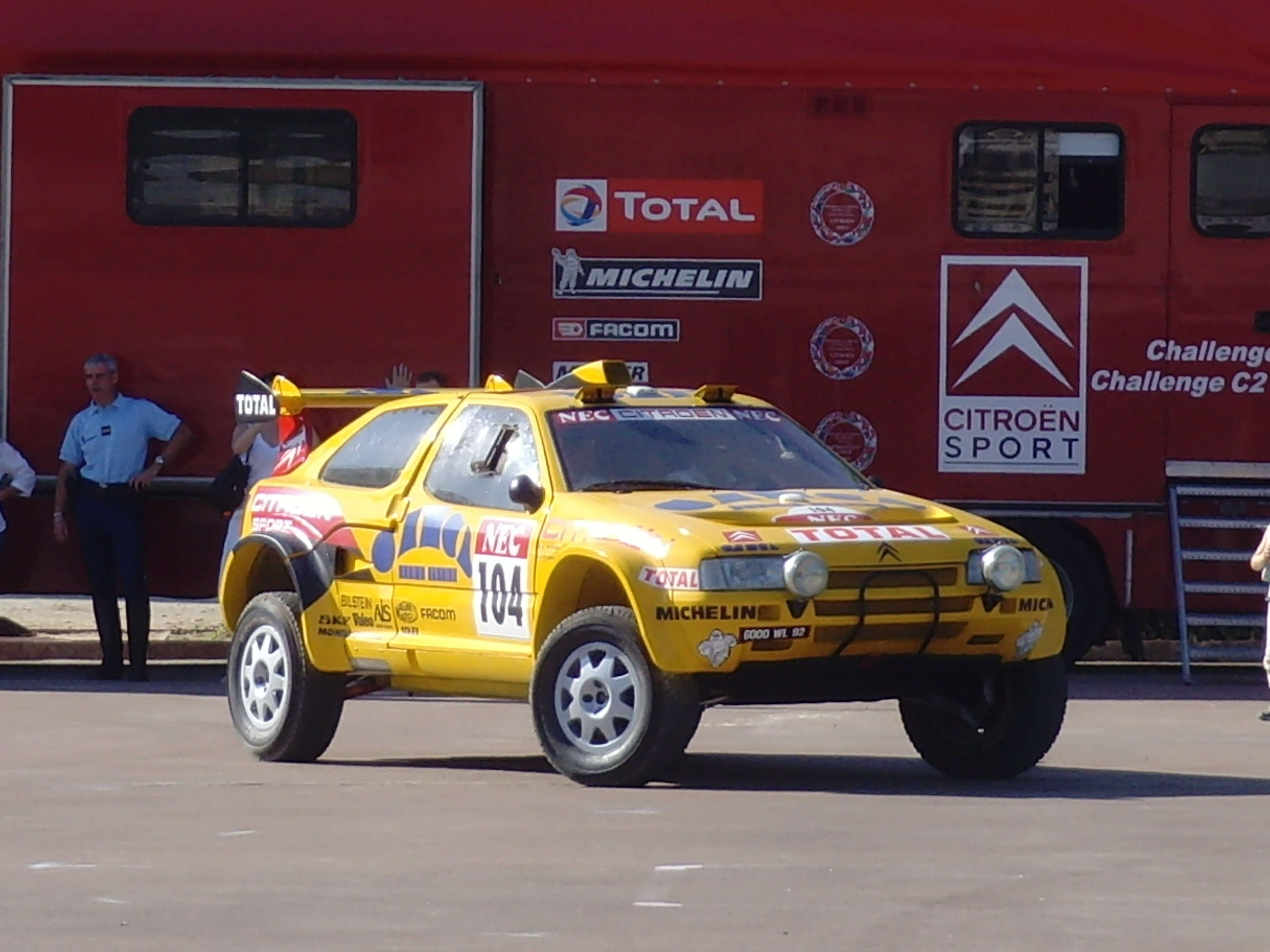
1991 Paris–Dakar winning Citroën ZX Rallye Raid, photographed in 2007

In Rally raid, the ZX Rallye Raid won the Constructor's title for Citroën Sport in the FIA World Cup for Cross-Country Rallies for 5 years from 1993 to 1997. It also took drivers Pierre Lartigue and Ari Vatanen to title glory in those years. However, in 1997, Citroën Sport announced withdrawal from the rally raid discipline to focus on the Saxo and Xsara rally and racing cars.

The ZX Rallye Raid also saw success in the Paris–Dakar Rally, winning four times; and twice in the Paris–Moscow–Beijing Rally. In addition, Citroën won the Pharaons Rally in 1991 and the Tunisia rally in 1992.

== Formula E ==
In September 2025, electric open-wheel single-seater championship FIA Formula E World Championship announced that Citroën will enter the series in the 2025–26 season as Citroën Racing Formula E Team. This will be the marque's open-wheel and electric racing debut. Citroën will reportedly replace Stellantis sister brand Maserati in the championship. The team signed Nick Cassidy and double champion Jean-Éric Vergne as its driver pair.

At the 2025 São Paulo ePrix, Nick Cassidy scored a podium on debut for the team, finishing P3 in the standings for that race.

At the 2026 Mexico City ePrix, Cassidy took victory to take the team’s first win in Formula E, after starting from 13th.

In July 2026, right before the 2026 Tokyo ePrix double header event, Citroën Racing's team principal Cyril Blais unexpectedly passed away at the age of 43. For the upcoming season, Citroën has appointed Beth Paretta as Blais' successor. She will be supported by Frederic Espinos as deputy team principal, who previously held the same position at the Lola Yamaha ABT team.

== Cars ==
=== Rally Cars ===
==== Group 5 ====
- Citroën SM

==== Group B ====
- Visa Trophée
- Visa Chrono II
- Visa 1000 Pistes
- BX 4TC

==== Group A ====
- Saxo Kit Car
- Xsara Kit Car

==== World Rally Car ====
- Xsara WRC
- C4 WRC
- DS3 WRC (and RRC)
- C3 WRC

==== Group R ====
- C3 R5/Rally2
- DS3 R5
- C3 Rally2 Kit (kit only)
- DS3 R3T
- C2 R2
- DS3 R1

==== Super 1600 ====
- C2
- Saxo VTS

=== Rally-Raid ===
- ZX Rallye Raid

=== Touring Cars ===
- Citroën C-Elysée WTCC
