= Citroën World Rally Team =

World Rally Championship manufacturer team

Citroën WRT
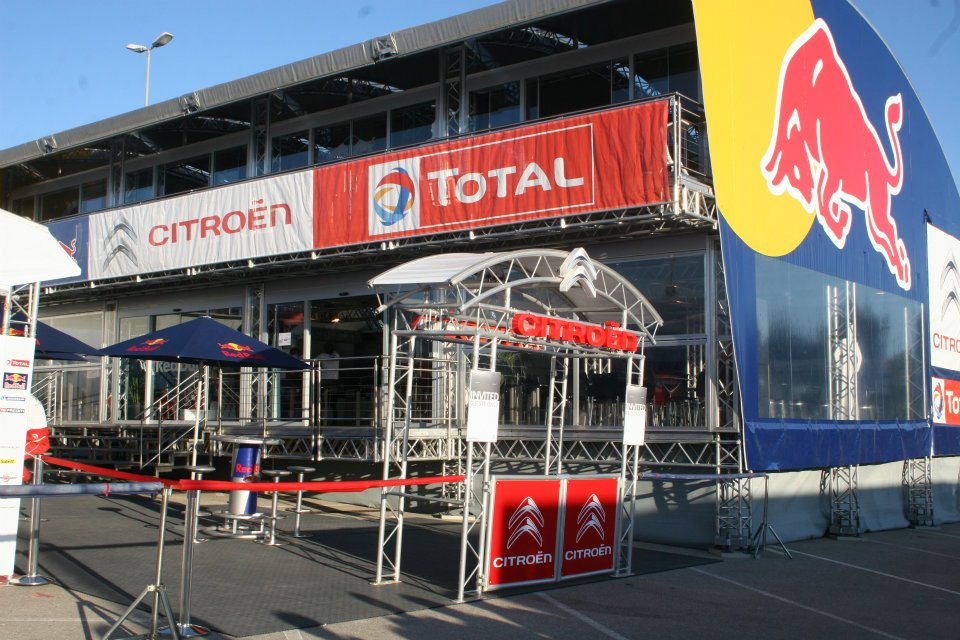
- Full name: Citroën Total World Rally Team
- Base: Versailles, France
- Team principal(s): Guy Fréquelin (2003–2007); Olivier Quesnel (2008–2011); Yves Matton (2012–2017); Pierre Budar (2018–2019)
- Chassis: Citroën Xsara WRC; Citroën C4 WRC; Citroën DS3 WRC; Citroën C3 WRC
- Tyres: Michelin

World Rally Championship history
- Debut: 2003 Monte Carlo Rally
- Last event: 2019 Rally Catalunya
- Manufacturers' Championships: 8 (2003–2005, 2008–2012)
- Drivers' Championships: 9 (2004–2012)
- Rally wins: 102

The Citroën Total World Rally Team was the Citroën factory backed entry into the World Rally Championship (WRC), run by Citroën Racing.

== History ==
=== Background ===
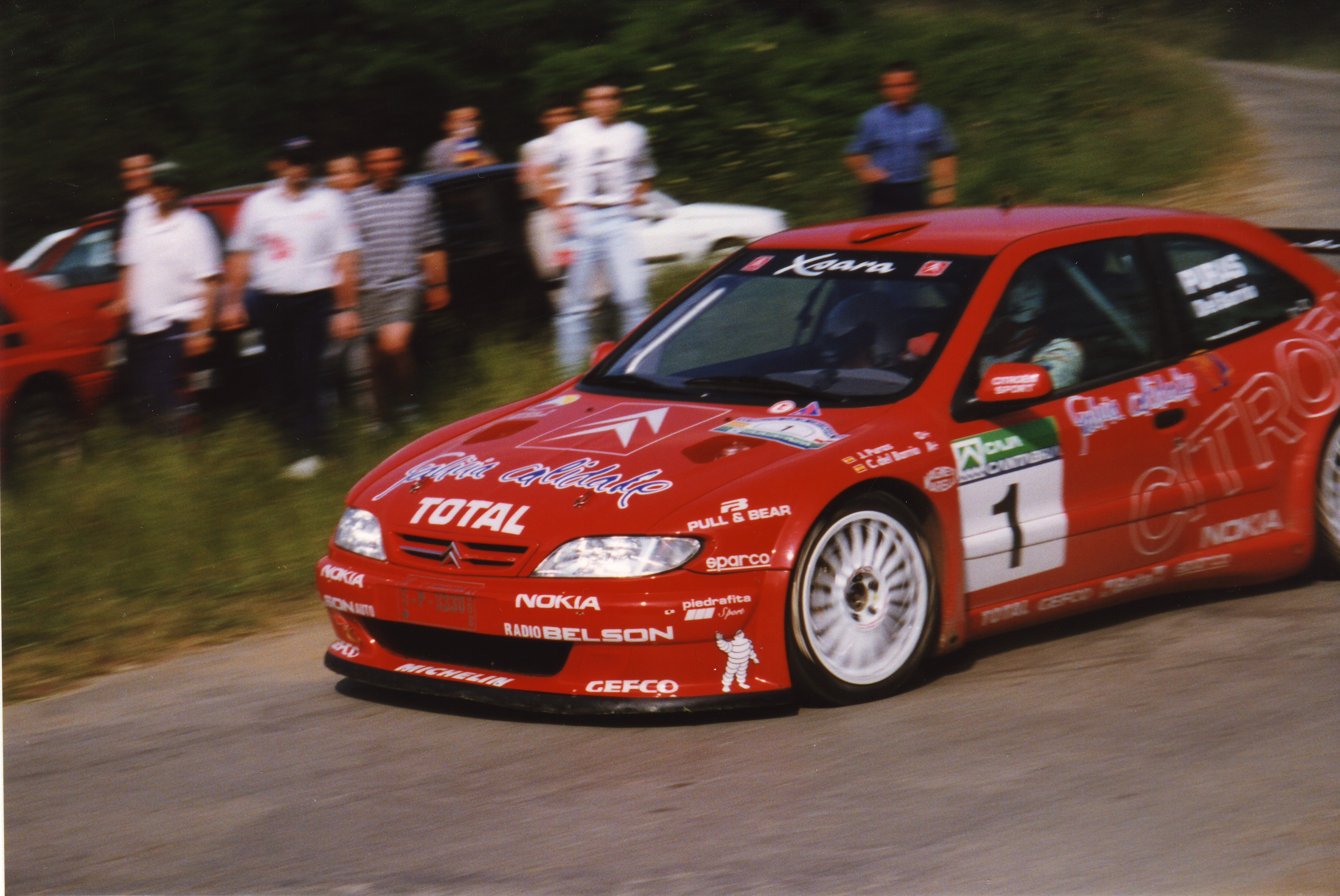
Citroën Xsara Kit Car at the 1998 Rallye Cantabria

In 1998, following its withdrawal from Rally raid competition, Citroën Sport began developing the Xsara Kit Car. Citroën entered the French Rally Championship in 1998 with Philippe Bugalski, who won driver's titles in both 1998 and 1999; and Sébastien Loeb who won the driver's title in 2001. In addition, Citroën also entered the car on asphalt rounds of the World Rally Championship. Bugalski finished fifth on the car's WRC debut on Rally Catalunya in April 1998, while Jesús Puras retired with engine problems. On Tour de Corse, Fabien Doenlen finished seventh and Patrick Magaud finished tenth whilst Bugalski retired with broken suspension. On Rallye Sanremo, Magaud finished 11th, Puras retired with engine problems and Bugalski crashed out.

In 1999, Bugalski and Puras were entered to the three asphalt rallies again, with Citroën also entering the 2-litre World Cup for Manufacturers. Bugalski won not only his class, but also the overall rallies of Catalunya and Corsica, beating the more powerful and four-wheel-drive World Rally Cars. Puras finished runner-up in Corsica. These results are credited with influencing the FIA's decision to ban the class and cup from the WRC at the end of that season.

Citroën Sport converted the Xsara Kit Cars into four-wheel drive World Rally Cars, intending to contest the 2001 World Rally Championship for Manufacturers, however the owners of the company, PSA Group, forbid the application. The Citroën Xsara T4 WRC was entered into selected rounds of the WRC, debuting at Rally Catalunya. Bugalski would have won but for a time penalty applied in dubious circumstances. Jesús Puras won in Corsica, while at San Remo Sébastien Loeb finished second on his first rally in a WRC car.

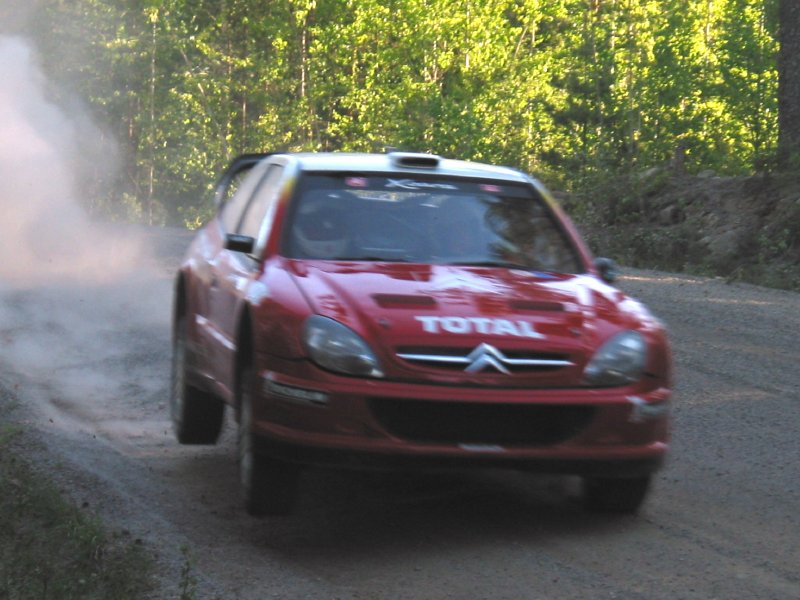
Citroën Xsara WRC at the Finland in 2002

For the 2002 season, Citroën contested 8 of the 14 WRC rounds. However, owner PSA still refused to allow them to enter the manufacturer's championship facing their other marque Peugeot.. Sébastien Loeb and co-driver Daniel Elena provisionally won the season-opening Monte Carlo Rally but due to an illegal tyre change, received a time penalty demoting him to second. He later won his first rally driving the Xsara at Rallye Deutschland. The team also got a third-place finish on the Safari Rally with Thomas Radstrom.

=== 2003 season ===
Citroën Total World Rally Team contested their first full year in the World Rally Championship for Manufacturers in 2003, having previously competed occasionally as Automobiles Citroën. They signed former World Champion drivers Colin McRae and Carlos Sainz from Ford to join Loeb. Bugalski was also entered in a fourth car on asphalt rallies. The team won the first event of the season, Rallye Monte Carlo, with a 1–2–3 finish with Loeb winning ahead of McRae and Sainz. Loeb also won Rallye Deutschland and Rallye Sanremo. Sainz won the Rally of Turkey. In their first full year, the team took the Manufacturers' championship, while Loeb finished second to Petter Solberg in the Drivers' championship. Sainz finished third and McRae was seventh.

=== 2004 season ===
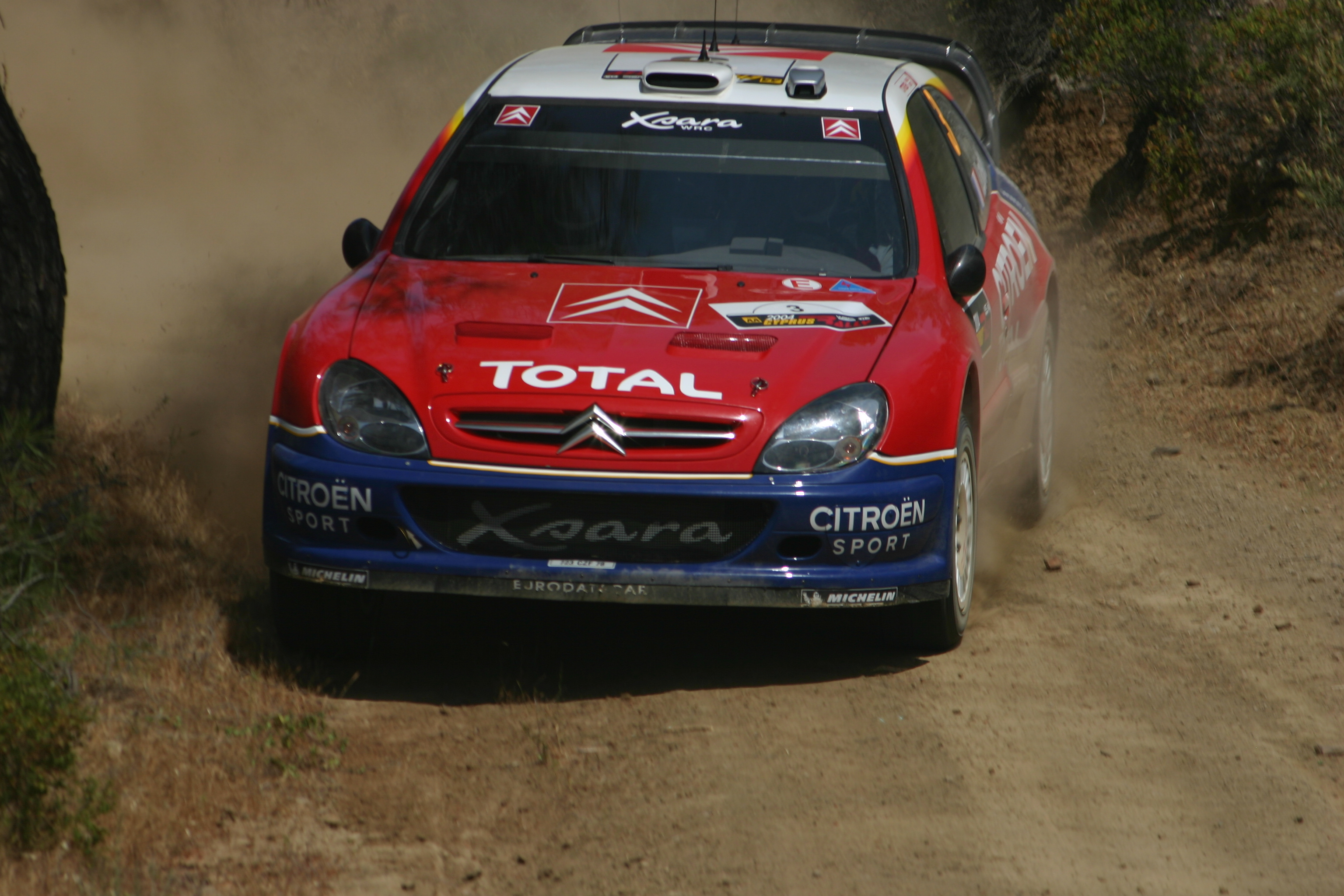
Citroën Xsara WRC at the 2004 Cyprus Rally

Citroën reduced their team for 2004, due to new WRC rules that manufacturer teams could only enter two drivers at each rally. Loeb and Sainz were the two drivers retained, and McRae was dropped. Loeb won the Monte Carlo Rally, the Swedish Rally, the Cyprus Rally, the Rally of Turkey, Rallye Deutschland and Rally Australia. Sainz won at Rally Argentina. Loeb won his first Drivers' championship. The team took the Manufacturers' championship. Sainz won on Rally Argentina and finished fourth in the standings.

=== 2005 season ===
For the 2005 season, the primary drivers were Loeb and François Duval. Due to a string of poor performances, Duval was replaced by Sainz for Turkey and Greece. Loeb won the rallies of Monte Carlo, New Zealand, Italia Sardinia, Cyprus, Turkey, Acropolis, Argentina, Deutschland, France and Catalunya on his way to winning the Drivers' Championship. Duval took his debut win at the Rally Australia. Citroën took the Manufacturers' championship.

=== 2006 season ===
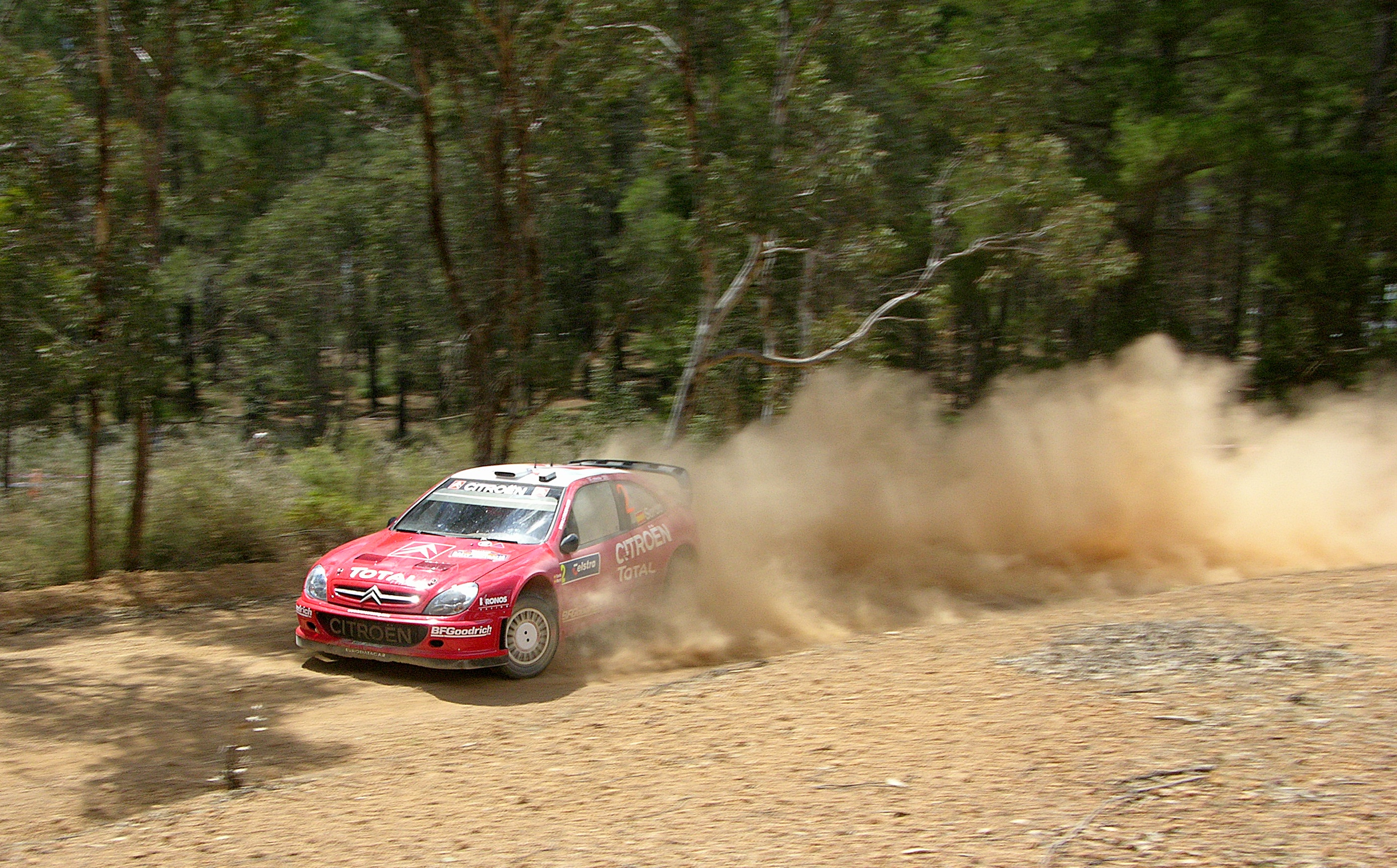
Citroën Xsara WRC at the 2006 Rally Australia

For 2006, Citroën WRT took a one-year sabbatical, while developing a new car for 2007. Loeb was joined by Xavier Pons and third-driver Dani Sordo at the semi-privateer team Kronos Citroën, which received significant funding from Citroën Sport running their Xsara WRC cars. Sordo was soon promoted to second driver over Pons. Meanwhile, Loeb again won the Drivers' title, despite missing events in Turkey, Australia, New Zealand and Great Britain after breaking his arm in a mountain biking accident. He was replaced by former world champion Colin McRae for Turkey, who was then replaced by Pons for Australia, New Zealand and Great Britain.

=== 2007 season ===
For the 2007 season, Citroën officially re-entered the World Rally Championship with the all new C4 WRC, driven by Loeb and Sordo. Loeb diced with Ford's Marcus Grönholm throughout the year, only securing his record-equaling fourth straight Drivers' title at the final event, the Rally GB. Loeb won in Monte Carlo, Mexico, Portugal, Argentina, Germany, Spain, France and Ireland. Sordo ended the season in 4th place. At the end of the season, Guy Fréquelin resigned as team principal, and was replaced by Olivier Quesnel.

=== 2008 season ===
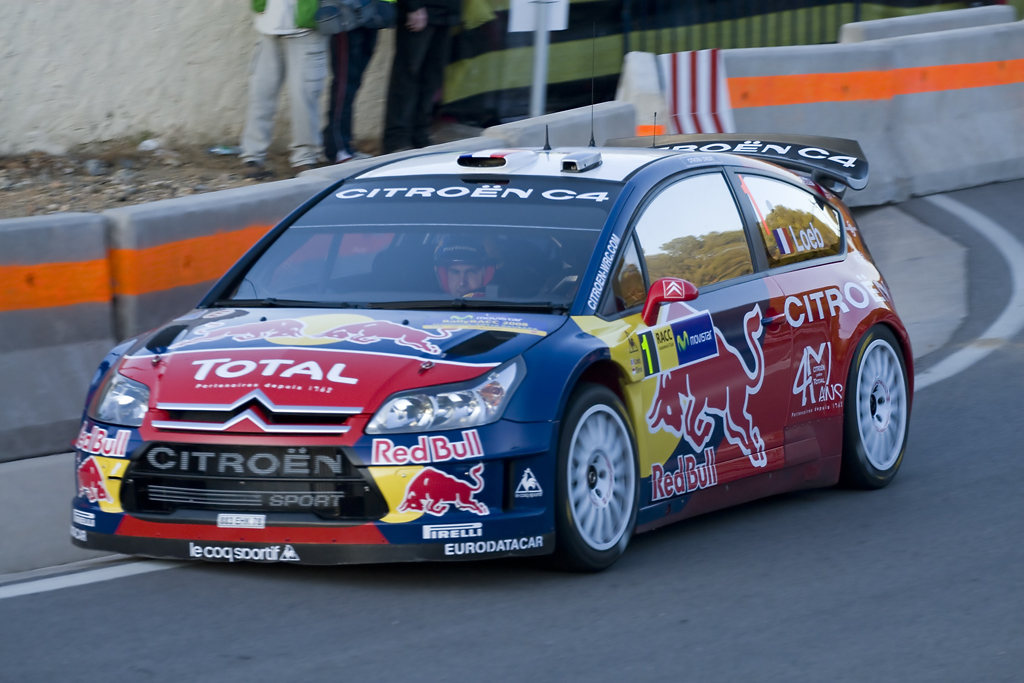
Citroën C4 WRC at the 2008 Rally Catalunya

Loeb and Sordo continued as the team's drivers, whereas drinks company Red Bull joined the team as main sponsor. At the 2008 Monte Carlo Rally, Loeb won, while Sordo suffered engine trouble, and was forced to retire, rejoining under the Superally rules.

The season culminated in the team winning both the drivers' (Loeb) and manufacturers' titles ahead of Mikko Hirvonen and Ford respectively. In a typically dominant year after the retirement of Grönholm, Loeb's eleven wins for the season broke his existing 2005 record (10) for the greatest number of wins for one driver in an individual season, as well as bringing his own career total of WRC rally victories to 47. A still winless Sordo, with 65 points, nevertheless accomplished third in the drivers' standings.

=== 2009 season ===
Loeb and Sordo were retained for the 2009 season. Loeb won the opening five events of the season, but suffered a mid-season drop in form and fell behind Mikko Hirvonen in the standings. However, he won the title by one point after winning the final two rounds of the season. Sordo finished third in the standings, scoring seven podium finishes, but still no wins.

=== 2010 season ===
Loeb and Sordo were retained again for the 2010 season. Loeb won in Mexico, Jordan, Turkey and Bulgaria. Citroën Junior Team driver and Citroën protégé Sébastien Ogier won in Portugal, increasing the pressure on the still-winless Dani Sordo. Loeb took the driver's crown for the 7th time in a row, while Sordo managed 5th. Alongside Loeb, Sordo and Ogier's individual performances, Citroën took yet another manufacturer title.

=== 2011 season ===
Loeb was joined by Ogier permanently for 2011, as he replaced Sordo. Ogier and Loeb took 5 wins each with the brand new Citroën DS3 WRC. Loeb finished again on top spot retaining his title for his 8th consecutive time while Ogier finished 3rd in the standings, Citroën also took the manufacturer crown.

=== 2012 season ===
After Sébastien Ogier's departure to Volkswagen Motorsport, Mikko Hirvonen, released by the departure of Ford Motor Company, was signed by Citroën for 2012, driving the second Citroën DS3 WRC alongside Sébastien Loeb. Loeb took his first victory of the season on the 80th Monte Carlo Rally, and also secured wins in Mexico, Argentina and Greece. Hirvonen also won the Rally de Portugal but he was disqualified due to his clutch and turbo being deemed illegal.

=== 2013 season ===
Red Bull's sponsorship moved to Volkswagen Motorsport as the Citroën team began a new long term partnership with Abu Dhabi Racing. The season started off with a win at the Monte Carlo Rally for Sébastien Loeb, who was only competing in 4 rallies in what was due to be his final WRC season, whilst teammates Hirvonen and Sordo placed 5th and 3rd. In Sweden, Hirvonen and Sordo both crashed out, and Loeb narrowly missed out on another win as he was denied by fellow Frenchman Ogier in the Volkswagen Polo R WRC. Loeb was absent at Rally Guanajuato México, meanwhile Hirvonen finished second with Sordo in fourth.

During the next rally in Portugal, Sordo clipped a tree that ended his challenge whilst battling with Ogier. Hirvonen inherited a successive 2nd-place finish. The 33rd Rally Argentina would see the return of Loeb, who took a commanding final victory. During the first stage of the Acropolis rally, Hirvonen's steering rack failed and came loose resulting in Sordo leading a lone challenge for Citroën, eventually finishing second.

In Sardinia, the team struggled to take the challenge to Volkswagen, Hirvonen's DNF and Sordo's 4th place was a disappointing result. Because of a disappointing first half to the season, the team decided to give Ulsterman Kris Meeke a chance with the third Citroën DS3 WRC in Finland. Sordo finished 5th, and Hirvonen 3rd despite a high speed, 6th gear spin. Meeke was on the pace of the WRC regulars even though he was held up by Qatar World Rally Team's Evgeny Novikov, although his rally ended when he rolled at high speed with only one stage to run. However, his performance left Sordo under pressure to perform to avoid losing his seat with the team.

Hirvonen finished 3rd on tarmac in Germany, his least favourite surface. Sordo was involved in rally long battle with Belgian Thierry Neuville and Finn Jari-Matti Latvala which lasted to the final stage. Sordo held a slim lead, but held on to win his first ever WRC event. It also meant that Citroën were the only team to win ADAC Rallye Deutschland since its addition to the WRC in 2002. Meeke competed in Australia in place of Sordo. Hirvonen had another consistent rally, but dropped from 2nd to 3rd on the final stage due to a puncture. Meeke showed strong pace again only to destroy his car after rolling down a steep bank.

Rallye de France-Alsace was due to be the final rally of Sébastien Loeb's WRC career. The rally would see many different leaders and a rally long battle between Loeb, Sordo, Ogier, Latvala and Neuville. Loeb's rally ended when he rolled the car into trees on the final morning. Sordo came close to another win but missed out to Ogier.

Rally de Catalunya would again see Sordo challenging for victory but the front left suspension broke on his car. Hirvonen managed to finish 3rd on the event. On the final event of the season, Wales Rally GB, recently crowned WRC2 champion and ex-F1 racer Robert Kubica made his WRC car debut with the team. He rolled during the Hafren stage on Friday morning, and subsequently rolled again on the Dyfi stage on Saturday morning. Mikko Hirvonen also had an accident on the Myherin stage which destroyed the car, although he and co-driver Jarmo Lehtinen were uninjured. Sordo had a disappointing final rally for the Citroën Team finishing 7th after a time penalty early on in the event.

=== 2014 season ===
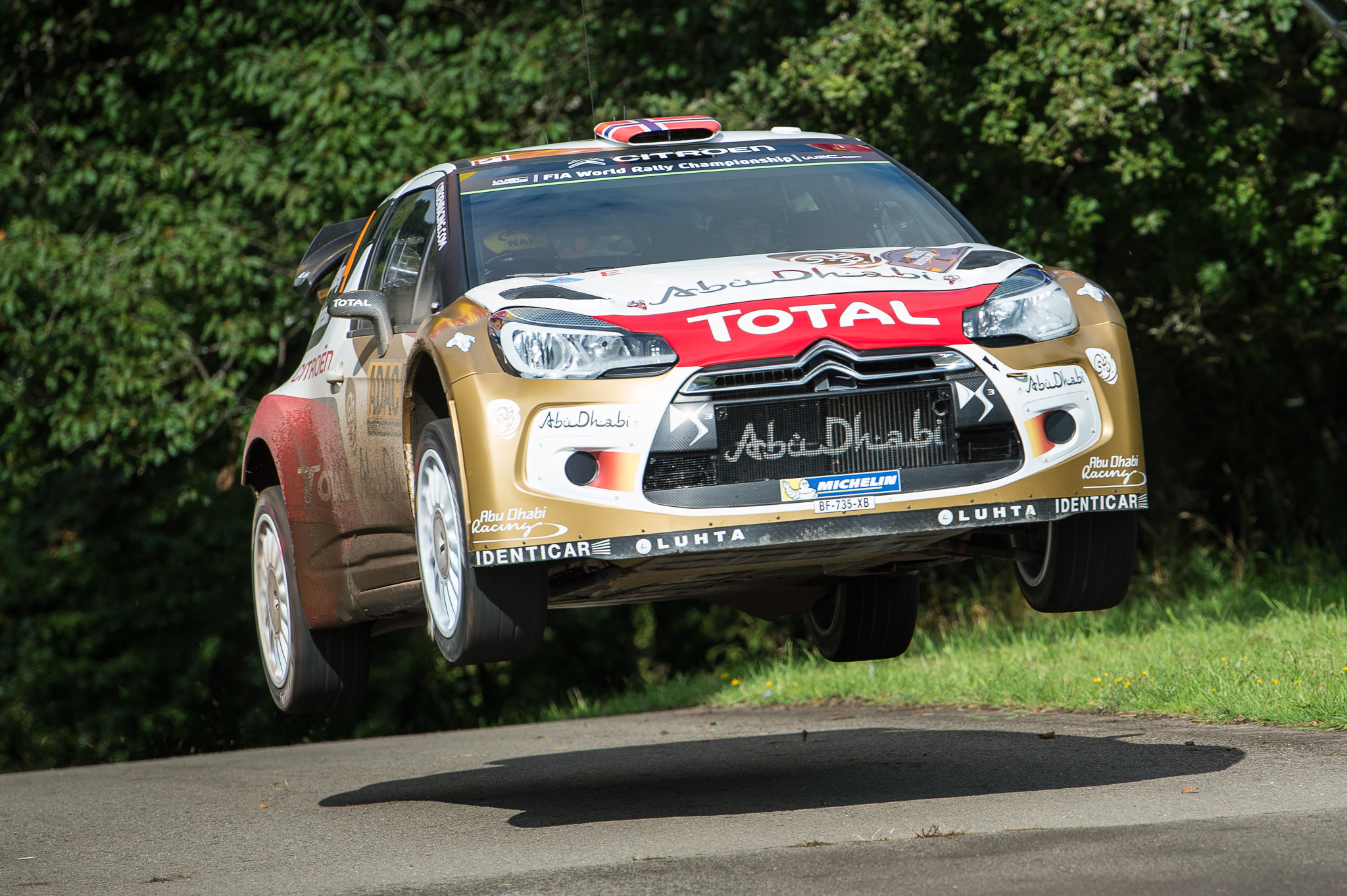
Citroën DS3 WRC at the 2014 Rallye Deutschland.

Norwegian driver Mads Østberg, Kris Meeke from Northern Ireland, and Khalid Al Qassimi from UAE, competed for Citroën in 2014 driving the DS3 WRC.

Citroën Racing finished second in the Championship, collecting eight podiums during the season. It was their first season without a win after 13 successful seasons in a row.

=== 2015 season ===
Østberg and Meeke continued as factory drivers. Loeb made a guest appearance in the Monte Carlo rally. He challenged Ogier for win at first but punctured his tyre. Also Citroën's protégé Stéphane Lefebvre drove for manufacturer points in Rally Australia, replacing injured Østberg, and he also drove a few rallies in the third factory car. Al-Qassimi drove several races during the season again.

Citroën's best result of the season was Rally Argentina. All three VW drivers retired due to engine problems and Meeke scored his first WRC victory. Østberg finished second and Al-Qassimi scored his season-best sixth place.

After the season, Citroën announced that they would withdraw from the 2016 championship, to use all their resources to developing their 2017 car.

=== 2016 season ===
In preparation of the 2017 season, Citroën took a sabbatical to develop C3 WRC. Meanwhile, semi-works Abu Dhabi Total WRT participated in eight European rallies. Meeke, who had signed a three-year contract with Citroën, Lefebvre and Al-Qassimi drove some races, as well as Craig Breen.

=== 2019 season ===
The car for the 2019 season was a Citroën C3 WRC driven by Sébastien Ogier and Esapekka Lappi with Julien Ingrassia and Janne Ferm as their co-drivers.

At the end of the season, Ogier left the team due to a performance clause in his contract. Citroën announced that they would be leaving the series due to no top-level drivers being available, ending the brand's involvement in the rally racing landscape.

== Cars ==
- Citroën Saxo S1600
- Citroën C2 S1600
- Citroën ZX Kit Car
- Citroën Xsara Kit Car
- Citroën Xsara T4/Citroën Xsara WRC
- Citroën C4 WRC
- Citroën DS3 WRC
- Citroën C3 WRC

== Gallery ==
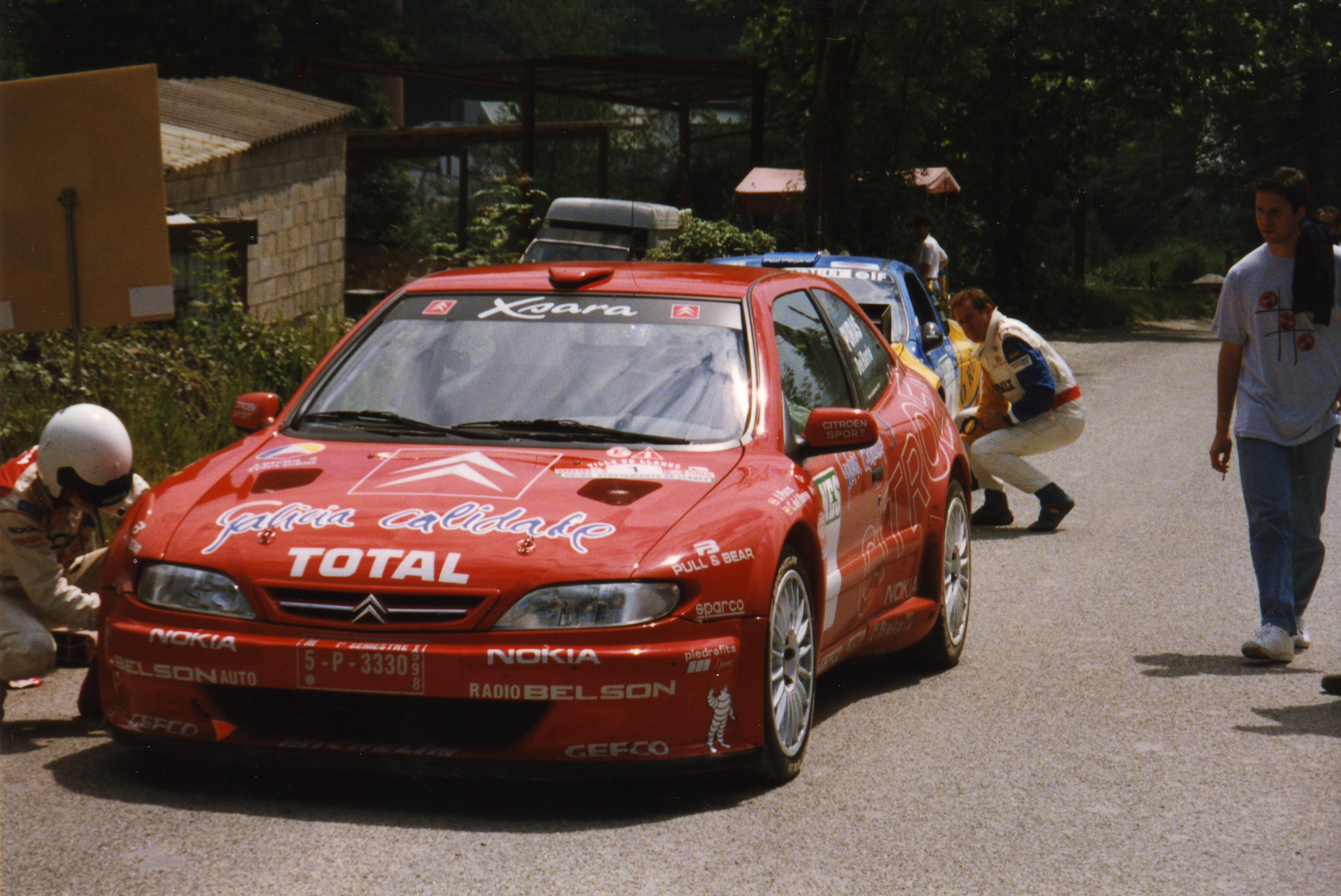
1998 Rallye Villa de Llanes

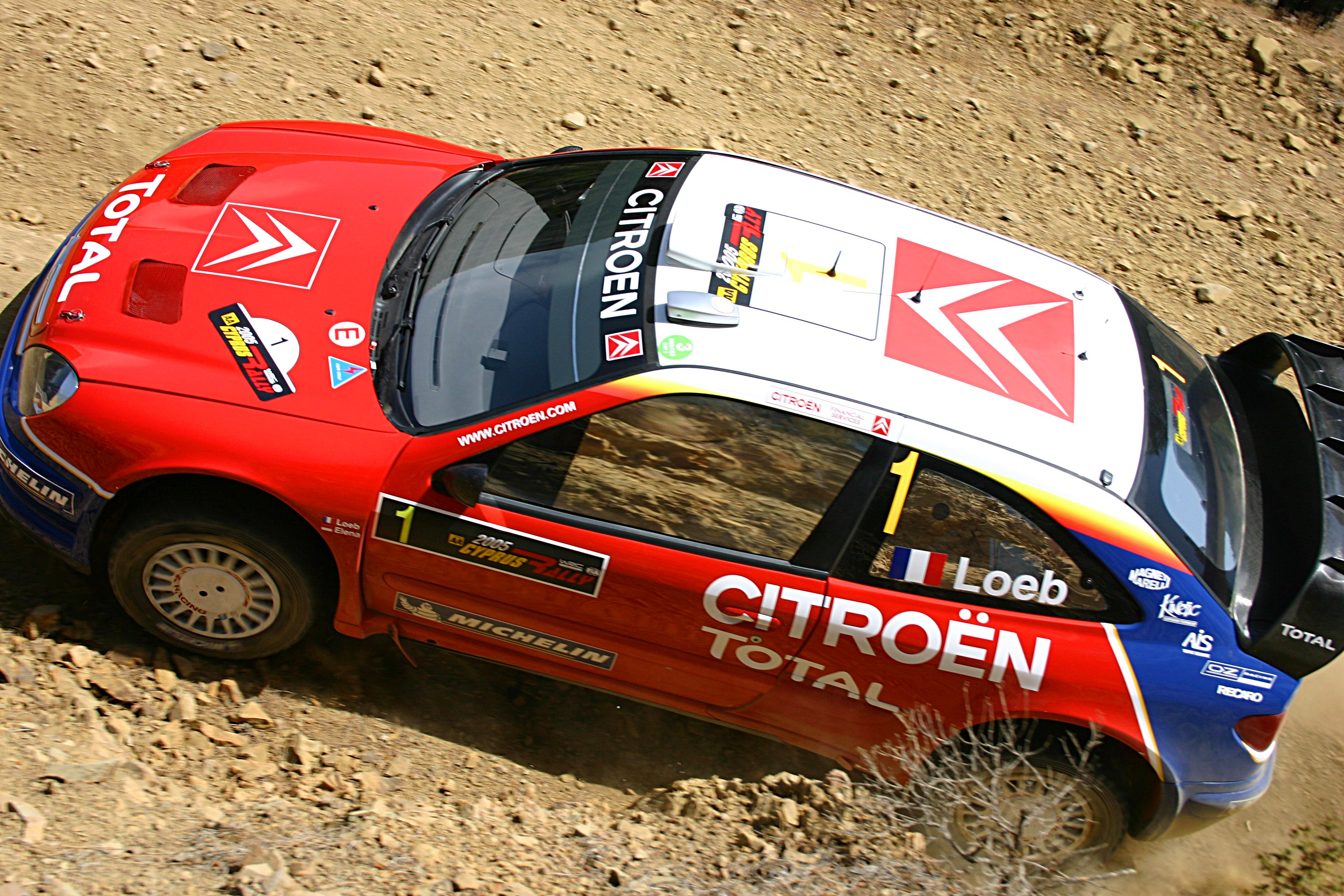
Loeb at the 2005 Rally Cyprus

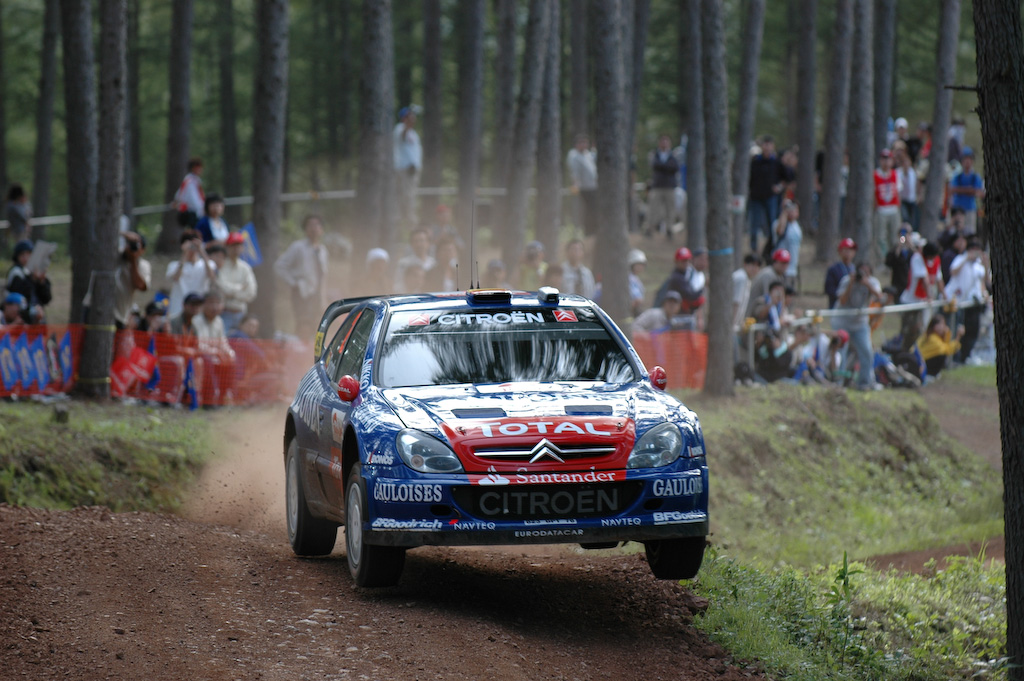
Sordo at the 2006 Rally Japan

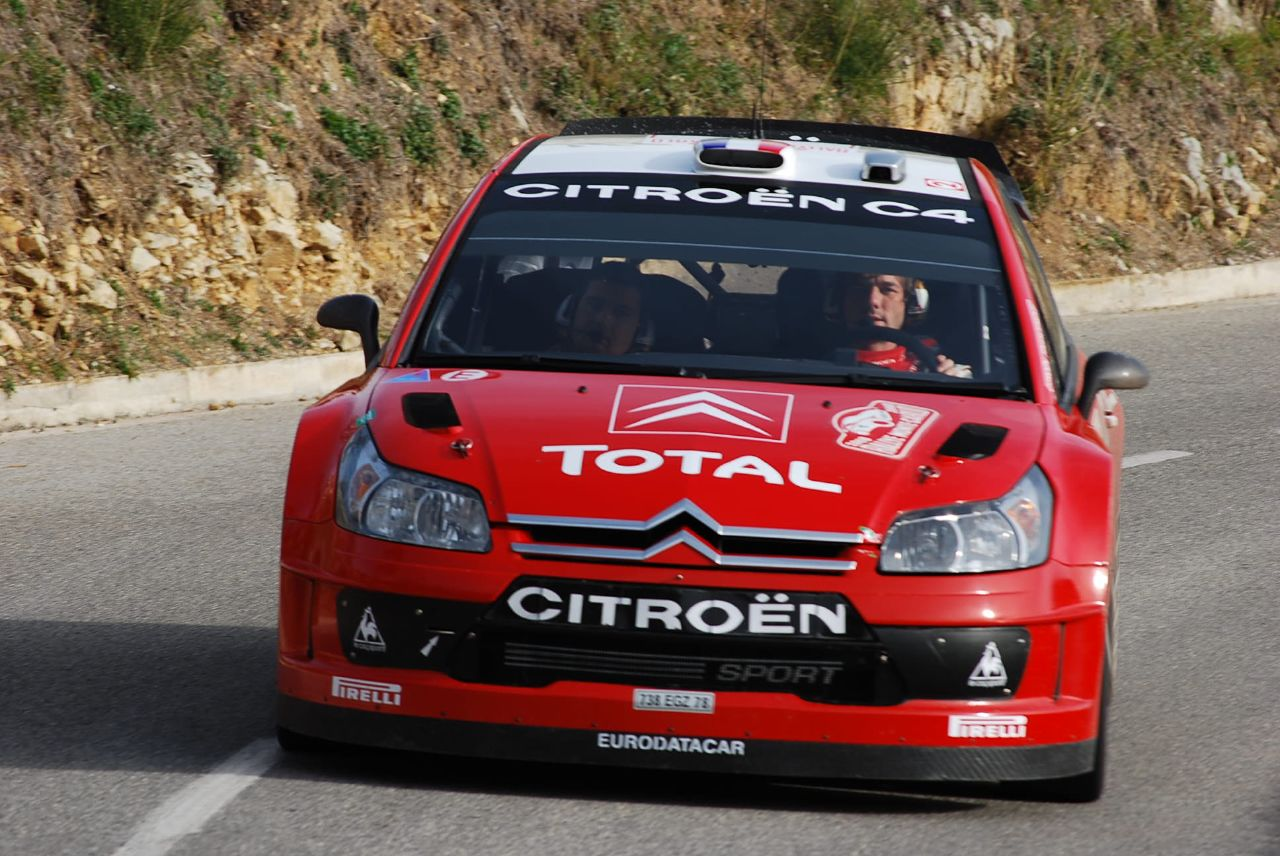
2008 Monte Carlo Rally.

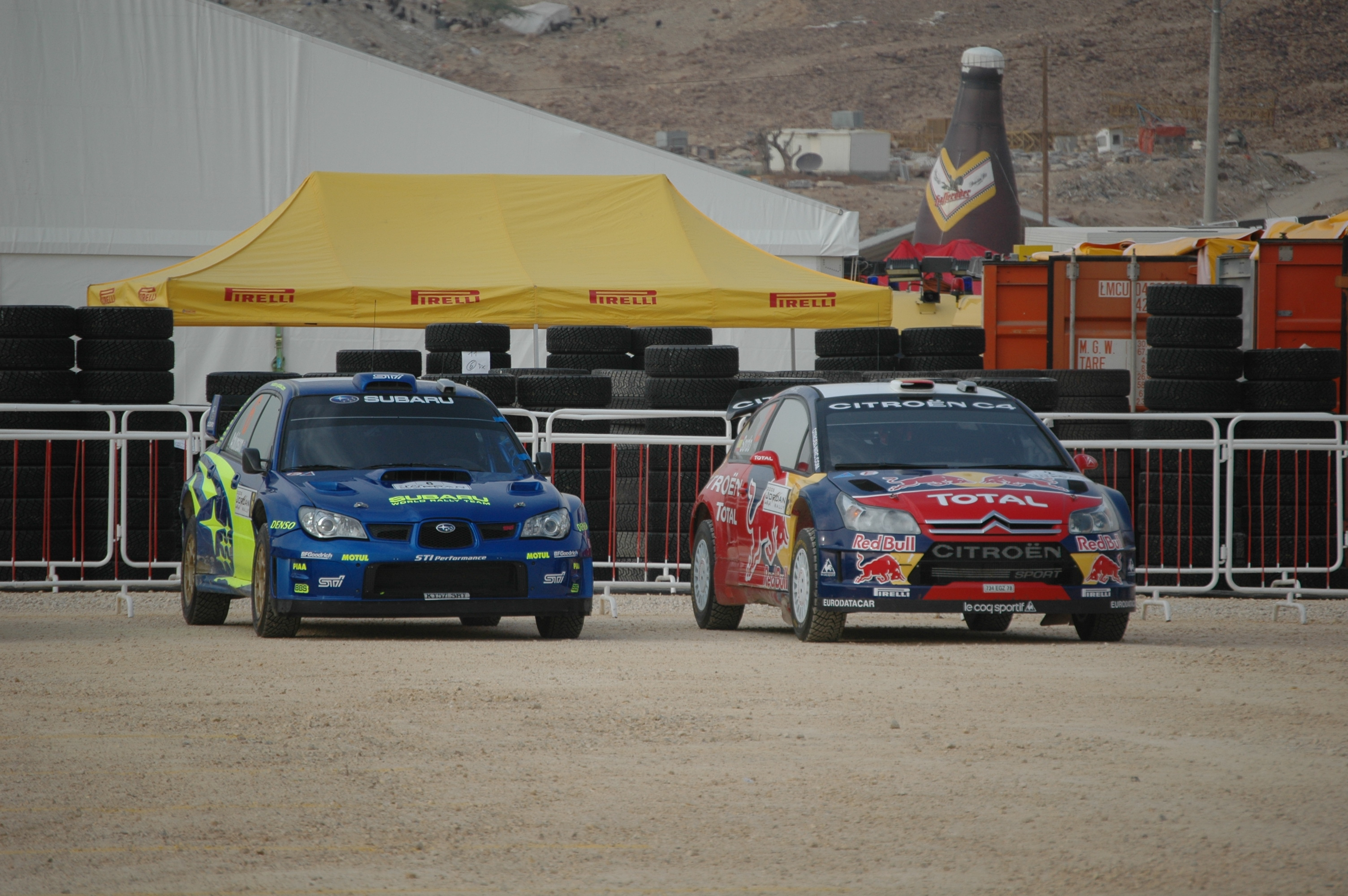
C4 WRC and Impreza WRC in the service park at the 2008 Jordan Rally.

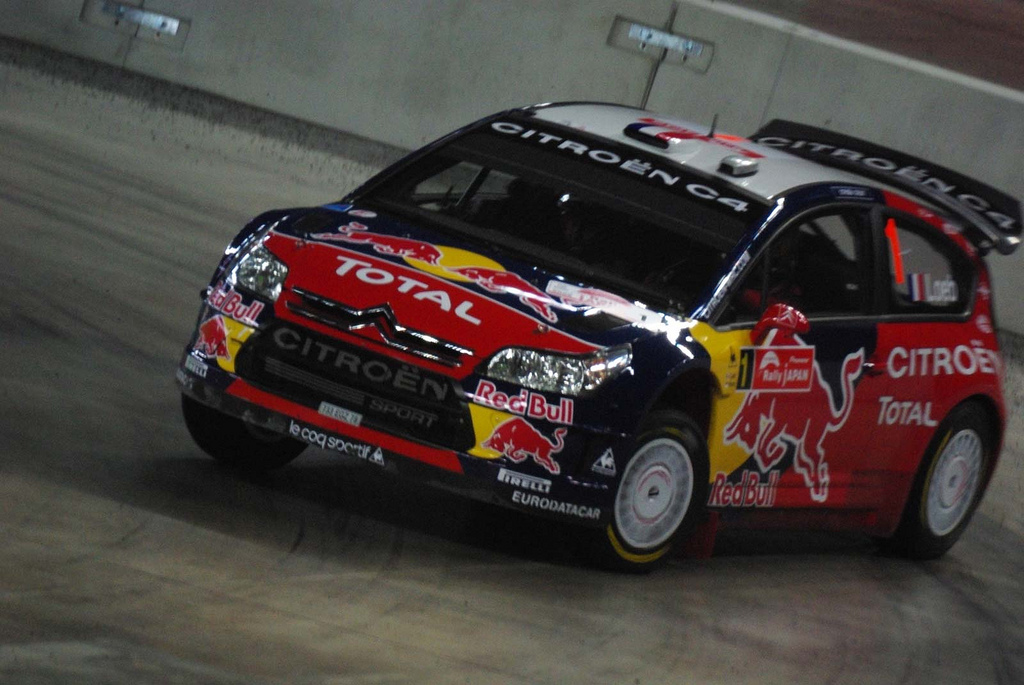
Sébastien Loeb – 2008 Rally Japan.

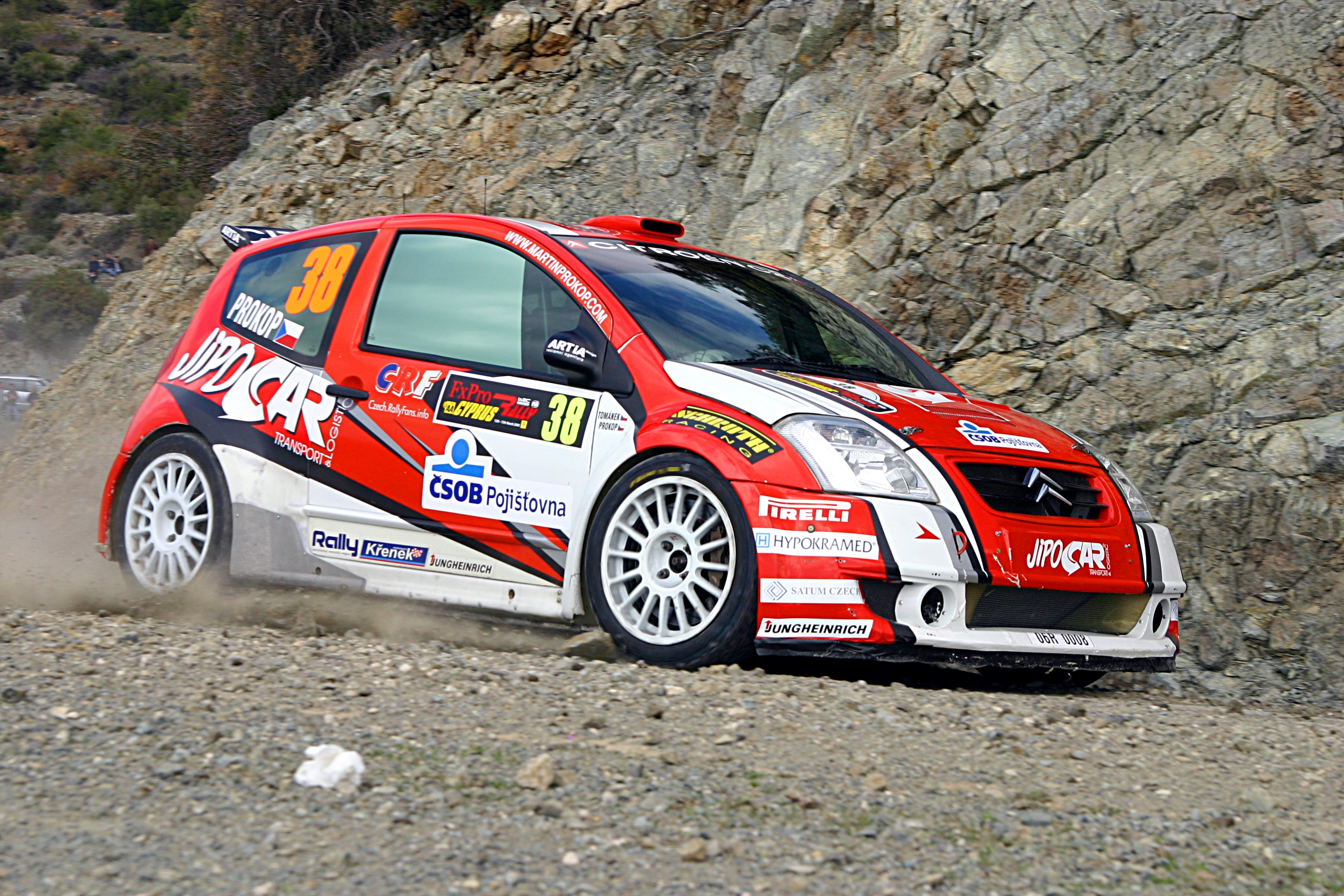
2009 Cyprus Rally

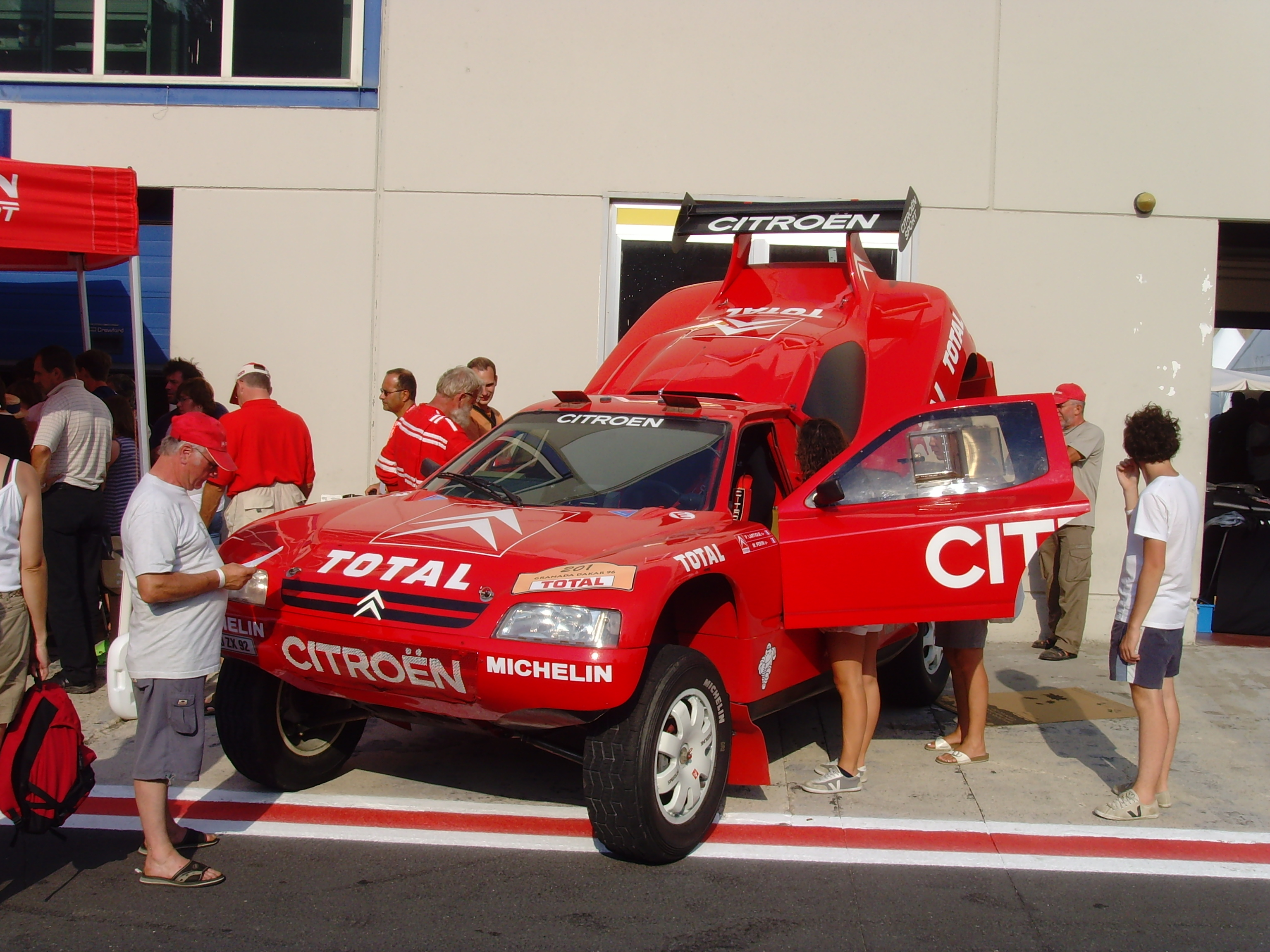
Citroën ZX Rally Raid, 5 times World Champion of Rally Raid

== See also ==
- Citroën Junior Team
- Qatar World Rally Team
