= Olivier Quesnel =

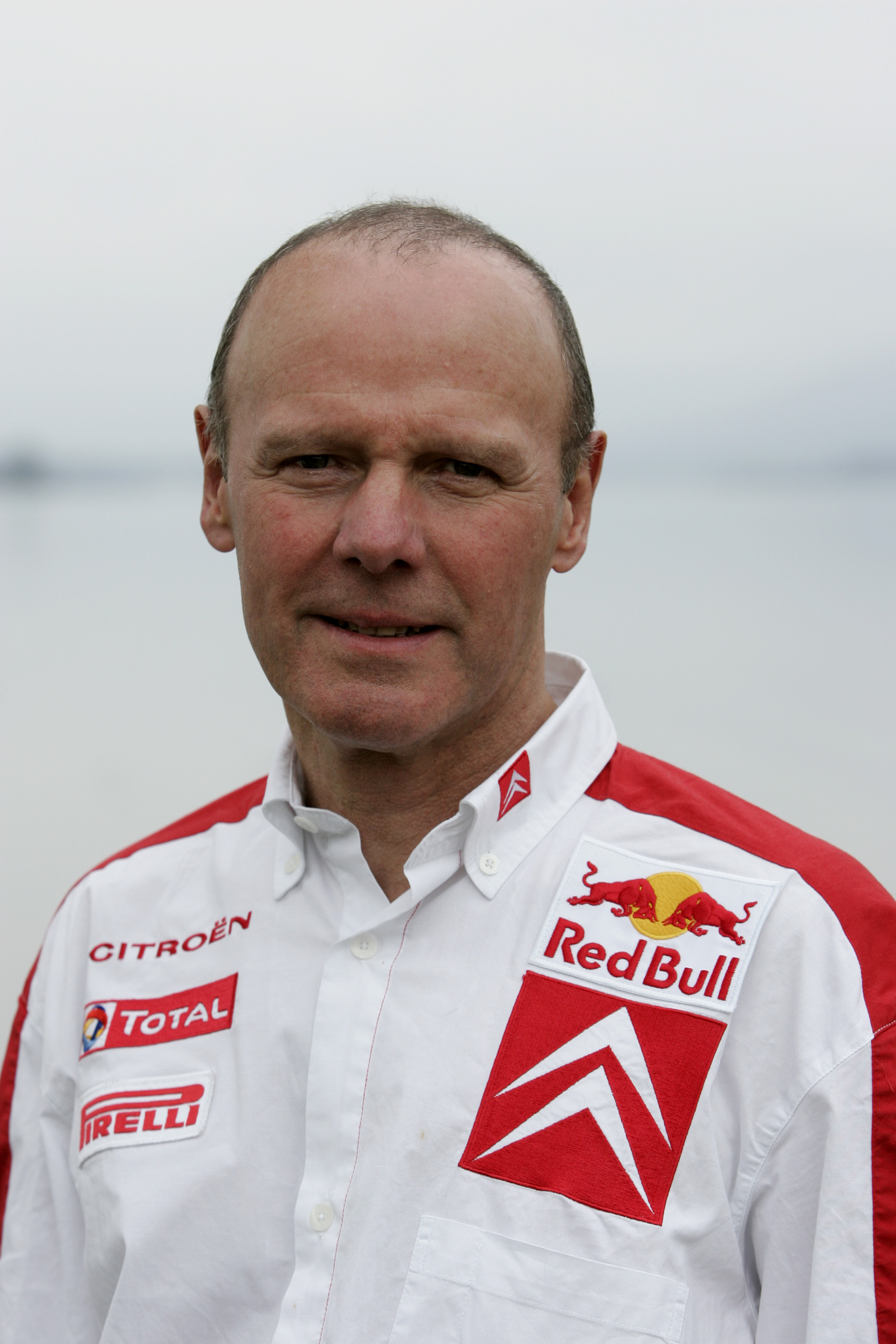
- Olivier Quesnel in 2008
- Born: 1950 (age 75–76)

Olivier Quesnel (born 1950) is a French press boss and director of automobile teams. In particular, he managed the competition departments of the two automobile brands Peugeot and Citroën, Citroën Racing and Peugeot Sport.

== Career ==
Olivier Quesnel participated in the creation of Peugeot Talbot Sport with Jean Todt in 1980, then worked within the Michel Hommell Group, notably as director of the weekly magazine Auto Hebdo.

In 2008, he was appointed head of Citroën Racing to replace Guy Fréquelin, who had retired. His first season was a success, as Citroën regained the two world rally championship titles for the first time since 2005. In the off-season, he was also appointed head of Peugeot Sport by the leaders of PSA. 2009 is like the previous year with the retention of two titles for Citroën in rallying and victory for Peugeot at the 24 Hours of Le Mans, Peugeot's first victory at Le Mans since 1993 and the first major success for Peugeot Sport since 2002. He was replaced by Yves Matton at the head of Citroën Racing on January 5, 2012.

In July 2012, he joined the group of Jacques Nicolet, as Director of Competition Activities of the JN Holding group, in charge of the international development of activities related to the various WEC and ELMS endurance championships, as well as other motor sport activities.
