= Pierre Budar =

French rally manager

- Born: 16 August 1964 (age 61)
- Occupation: Team principal
- Employer: Citroën World Rally Team

Pierre Budar (born 16 August 1964) is a French rally manager. He is the current team principal of Citroën World Rally Team. He was appointed to the role of Citroën World Rally Team team principal in the World Rally Championship in January 2018, replacing Yves Matton.
