= Citroën BX 4TC =

French rally car

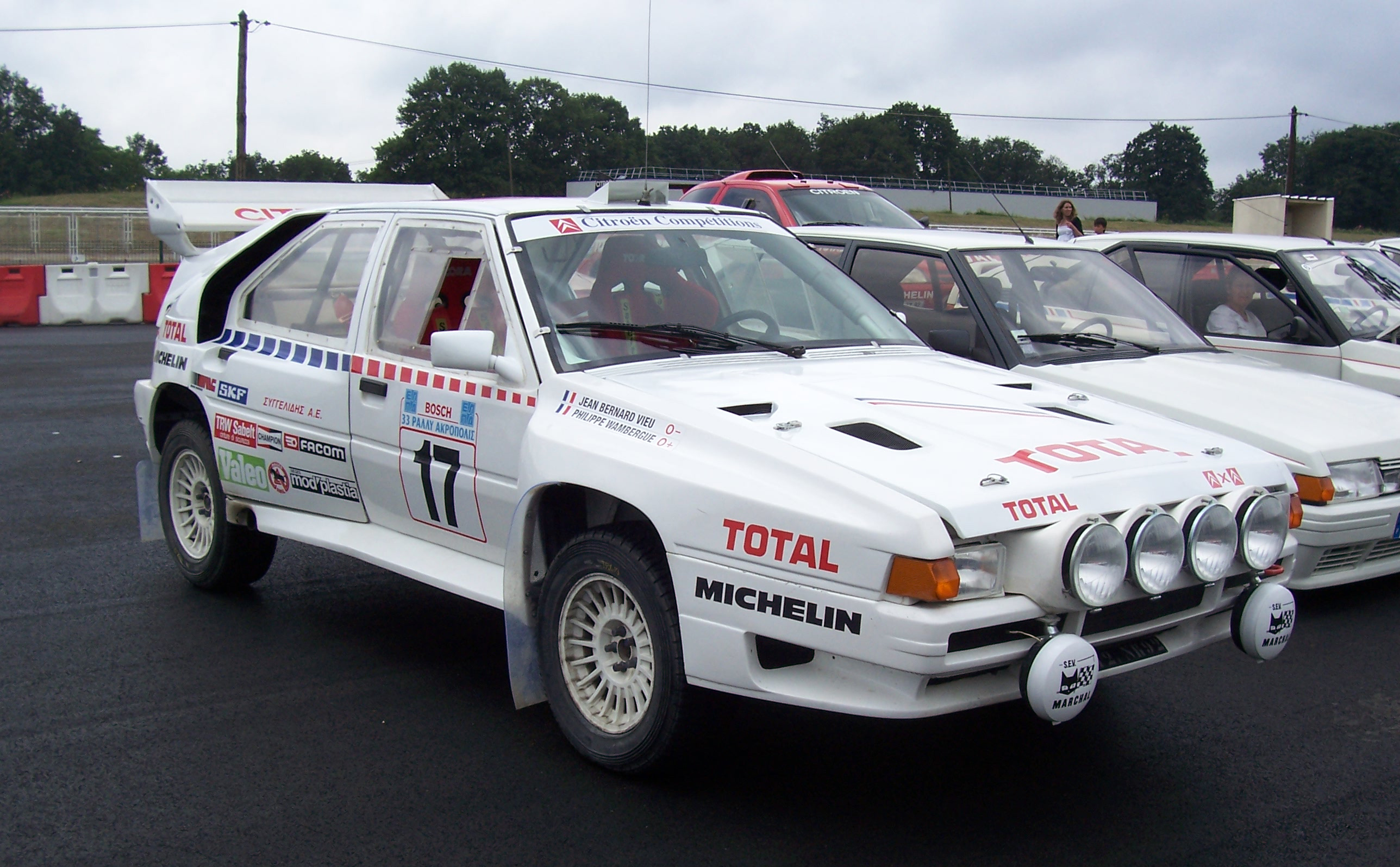
Citroën BX 4TC Evolution

The Citroën BX 4TC is a rally car, designed, developed and produced by French manufacturer Citroën; derived from the Citroën BX production car. A road-going, street-legal version was built to meet the requirements of the Group B category of the World Rally Championship. A total of 200 models were produced, as this was the production requirement.

== Rally version ==
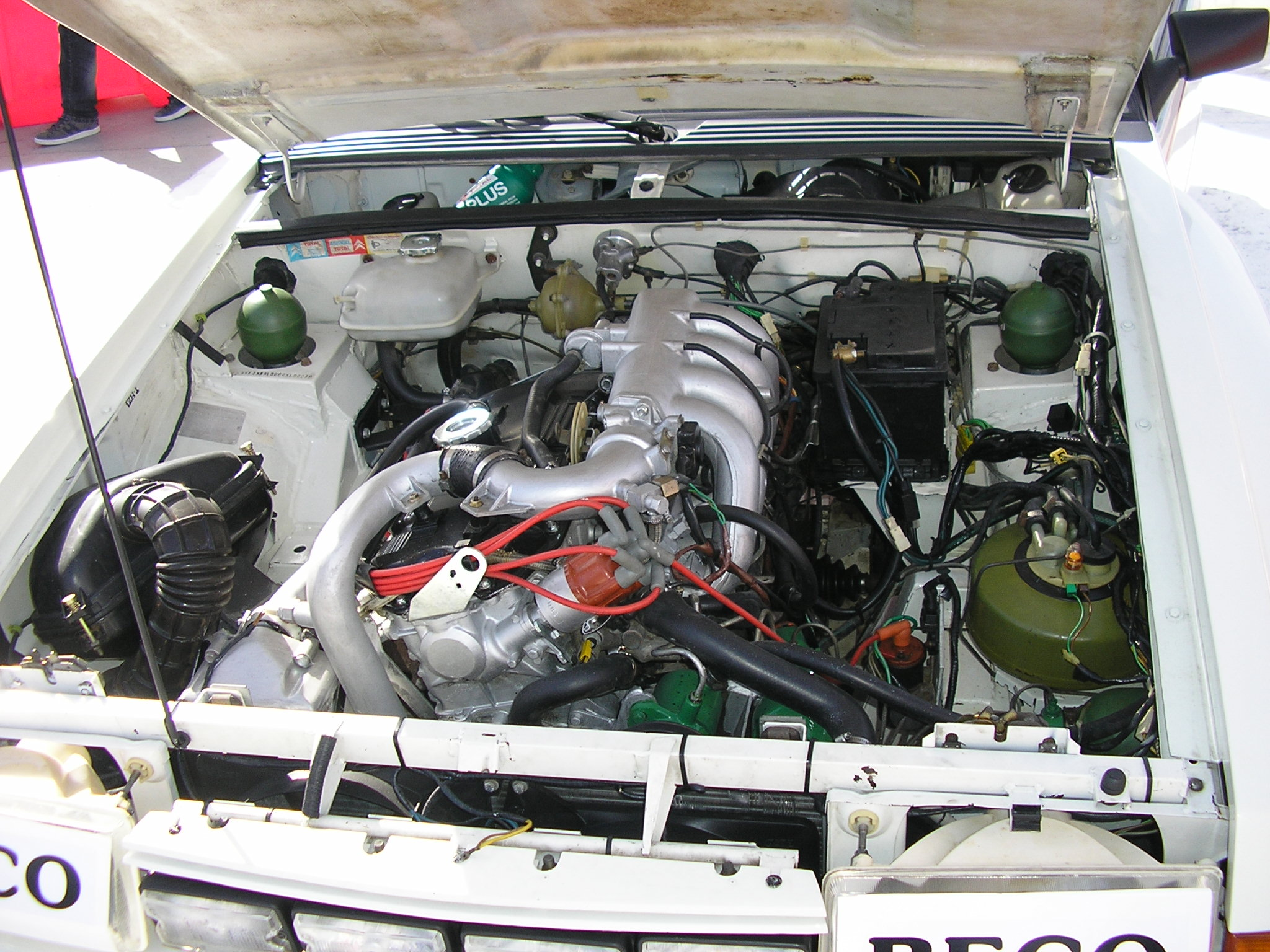
Citroën BX 4TC engine bay.

With the 1985 World Rally Championship as its objective, the development of the new Group B took place under the control of Citroën's commercial services. It is the BX which, from 1983, is chosen. The specifications prove to be restrictive in view of the ambitions: you have to keep the architecture of the BX and take as many series 1 parts as possible. The 20 cars are built by the Citroën competition department based in Trappes and the hulls by Heuliez. The first tests take place on the circuit in December 1985, but reveal major handicaps: high weight, lack of power, and hydraulic suspensions increasing understeer. After two retirements for breakage and going off the road at Monte-Carlo 1986, it was in Sweden that the BX obtained its best place, sixth, thanks to Jean-Claude Andruet. On their last participation in the Acropolis rally, all three BXs retired. Citroën then withdrew from the championship following the dramas in Portugal and the Tour de Corse, in order to improve the design.

Apart from experience in the World Rally Championship, the car was entered in rallycross in 1989 by Jacky Pivert, but without significant results for him.

In 1991, 1992 and 1993 Jean-Luc Pailler became triple French rallycross champion with his Turbo 4x4, as well as Division 2 European Champion in 1993. His BX was not a 4TC but a totally distinct prototype. (1900 engine)

The 4TC, therefore, did not enjoy much success during its short rallying career. In addition to the faults mentioned above, the unexpected stoppage of Group B in the year following its first entry did not give Citroën time to improve it much. The car had however aroused high expectations when its launch was announced, due to Citroën's past successes in rallying with the DS.

== Production version ==
Group B homologation requirements call for the manufacture and sale of 200 "customer" road cars. Only 86 vehicles (also made by Heuliez) found takers; Citroën destroyed the unsold examples. The engine is a 2142 cc N9TE, 16v inline-four with Bosch L-Jetronic fuel injected and a 7:1 compression ratio, rated at 200 hp DIN (147 kW) at 5,250 rpm. It has a cast-iron block, aluminum cylinder head, chain drive, dual overhead camshafts, and a Garrett turbocharger feeding through a air-air intercooler. With the engine positioned longitudinally, the BX 4TC carried a sizable front overhang. Originally designed by Simca for Chrysler 180, this engine was commonly found in the Peugeot 505 Turbo, where it had proved very robust and offered good potential for increased power. The unit provides power through a 5-speed manual gearbox.

The production BX 4TC sold poorly, owing to its lack of image due to the lack of success of the rally version and its performance, which fell short of competitors. However, the car's rarity, pure Citroën soul (carrying the signature hydropneumatic suspension and bold styling), and history in motorsport have led to an increase in popularity over time. Today, collectors covet the BX 4TC, which now trade for several tens of thousands of euros.

Manufacturer performance: 220 km/h and 0 to 100 km/h in 7.5 seconds.

Performance measured: 211 km/h, 0 to 100 in 9.1 seconds (Sport Auto).

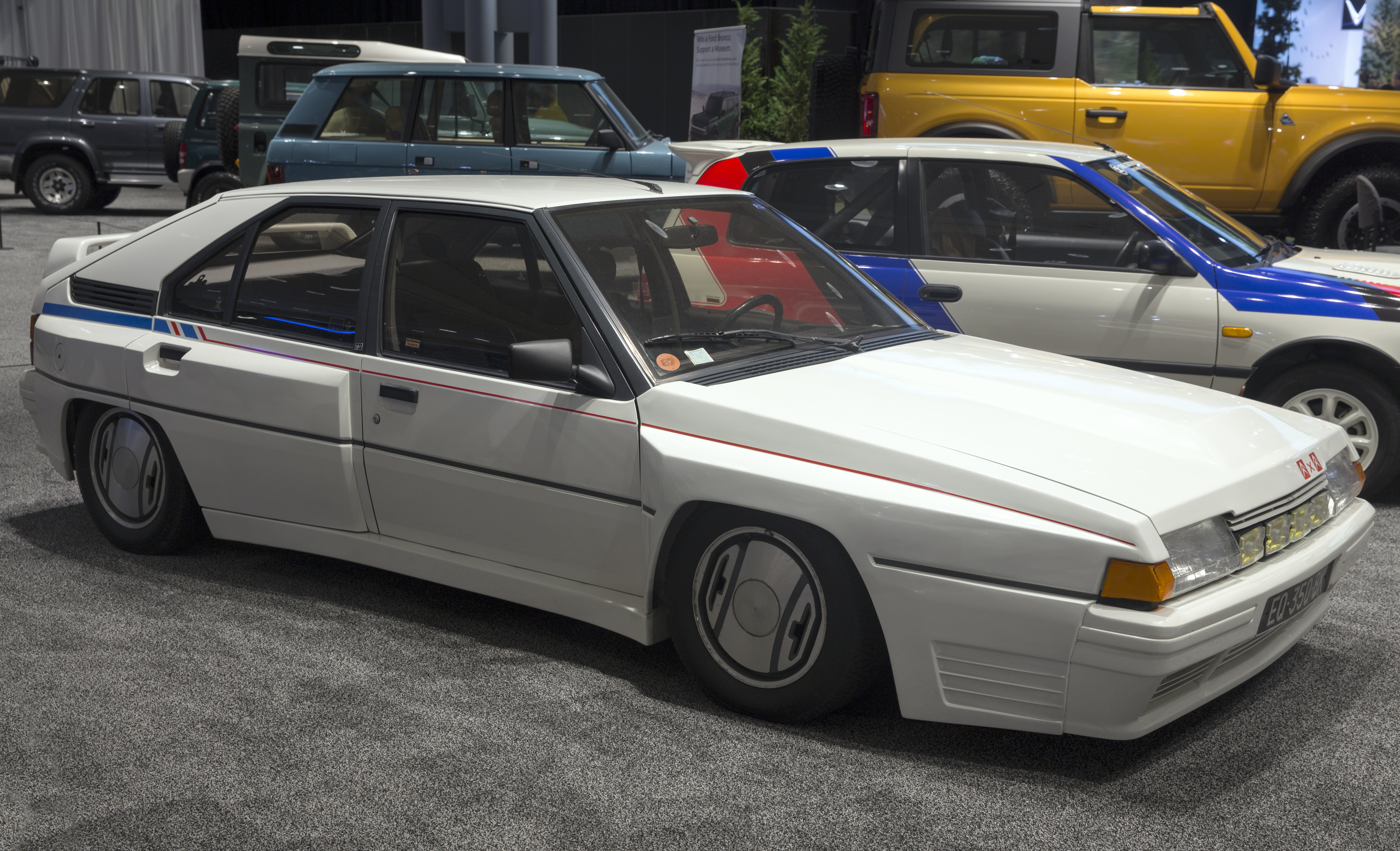
Citroën BX 4TC, road-going version

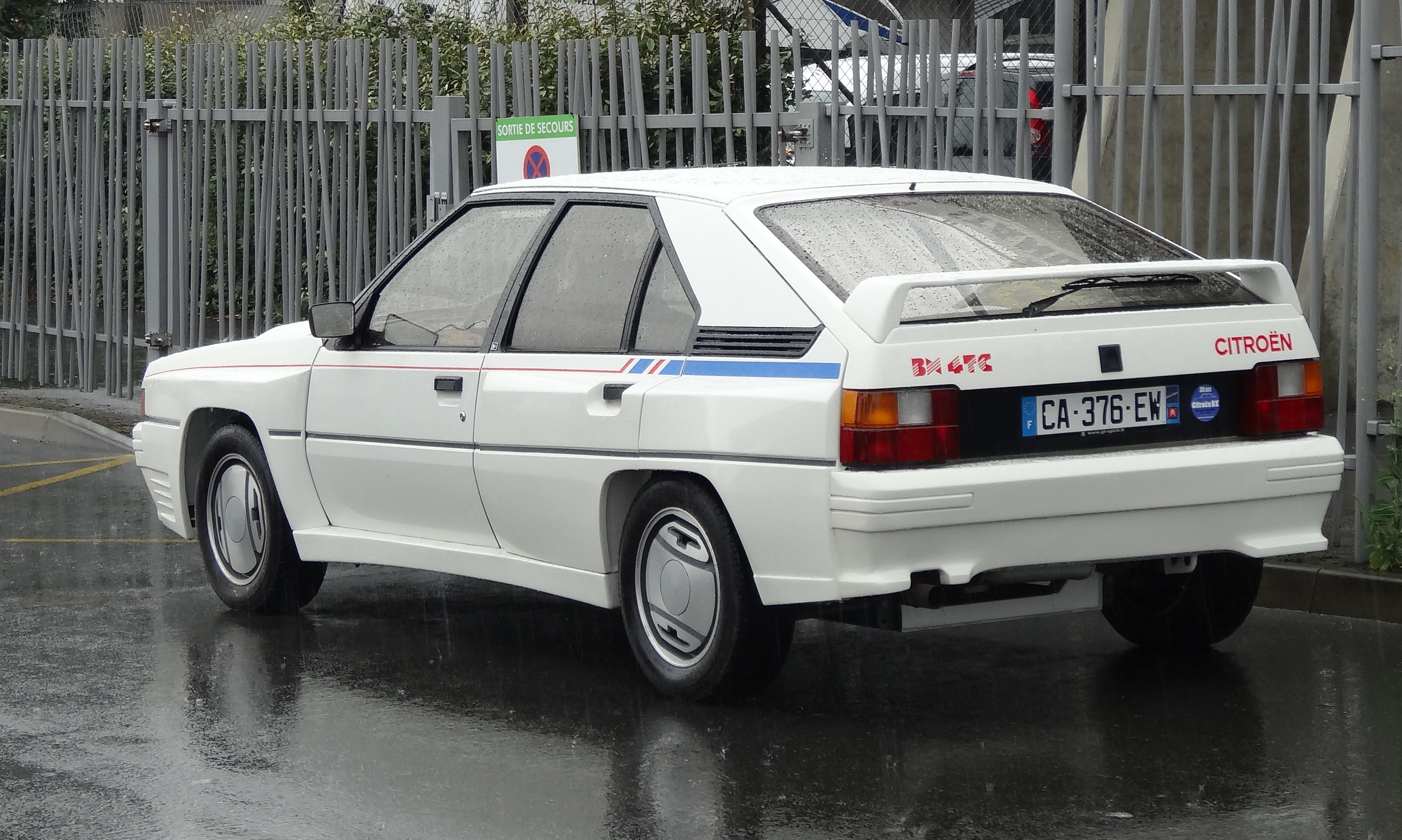
Rear view
