= Yves Matton =

Belgian rally motorsport car racing champion

- Born: 25 July 1967 (age 59); Courtrai, Belgium
- Education: Antwerp University (Bachelor of Business Administration)
- Occupation: Former FIA Rally Director

Yves Matton is a Belgian Rally Motorsport Car Racing champion and a former FIA Rally Director. He founded his self-named company MY Racing, before being appointed Logistics Manager for Citroën Sport, and later GM for Citroën Racing. He also served as a customer racing manager, and helped track the development of young talented drivers.

== History ==
Matton's love for motorsport began as he followed the Rallye du Condroz every year throughout his childhood in Huy. In 1986, after passing his driving test, he achieved one of his dreams when he took part in his favourite rally in an Opel Ascona.

His career as a rally driver was somewhat sporadic, but he nonetheless drove a wide variety of cars: Opel Manta 400, Ford Sierra Cosworth, Ford Escort Cosworth, etc. Some very well-known Belgian co-drivers accompanied him in the car, including Luc Manset, Stéphane Prévot and Jean-Marc Fortin. In 2013, he enjoyed his best ever result at the event, finishing third in a Citroën Xsara WRC alongside nine-time world champion co-driver, Daniel Elena.

After failing a doping test in 2017, Matton faced a 2-year probation.

== Education & Race Management ==
Whilst studying for a degree in business administration, Matton founded Prorace in 1990. Specializing in the preparation and rental of racing cars, the team quickly experienced success, especially with Janusz Kulig, who finished as runner-up in the Polish two-wheel drive championship, and Eddy Van den Hoorn, who won the Dutch Group N championship. In 1996, Prorace also became involved in the Citroën challenge with Frédéric Beco, Davy Vanneste and Thierry Bragard as drivers.

Between 1997 and 2001, Matton worked for the Belgian rally outfit, Future World. The team managed programmes with Subaru Impreza WRCs driven by Bruno Thiry and Renaud Vereydt, before becoming a local branch of the TTE (Toyota Team Europe) for national championships in Belgium, the Netherlands and Poland.

In 2001 and 2002, Matton pursued his career with Kronos Racing. He worked as Team Manager for Simon Jean-Joseph and Kris Princen, who both drove Peugeot 206 WRCs in the World Rally Championship.

== A first spell with Citroën ==
At the end of the year, Matton joined Citroën Sport as Logistics Manager. He then worked as WRC Coordinator before being appointed Team Manager by Guy Fréquelin. He then combined this position with the role of customer racing manager. This latter position gave him the chance to track the development of talented young drivers such as Dani Sordo and Kris Meeke. Competing in Citroën C2 Super 1600s, the Spaniard and the Briton finished first and third in the 2005 JWRC.

At the start of 2008, Matton left Citroën Sport to set up MY Racing. His new company maintained close ties with the French manufacturer, since it distributed racing spare parts in Belgium, the Netherlands, Luxembourg and Germany. MY Racing also organized the Citroën Racing Trophy until 2013. At the same time, Matton extended his involvement in the Middle East, managing the racing program of Saudi driver Yazeed Al-Rajhi.

== A second spell with Citroën Racing ==
On 5 January 2012, Matton was appointed Citroën Racing Team Principal, taking over from Olivier Quesnel. He was tasked by Frédéric Banzet, CEO of the Citroën Brand, with preparing effectively for the post-Sébastien Loeb era. While Loeb contested his last full WRC season, plans to compete in the World Touring Car Championship (WTCC) were considered.

2013 was a transitional year for Citroën Racing. After negotiating a partnership with Abu Dhabi Racing, Matton entrusted the works DS3 WRCs to Mikko Hirvonen, Dani Sordo and Khalid Al-Qassimi. Sébastien Loeb only took part in four WRC rallies, which left him time to work on development of the Citroën C-Elysée WTCC.

In 2014, Matton became Principal for both teams competing in the FIA World Championships. In the WRC, Kris Meeke and Mads Østberg drive the works DS3 WRCs, whilst Sébastien Loeb, Yvan Muller, José María López and Ma Qing Hua compete on behalf of Citroën Racing in the WTCC.

== FIA Rally Director ==
In the start of 2018, Yves Matton moved from Citroën to the FIA, becoming its Rally Director.

As head of the FIA Rally Department, Yves Matton overhauls the rally pyramid while supervising the implementation of the worldwide FIA Rally Star detection program. During his term, the WRC top class also began its switch to hybrid power with the extension of the promoter and all manufacturers involvement in the new era series. Yves Matton concluded as well an agreement between the FIA and ASO to launch the first FIA World Rally-Raid Championship in 2022.

On December 22, 2021, the FIA confirmed Matton's resignation as the Belgian took on new challenges, the governing body highlighting "a number of successes and significant achievements* during his term. On March 10, 2022, the FIA appointed Andrew Wheatley to replace Matton

== Back in Belgium ==
In 2022, Matton lead the creation and development of a new department, MY Gallery, a trading and advisory activity for investors in racing collection cars.
