= Jan de Rooy =

Dutch rally driver (1943–2024)

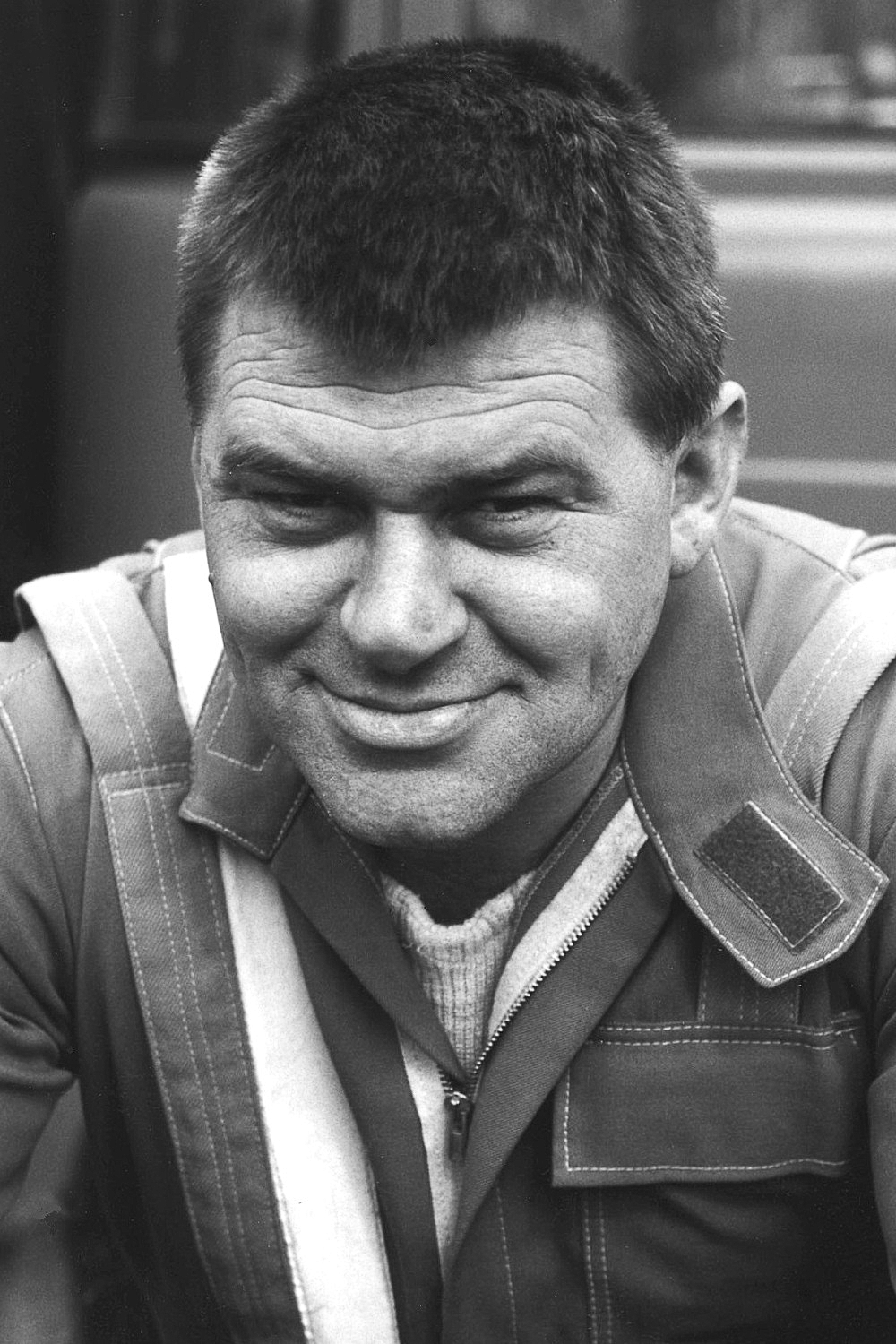
- De Rooy in 1979
- Born: Johannes de Rooy; 19 February 1943 Eindhoven, Netherlands
- Died: 30 January 2024 (aged 80) Middelbeers, Netherlands
- Nationality: Dutch
- Relatives: Gerard de Rooy (son)

Johannes "Jan" de Rooy (19 February 1943 – 30 January 2024) was a Dutch rally raid driver who specialised in the truck category with DAF vehicles. He was mainly known for his participation in the Dakar Rally and won it in 1987. He also won the 2009 edition of Africa Eco Race.

== Biography ==
Johannes de Rooy was born in Eindhoven in 1943. Together with his older brother Harry de Rooy he was the co-founder and former owner of the transportation company G.M. De Rooy & Sons in Son en Breugel. His son Gerard de Rooy, who is also a rally raid driver, now runs the company.

De Rooy got his start in racing as a teenager in motocross but became more widely known after his move to rallycross in 1969 where he was nicknamed "Oom Jan" (Uncle Jan) before his move to rally raid in 1982 where he became known as "L'Ours" (The Bear).

De Rooy died after a short illness on 30 January 2024, at the age of 80.

== Rallycross ==
Jan de Rooy's first experience and success in off-road four wheeled racing was in rallycross from 1969 to 1982. With his older brother, Harry, they saw great success in a range of vehicles including Mini Cooper, DAF 55 (with Gordini engine), DAF 555 Coupé 4WD (with a Ford engine), DAF 66M (with Ford engine), Toyota Corolla, Ford Escort RS1800 and Audi Quattro.

=== Rallycross results ===
- Dutch International Rallycross Champion 1970, 1971 (1970 and 1971 also National Champion), 1972, 1973 and 1979
- 1973: 4th overall Embassy Rallycross European Championship with DAF 55 Coupé (with Ford BDA engine)
- 1974: 5th overall Embassy Rallycross EC with DAF 55 Coupé and DAF 66M (each with Ford BDA motor)
- 1979: 2nd overall FIA European Rallycross Championship (Touring Cars) with Ford Escort RS1800 BDA 2.1
- 1980: Winner of the Dutch National Rallycross Cup for drivers with an international license
- 1982: 3rd overall FIA European Rallycross Championship (Division 2) with Audi Quattro

== Dakar Rally ==
1982 saw the move to and start of his Dakar career in which he would gain wider recognition. He saw success throughout the 1980s in which he participated in trucks that remain iconic.

The 1984 "Tweekoppige Monster" featured a cab at both ends with the rear cab housing a second engine so that each axle had its own 400 hp engine. The twin engined monster evolved in 1985 into the more aerodynamic "The Bull", named due to its appearance, with a 420 hp front engine and 450 hp rear engine.

1986 was the first year of the "TurboTwin". A factory backed effort with a steel tube monocoque frame reducing weight by over a ton from the previous year. It gained another increase in power to supply approximately 475 hp each and could propel the truck to 200kmh.

After his 1987 win, he was asked by the Middle Hotelschool of Heerlen to give a demonstration of his truck. After local residents complained of "an idiot speeding in a truck without muffler" De Rooy was clocked by police driving 109 km/h. He was jailed for the night, received a fine of 600 Dutch guilder and his license was suspended for three months. He was however allowed to drive commercially for his company.

1988 was the final evolution of the twin engine trucks with the "X1". It boasted 1200 hp thanks to two 11.6L three turbo engines developing 600 hp each and could compete with the leading cars. There is a now infamous video of the X1 overtaking the Peugeot 405 T16 of Ari Vatanen at over 200 km/h.

De Rooy's success continued when he started participating again after a 14-year hiatus in 2002 with three top ten finishes in six entries.

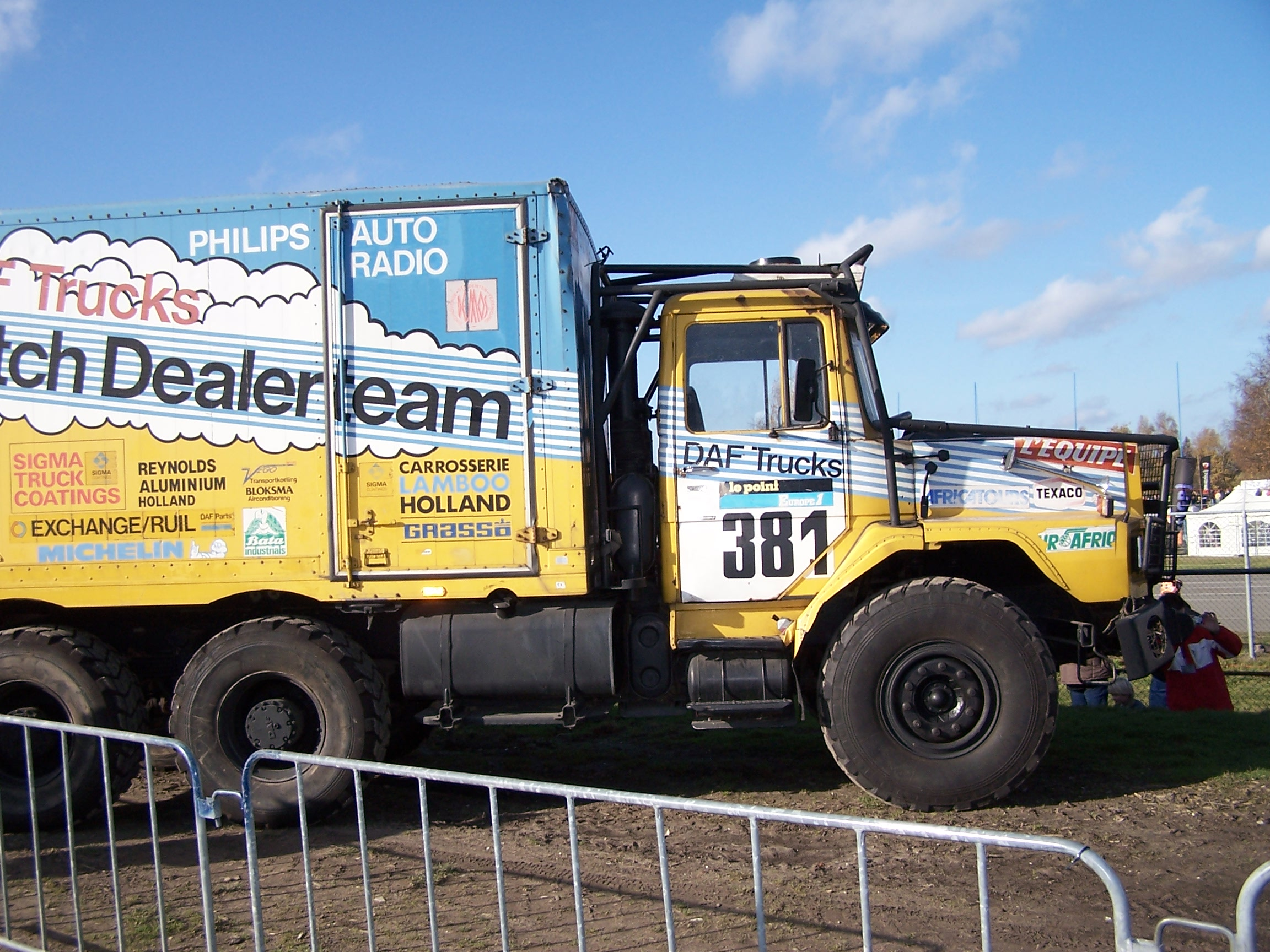
DAF "De Neus" Dakar 1982

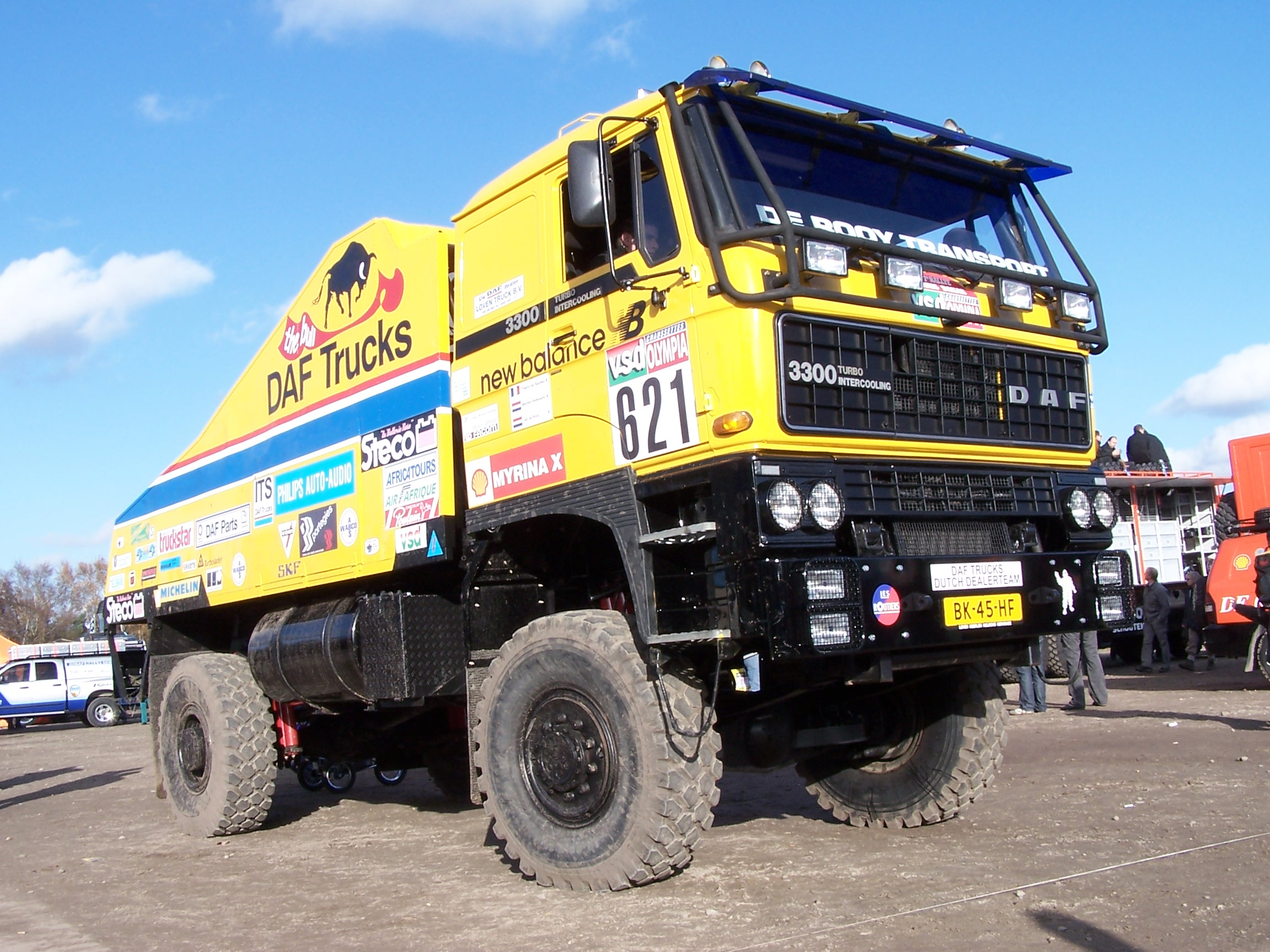
DAF "The Bull" Dakar 1985

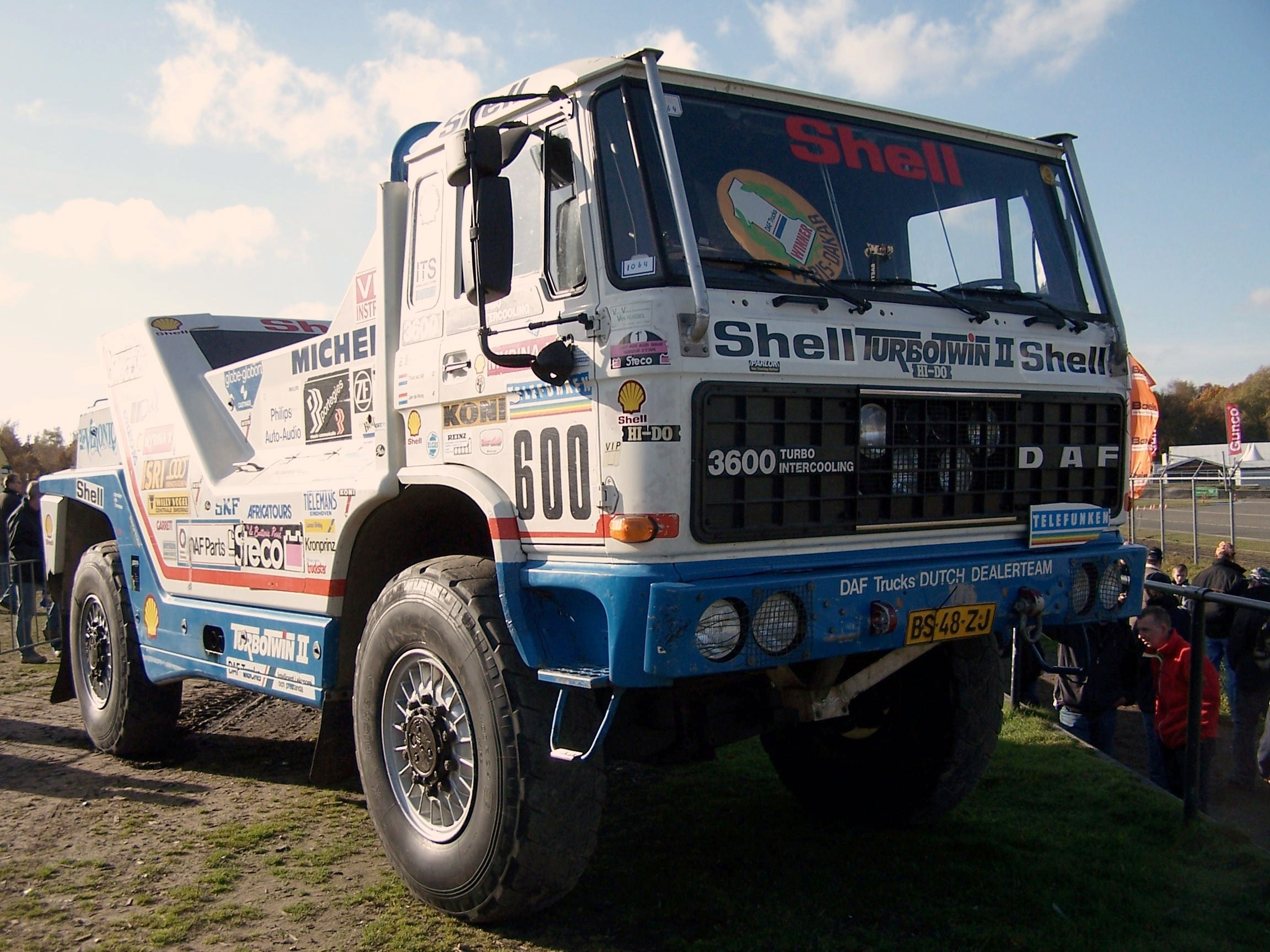
DAF TurboTwin II Dakar 1987

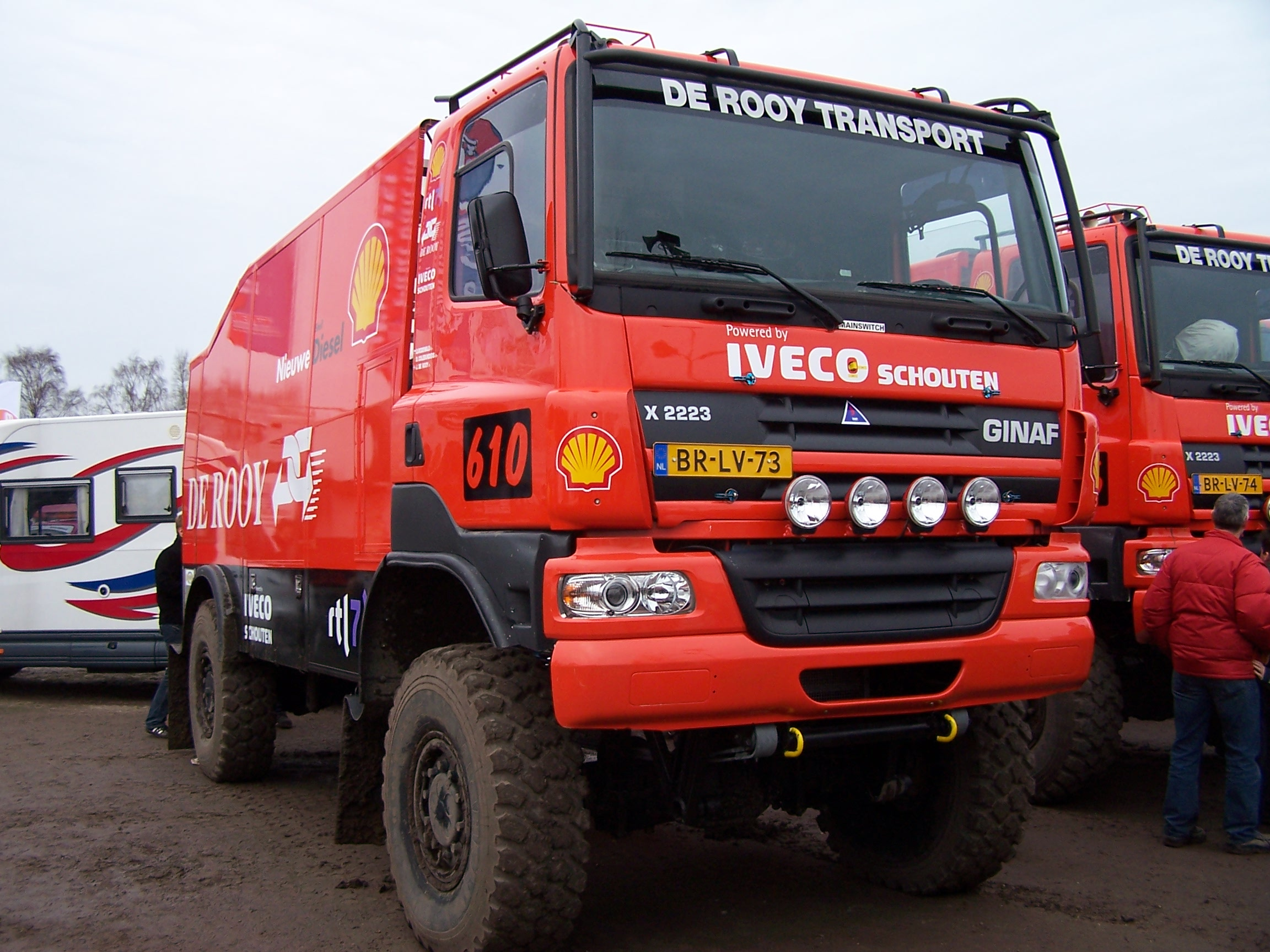
Ginaf X2223 Dakar 2008

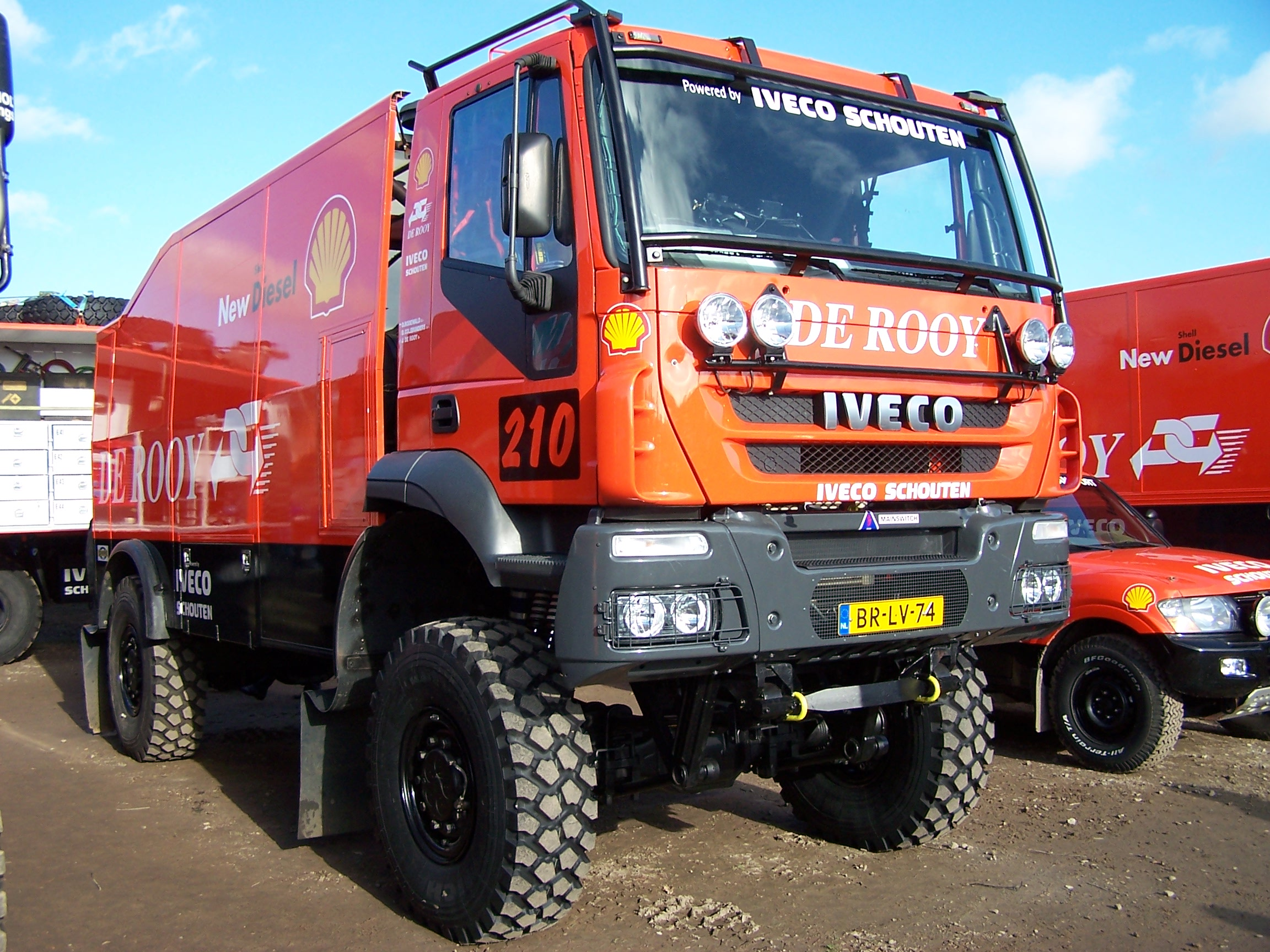
Iveco Trakker 4x4 2009

Year	Number	Co-Driver/Mechanic	Team	Make/Model	Position
1982	381	(Netherlands) Gérard Straetmans	Team De Rooy Transport	DAF NTT2800 "De Neus" (The Nose)	3rd (67th General Classification)
1983	342	(Netherlands) Joop Roggeband (Belgium) Yvo Geusens	Team De Rooy Transport	DAF FA3300 4x4 "De Koffer" (The Suitcase)	3rd (34th General Classification)
1984	521	(Netherlands) Joop Roggeband (Belgium) Yvo Geusens	Team De Rooy Transport	DAF F3300 4x4 "Tweekoppige Monster" (Two Headed Monster)	DNF
1985	621	(France) Thierry De Saulieu (Netherlands) Martinus Ketelaars	Team De Rooy Transport	DAF F3300 4x4 "The Bull"	2nd (15th General Classification)
1986	601	(France) Thierry De Saulieu (Belgium) Yvo Geusens	Team De Rooy Transport	DAF FAV 3600 4x4 TurboTwin	DNF (Stage 15)
1987	600	(Netherlands) Theo Van De Rijt (Belgium) Yvo Geusens	Team De Rooy Transport	DAF FAV 3600 4x4 TurboTwin II	1st (15th General Classification)
1988	600	(Belgium) Hugo Duisters (Belgium) Yvo Geusens	Team De Rooy Transport	DAF TurboTwin 95 X1	DNF (Withdrawn)
2002	410	(Netherlands) Gérard de Rooy (Belgium) Yvo Geusens	Team Jan de Rooy	DAF FAV CF85 4x4	6th
2003	409	(Belgium) Hugo Duisters (Belgium) Yvo Geusens	Team Gauloises/De Rooy	DAF FAV CF85 4x4	4th
2004	411	(Belgium) Dany Colebunders (Belgium) Hugo Duisters	Team Gauloises/De Rooy	DAF FAV CF75 4x4	DNF (Stage 8)
2005	521	(Belgium) Dany Colebunders (Belgium) Clemens Smulders	Team Gauloises/De Rooy	DAF FAV CF75 4x4	6th
2006	506		Team Gauloises/De Rooy	DAF FAV CF75 4x4	DNS (Start denied due to problems with FIA homologation of the truck)
2007	502	(Belgium) Dany Colebunders (Belgium) Clemens Smulders	Team Gauloises/De Rooy	Ginaf X 2222 4x4	DNF (Stage 5)
2008	610		Team De Rooy	Ginaf X 2223 4x4	Rally cancelled

== Other rally ==
Year	Race	Number	Team	Make/Model	Position
2008	Africa Eco Race (Morocco) Nador - (Mauritania) Chinguetti - (Senegal) Dakar	301	Team De Rooy	Iveco Trakker 4x4	1st
2009	Silk Way Rally (Russia) Kazan - (Kazakhstan) Zhanaozen - (Turkmenistan) Ashgabat	205	Team De Rooy	Iveco Trakker 4x4	9th
