= Gaston Rahier =

Belgian motorcycle racer

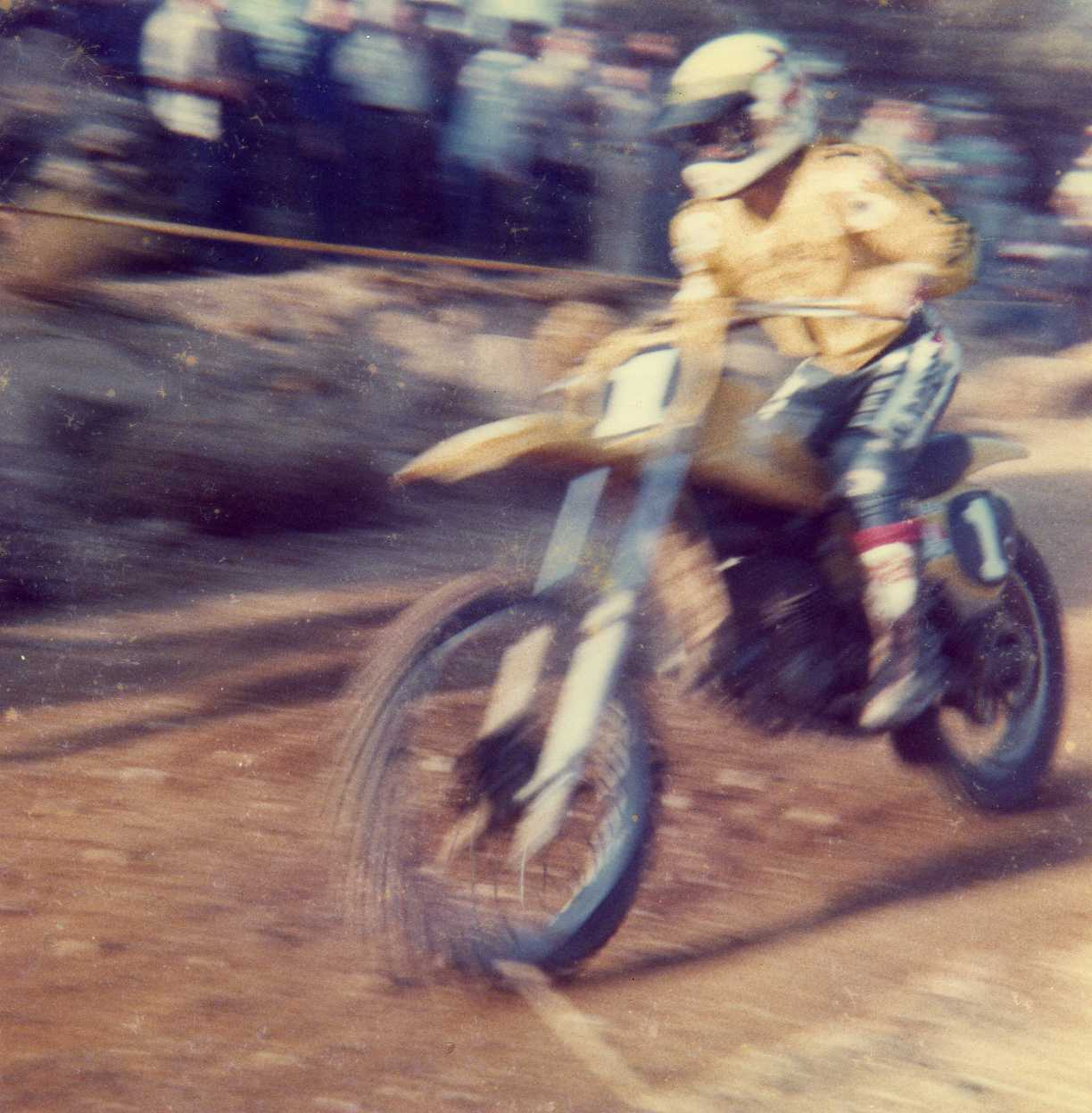
- Rahier in 1978
- Nationality: Belgian
- Born: 1 February 1947 Herve, Wallonia
- Died: 8 February 2005 (aged 58) Paris, France

Motocross career
- Years active: 1967–1983
- Teams: ČZ, Ossa, Suzuki, Yamaha, Gilera
- Championships: 125cc- 1975, 1976, 1977
- Wins: 30

Gaston Rahier (1 February 1947 – 8 February 2005) was a Belgian professional motocross racer. He competed in the Motocross World Championships from 1967 to 1983, most prominently as a member of the Suzuki factory racing team where he won three consecutive FIM 125cc Motocross World Championships. After his motocross career, he competed in long distance Rally Raid racing and was a two-time winner of the prestigious Paris-Dakar rally. In 1977, Rahier was named the recipient of the Belgian National Sports Merit Award.

== Motocross racing career ==
Rahier was born in Herve, Wallonia, Belgium on 1 February 1947. At the age of 20, he competed in his first Motocross World Championship event at the 1967 250cc Belgian Grand Prix as a privateer aboard a ČZ motorcycle. Despite his small stature (He stood 5 ft 3 in (1.60 m) tall), he also competed in the larger 500cc class where he scored his first World Championship point at the 1968 500cc Belgian Grand Prix.

Rahier joined the Suzuki factory racing team in 1973 competing in the 250cc World Championship in support of six-time World Champion, Joël Robert. He won the first overall victory of his career with Suzuki at the 1974 250cc West German Grand Prix where he finished ahead of perennial World Championship contenders, Gennady Moiseyev and his Suzuki teammates, Sylvain Geboers and Joël Robert. Rahier was a member of the victorious Belgian team at the 1974 Trophée des Nations event in Vesoul, France on 1 September.

As the sport of motocross experienced a surge in popularity during the early 1970s, the FIM introduced the 125cc Motocross World Championship in 1975. The Suzuki team entered Rahier into the new class, and he proceeded to dominate the season by winning eight out of twelve Grand Prix events to win the inaugural 125cc Motocross World Championship. He also helped the Belgian team reclaim the Trophée des Nations event on 7 September 1975.

Rahier successfully defended his 125cc title in 1976 and was a member of victorious Belgian teams at both the Motocross des Nations and Trophée des Nations events. Rahier's title defense in the 1977 season was made more difficult by the strong opposition presented by Yamaha factory rider Gérard Rond who won three Grand Prix events. Rahier was able to prevail by winning seven of twelve events to win his third consecutive 125cc motocross world championship, setting a record of 29 career 125cc Grand Prix victories. In the 1978 125cc Motocross World Championship, Rahier finished the season in second place behind his Suzuki teammate Akira Watanabe. On 10 September 1978, he helped the Belgian team win the Trophée des Nations event for the fourth and final time of his career.

Rahier left the Suzuki team and raced a Yamaha to a third place finish in the 1979 125cc Motocross World Championship behind Suzuki teammates Harry Everts and Akira Watanabe. He raced for the Gilera factory racing team in the 125cc motocross world championships in 1980 and 1981. Rahier moved back to the 250cc class in 1982 riding a Suzuki. He suffered a serious hand injury in the 1983 season that ended his professional motocross career.

Rahier won 53 individual heat races and 30 Grand Prix victories during his world championship racing career. He won three 125cc motocross world titles (1975-1977) and six Belgian motocross national championships. He was a member of six victorious Belgian Trophée des Nations teams (1970, 1971, 1974-1976, 1978), and one victorious Belgian Motocross des Nations team (1976).

== Later motorsport racing career ==
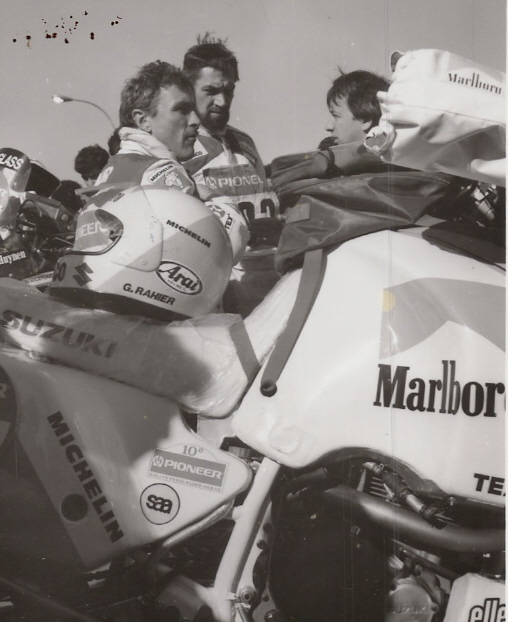
Rahier (left) during the 1988 Paris-Dakar Rally.

After recovering from his injury, Rahier began a successful off-road racing career competing in rally raid events. As a member of the BMW factory racing team, he entered the grueling, long distance 1983 Paris-Dakar Rally. A mechanical failure forced him to abandon the rally while he was leading the event however, he returned to win the 1984 Dakar Rally. He successfully defended his title by winning the 1985 Dakar Rally.

Rahier also competed for BMW in the 1985 Baja 1000 desert race in Baja California. Rahier and his co-rider Eddy Hau won Class 30 for riders over 30 years of age, and finished eighth overall ahead of all the cars and trucks entered in the race. In 1985, Rahier and long-distance runner Vincent Rousseau were honored as co-winners of the Belgian Sportsman of the Year award. Rahier was also a three-time winner of the Rallye des Pharaons (1984, 1985, 1988).

In the late 1980s, Rahier competed in sports car and touring car racing, taking part in the 1987 24 Hours of Le Mans and the 1987 Spa 24 Hour endurance races.

Rahier died in Paris on 8 February 2005, after a long battle with cancer.

== Motocross Grand Prix Results ==
Points system from 1952 to 1968:

Position	1st	2nd	3rd	4th	5th	6th
Points	8	6	4	3	2	1

Points system from 1969 to 1980:

Position	1	2	3	4	5	6	7	8	9	10
Points	15	12	10	8	6	5	4	3	2	1

Year	Class	Team	1		2		3		4		5		6		7		8		9		10		11		12		13		14		Pos	Pts
Year	Class	Team	R1	R2	R1	R2	R1	R2	R1	R2	R1	R2	R1	R2	R1	R2	R1	R2	R1	R2	R1	R2	R1	R2	R1	R2	R1	R2	R1	R2	Pos	Pts
1967	250cc	ČZ	ESP -	ESP -	CH -	CH -	FRA -	FRA -	BEL; 17	BEL; 19	GER -	GER -	NED -	NED -	ITA -	ITA -	UK -	UK -	SWE -	SWE -	FIN -	FIN -	USR -	USR -	POL -	POL -					-	0
1968	250cc	ČZ	ESP; 13	ESP; 10	BEL; 7	BEL; 12	CZE -	CZE -	FRA; 15	FRA; 14	NED -	NED -	GER -	GER -	LUX; 15	LUX; 14	POL -	POL -	USR -	USR -	YUG -	YUG -	FIN -	FIN -	SWE -	SWE -	UK -	UK -	AUT -	AUT -	-	0
1968	500cc	ČZ	AUT -	AUT -	ITA -	ITA -	SWE -	SWE -	FIN -	FIN -	GDR -	GDR -	CZE -	CZE -	UK -	UK -	GER -	GER -	FRA -	FRA -	NED -	NED -	BEL; 9	BEL; 5	LUX -	LUX; 9	CH -	CH -			25th	1
1969	250cc	Ossa	ESP -	ESP -	CH; 13	CH; 11	YUG -	YUG -	CZE -	CZE; 10	POL; 10	POL; 11	GER -	GER -	NED -	NED -	FRA -	FRA; 14	UK -	UK -	SWE -	SWE -	FIN -	FIN -	USR -	USR -					37th	2
1969	500cc	ČZ	AUT -	AUT -	SWE -	SWE -	NED -	NED -	ITA -	ITA -	CZE -	CZE -	USR -	USR -	GER -	GER -	BEL; 19	BEL; 9	LUX -	LUX -	FRA -	FRA -	CH -	CH -	GDR -	GDR -					-	0
1970	250cc	ČZ	ESP; 11	ESP; 9	FRA; 10	FRA; 5	BEL; 11	BEL; 12	YUG -	YUG -	ITA -	ITA -	USR -	USR -	POL -	POL -	UK -	UK -	FIN -	FIN -	GDR -	GDR -	CH -	CH -	AUT -	AUT -					16th	7
1970	500cc	ČZ	CH -	CH -	AUT -	AUT -	NED -	NED -	FRA -	FRA -	FIN -	FIN -	SWE -	SWE -	CZE -	CZE -	USR -	USR -	GER -	GER -	GDR -	GDR -	BEL; 5	BEL; 7	LUX -	LUX -					24th	5
1971	250cc	ČZ	ESP; 3	ESP; 6	CH; 11	CH; 9	POL -	POL -	GER; 18	GER; 6	YUG -	YUG -	ITA; 3	ITA; 10	NED; 1	NED; 2	GDR; 1	GDR; 1	FIN; 2	FIN; 2	SWE; 8	SWE; 7	UK -	UK -	AUT -	AUT -					11th	20
1972	250cc	Husqvarna	ESP; 4	ESP; 4	FRA; 10	FRA; 9	NED; 15	NED; 8	CZE -	CZE; 7	YUG; 8	YUG; 6	GER; 6	GER -	POL; 10	POL; 8	USR -	USR -	FIN -	FIN -	SWE -	SWE -	UK -	UK -	CH -	CH -					13th	23
1973	250cc	Suzuki	ESP -	ESP; 10	ITA; 10	ITA; 10	BEL -	BEL; 10	CH; 9	CH; 6	POL -	POL -	YUG -	YUG -	FRA -	FRA -	FIN -	FIN -	USR -	USR -	SWE -	SWE -	AUT -	AUT -							20th	11
1974	250cc	Suzuki	ESP; 10	ESP -	ITA -	ITA; 4	CZE; 8	CZE; 8	POL; 2	POL; 2	YUG; 4	YUG -	UK; 10	UK -	GER; 1	GER; 3	NED; 4	NED -	FIN; 9	FIN -	SWE; 8	SWE; 9	CH; 5	CH; 4							5th	96
1975	125cc	Suzuki	FRA; 1	FRA; 3	UK; 1	UK; 1	YUG; 1	YUG; 1	SWE; 1	SWE; 1	NED; 1	NED; 1	POL; 2	POL; 2	GER; 1	GER; 1	CZE; 1	CZE; 1	USA -	USA -	CAN; 3	CAN; 3	ESP; 2	ESP; 2	BEL; 1	BEL; 2					1st	195
1976	125cc	Suzuki	AUT; 2	AUT; 1	ITA; 1	ITA; 2	UK; 1	UK; 1	BEL; 1	BEL; 1	DEN; 1	DEN -	FIN; 1	FIN; 1	CZE; 2	CZE; 2	FRA; 1	FRA -	USA; 5	USA -	GER; 1	GER; 1	ESP; 1	ESP; 1	CH; 2	CH; 1					1st	195
1977	125cc	Suzuki	FRA; 1	FRA; 2	ITA; 1	ITA; 8	BEL; 1	BEL; 1	DEN; 2	DEN; 2	POL; 1	POL -	YUG; 1	YUG; 1	CZE; 1	CZE; 5	GER; 1	GER; 1	CH; 1	CH; 1	USA; 3	USA; 1	CAN; 2	CAN -	ESP; 1	ESP; 1					1st	292
1978	125cc	Suzuki	AUT; 1	AUT; 1	ITA; 1	ITA; 2	BEL; 2	BEL; 2	DEN; 3	DEN; 4	NED; 3	NED -	FRA; 1	FRA; 1	YUG; 4	YUG; 3	GER; 1	GER; 2	CH -	CH; 2	POL; 2	POL; 2	USA; 6	USA -	ESP; 3	ESP; 6	CZE; 2	CZE; 1			2nd	249
1979	125cc	Yamaha	AUT; 2	AUT -	GER -	GER -	NED; 4	NED -	ITA; 5	ITA -	FIN; 4	FIN; 3	CZE; 3	CZE; 3	YUG; 4	YUG; 3	CH; 4	CH; 1	FRA; 3	FRA; 2	IRL; 3	IRL; 3	USA; 3	USA; 5	ESP; 3	ESP; 3					3rd	183
1980	125cc	Gilera	NED; 4	NED; 6	AUT -	AUT; 2	BEL; 7	BEL -	FRA; 10	FRA -	YUG; 2	YUG; 1	GER -	GER -	ITA -	ITA -	CZE -	CZE -	FIN -	FIN -	USA; 9	USA -	ESP -	ESP; 4							9th	67
1981	125cc	Gilera	ITA; 6	ITA; 4	NED; 4	NED; 5	AUT -	AUT -	GER; 5	GER; 7	FRA -	FRA; 5	YUG; 4	YUG; 8	POL; 6	POL -	CH; 2	CH -	USA -	USA -	FIN; 4	FIN; 8	CZE; 7	CZE; 8	ESP -	ESP; 4					7th	97
1982	250cc	Suzuki	CH -	CH -	ESP -	ESP -	BEL -	BEL -	CZE -	CZE -	ITA; 6	ITA; 9	FRA; 5	FRA; 5	UK -	UK -	NED -	NED -	USR; 9	USR; 7	USA -	USA -	FIN -	FIN -	SWE -	SWE -					15th	25
1983	250cc	Suzuki	ESP -	ESP -	FRA; 6	FRA -	ITA -	ITA -	NED; 6	NED -	BUL -	BUL -	GER; 5	GER; 5	UK -	UK -	CAN -	CAN -	USA -	USA -	CH -	CH -	SWE -	SWE -	FIN -	FIN -					22nd	10

== Paris-Dakar results ==
Year	Machine	Position
1983	BMW R80G/S	Abandoned
1984	BMW R80G/S	1st
1985	BMW R80G/S	1st
1986	BMW R80G/S	14th
1987	BMW R80G/S	3rd
1988	Suzuki DR-Z 600	9th
1989	Suzuki DR-Z 750	11th
1990	Suzuki DR-Z 800	9th
1991	Suzuki DR-Z 750	13th

Sporting positions
Preceded by Hubert Auriol	Dakar Rally; Motorcycle Winner; 1984–1985	Succeeded by Cyril Neveu
