= René Metge =

French rally driver (1941–2024)

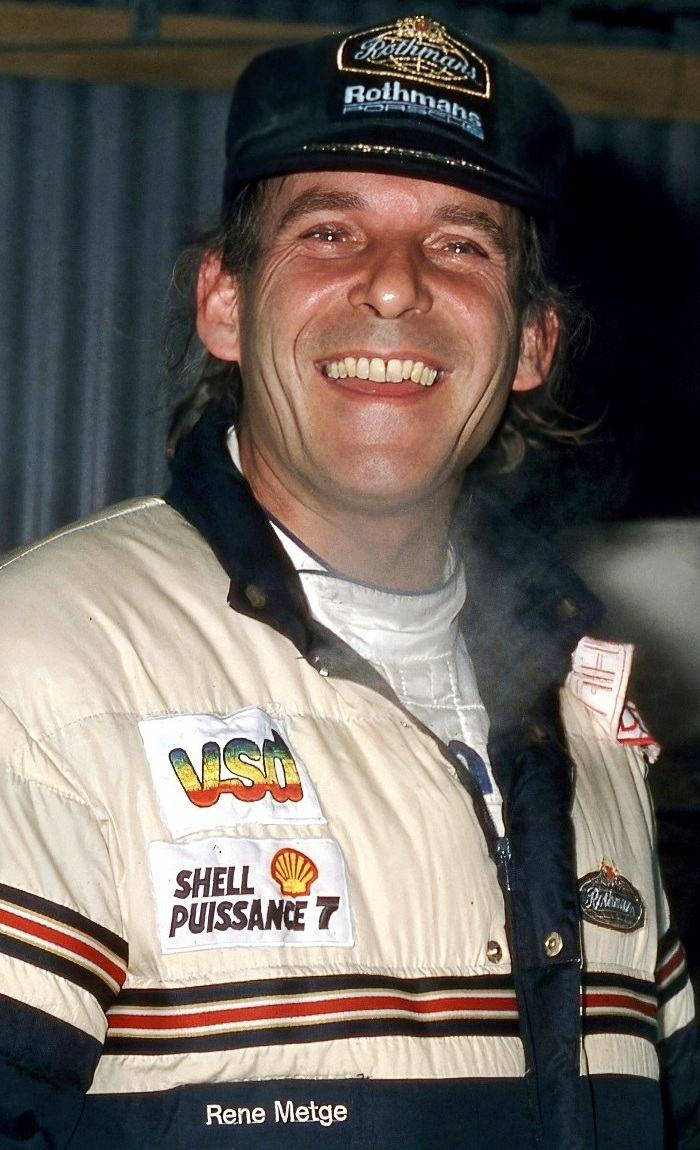
Metge in 1985

René Jean Metge (23 October 1941 – 3 January 2024) was a French professional rally driver. He won the Dakar Rally three times, in 1981, 1984 and 1986.

== Career ==
Metge began his career in international motor racing in 1973, starting in the Formula Renault 2.0 West European Cup. He scored 28 points in the general classification there. In later years, Metge also appeared in the French Supertouring Championship, FIA World Endurance Championship, World Sportscar Championship, World Touring Car Championship, Porsche 944 Turbo Cup France, 24 Hours of Le Mans, 24 Hours of Spa, and European Touring Car Championship.

Metge also competed in the Dakar Rally, which he won three times: in 1981, 1984 and 1986.

== Personal life and death ==
René Metge was born in Montrouge, German-occupied France on 23 October 1941. René Metge was Coluche's brother-in-law: they were friends as a teenager and he married Daniele, the older sister of him, with whom he started his family.. In 2003, René competed in the Dakar Rally with their daughter Élodie Metge. He died on 3 January 2024 in Longjumeau, at the age of 82. He was buried in the communal cemetery in Saint-Urcize. ·.

== Racing record ==
=== Paris-Dakar results ===
Year	Category	Crew	Vehicle	Pos.
1979	Car	(France) Claude Barbier	Range Rover V8	Ret.
1980	Truck	(France) Thierry de Saulieu - (France) Georges Landais	Leyland Marathon	7th
1981	Car	(France) Bernard Giroux	Range Rover V8	1st
1982	Car	(France) Bernard Giroux	Range Rover V8	Ret.
1983	Car	(France) Alain Gillot	Range Rover V8	Ret.
1984	Car	(France) Dominique Lemoyne	Porsche 953	1st
1985	Car	(France) Dominique Lemoyne	Porsche 959	Ret.
1986	Car	(France) Dominique Lemoyne	Porsche 959	1st
1994	Truck	(France) Pascal Serre - (Italy) Livio Diamante	Perlini	6th
1996	Car	co-driver of (France) Patrick Tambay	Mitsubishi Pajero	13th
2002	Car	co-driver of (France) Johnny Hallyday	Nissan	49th
2003	Car	(France) Élodie Metge	Mercedes ML 430	23rd
2006	Car	(France) Bernard Chevalier	Nissan	31st
2007	Car	co-driver of (France) Yvan Muller	Buggy Dessoude	22nd

=== 24 Hours of Le Mans results ===
Year	Team	Car	Co-Drivers	Pos.	Reason
1977	(France) Anne-Charlotte Verney BP	Porsche 911 Carrera RSR	(France) Anne-Charlotte Verney (France) Dany Snobeck (France) Hubert Striebig	18th 2nd in Group 5	
1979	(France) Anne-Charlotte Verney	Porsche 934	(France) Anne-Charlotte Verney (France) Patrick Bardinon	19th	
1982	(United States) Cooke Racing - BP	Porsche 935 K3	(France) François Sérvanin (France) Dany Snobeck	5th	
1984	(United Kingdom) GTi Engineering	Porsche 956	(United Kingdom) Richard Lloyd (United Kingdom) Nick Mason	DSQ	unauthorized outside help
1986	(Germany) Porsche AG	Porsche 961	(France) Claude Ballot-Léna	7th Class Winner in IMSA GTX	
1987	(Germany) Porsche AG	Porsche 961	(Switzerland) Claude Haldi (Canada) Kees Nierop	DNF	Accident

=== World Sportscar Championship results ===
Season	Team	Racecar	1	2	3	4	5	6	7	8	9	10	11	12	13	14	15	16	17
1979	Anne-Charlotte Verney Elvia	Porsche 934 Triumph Dolomite	United States	United States	Italy	United States	France	United States	United Kingdom	Germany	France	Italy	United States	United States	Belgium	United Kingdom	United States	Italy	El Salvador
1979	Anne-Charlotte Verney Elvia	Porsche 934 Triumph Dolomite									19				DNF				
1981	J.M.S.R.T.	BMW 530	United States	United States	Italy	Italy	United States	United Kingdom	Germany	France	Italy	United States	United States	Belgium	Canada	United States	United Kingdom		
1981	J.M.S.R.T.	BMW 530												DNF					
1982	Cooke Racing	Porsche 935	Italy	United Kingdom	Germany	France	Belgium	Italy	Japan	United Kingdom									
1982	Cooke Racing	Porsche 935				5													
1984	GTi Engineering	Porsche 956	Italy	United Kingdom	France	Germany	United Kingdom	Canada	Belgium	Italy	Japan	South Africa	Australia						
1984	GTi Engineering	Porsche 956			DNF														
1986	Porsche	Porsche 961	Italy	United Kingdom	France	Germany	United Kingdom	Spain	Germany	Belgium	Japan								
1986	Porsche	Porsche 961			7														
1987	Porsche	Porsche 961	Spain	Spain	Italy	United Kingdom	France	Germany	United Kingdom	Germany	Belgium	Japan							
1987	Porsche	Porsche 961					DNF												

== Bibliography ==
- Gilles David & René Metge (28 February 2022). René Metge: Pilote de 7 à 77 ans (in French). Le Voyageur Éditions. ISBN 978-2-36214-048-8.

Sporting positions
Preceded by Inaugural	Porsche Carrera Cup France champion 1987	Succeeded by André Bourdon
