= Peter Schutz =

American automobile business executive

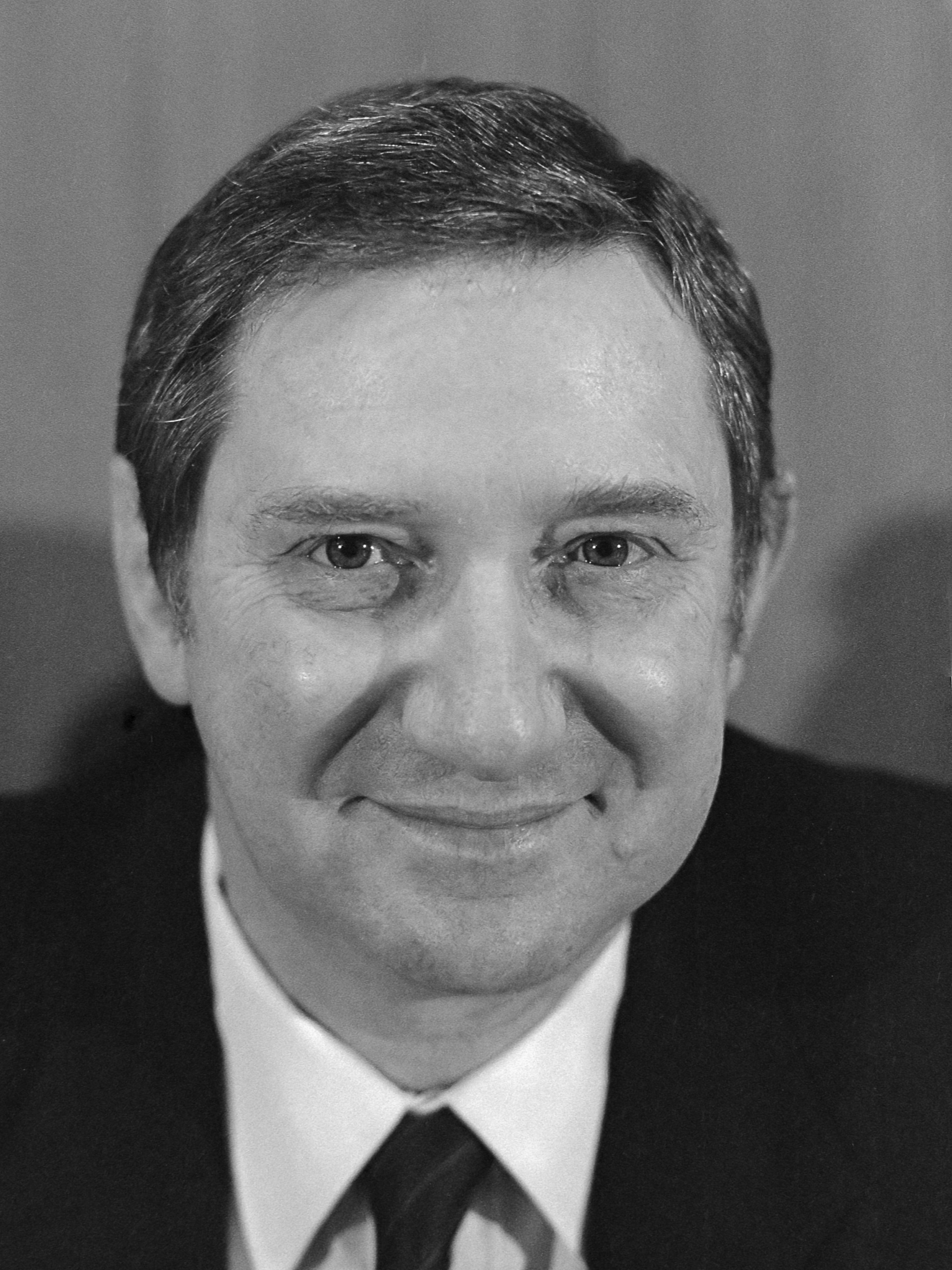
Peter Werner Schutz (1983)

Peter Werner Schutz (April 20, 1930 – October 29, 2017) was the president and CEO of Porsche between 1981 and 1987, a time in which the company greatly expanded sales, primarily in the United States. He was a motivational speaker and co-founder of Harris and Schutz Inc., with his wife Sheila Harris-Schutz.

== Early life and career ==
Peter Schutz was born to Jewish parents in Berlin, Germany. The rise of the Nazi party led to the family fleeing to Havana, Cuba in 1937. In March 1939 they emigrated to Chicago, Illinois. Schutz grew up in Chicago, and received a BS degree in Mechanical Engineering from the Illinois Institute of Technology.

After graduation, Schutz worked as an engineer at Caterpillar Tractor in Peoria, Illinois for 15 years. He left Caterpillar for Cummins Engine, where he served 11 years, initially in corporate strategic planning, and then 8 years as vice president responsible for sales and service of truck engines in the U.S. and Canada. During this time he worked with freight hauling companies to improve their profitability, instituting driver performance measures. Profits surged, and the Teamsters invited Schutz to speak at their 1976 convention. When Cummins management questioned his decision to accept the appearance, he left the company. In 1978 he took over the Deutz Engine Division of Klöckner-Humboldt-Deutz.

== Porsche years ==
In 1980 Porsche suffered its first money-losing year in history, much of the problem due to falling sales in the U.S. and lackluster takeup of their new designs, the 924 and 928. Porsche removed long-time CEO Ernst Fuhrmann and started looking for a replacement. Ferry Porsche personally invited Schutz to apply as one of 12 potential candidates for the position. Porsche told Schutz that the company was simply not working as a unit, and needed someone to bring the various divisions together. Although it was never specifically stated, it was widely believed that Schutz was selected in order to have an American running the company to re-ignite sales in the U.S.

Schutz responded to the challenges rapidly. Dealers complained that the prices were too high and the cars had constant quality control problems; Schutz decided the former was only a problem due to the latter. Asking the automobile division, he found that a simple problem with the drive chain for the camshafts was the cause for many of these complaints. When he asked why the problem had not been fixed, he was told that there was no reason to do so; the 911 was ending production in favor of the 924 and 928.

Cancellation of the 911 was also causing low morale in the engineering department, where the 911 was seen as the quintessential Porsche. While sitting in the office of Helmuth Bott, chief of engineering, he noticed a chart that showed the evolution of the 924, 928 and 911 on the wall. The line for the 911 stopped at the end of 1981. Schutz picked up a marker, extended the 911's line off the end of the chart onto the wall, and told Bott to make it happen. In the meantime he had the camshaft and other minor fixes implemented, quickly ending the quality control issues.

Meanwhile, the Porsche racing team was in the process of entering 24 Hours of Le Mans with modified 924s, which they stated had no hope of winning. Schutz said that they were either going to the race with the intention of winning, or not going at all. The engineers responded by pulling three 936s from museum displays, equipping them with experimental engines developed for Indy Car racing, and winning the race. This was followed by the 956 that dominated Le Mans in 1982 and 1000 km Nürburgring in 1983, and the all-wheel-drive 953, which won the Paris-Dakar Rally in 1984, and the 959 in 1986.

Under Schutz's new orders, Bott started the process of dramatically improving the 911. The result was the 3.2 litre third-generation Carrera series of 1984. He also used the new 911 engine as the basis for an aircraft engine, the ill-fated Porsche PFM 3200. Racing success, improved models and, most importantly, a strong U.S. economy and exchange rate all fed into ever-increasing sales through the mid-1980s. During the Schutz tenure, Porsche worldwide sales grew from 28,000 units in 1980-81 to a peak of 53,000 units in 1986.

When the U.S. economy suffered a major downturn in 1987, coupled with a dramatic drop in the US-German exchange rate, U.S. street prices of the Porsche lineup increased dramatically. Production for all models dropped to 48,520 cars and U.S. sales, which earlier made up over 60% of Porsche sales, dropped to under half of output. In December, Porsche announced that Schutz was being replaced by Heinz Branitzki, who was later replaced by Arno Bohn and, consequently, by Wendelin Wiedeking.
