= Show or Display =

Statutory amendment to the FMVSS

The "Show or Display" rule is a statutory amendment to the United States Federal Motor Vehicle Safety Standards (FMVSS) that allows certain privately imported automobiles to be exempted, if the vehicle in question is deemed to meet a standard of "historical or technological significance".

The amendment, which became law on August 13, 1999, is intended to apply to vehicles that could not feasibly be brought into compliance with the FMVSS, including requirements for destructive testing – and that do not have a similar make or model certified for sale in the United States market. Applications are managed by the National Highway Traffic Safety Administration, and may allow limited use on public roads (2,500 miles (4,000 km) annually).

The permitted vehicle list is mostly restricted to expensive sports and touring automobiles due to the cost and effort needed to import a vehicle with this exemption.

== Background ==
The United States is not signatory to the United Nations World Forum for Harmonization of Vehicle Regulations. Until 1967, Americans were still allowed to purchase cars from overseas with no restrictions. From 1968 to 1988, Americans were permitted to purchase recent vehicles abroad and modify them to meet NHTSA and EPA design regulations, in what was known as the grey market. In 1988, Americans were largely forbidden from owning individually imported vehicles.

== Detail of Law ==
The approval for "Show or Display" import is granted if the prospective importer is able to show historical or technological significance of the vehicle in question, and if the vehicle was produced in limited numbers (with 500 being used as a threshold value.) Import approval is granted on a combination of make, model, and production-year; thus, there is no need to re-apply for approved vehicles when further examples are imported in the future.

NHTSA originally proposed an annual mileage limitation of 500 on-road miles, and also required that a certified mileage statement be submitted annually during the first five years after import. During a comment period on the wording of the statute in May 1999, the Special Vehicles Coalition recommended that the figure be increased to 2,500 miles (a figure already in use by the insurance industry as a threshold to describe a limited-use vehicle.) The Coalition also recommended the elimination of the annual mileage statement requirement, as such a statement would not accurately reflect on-road mileage for vehicles that are also used off public roads. Both recommendations were incorporated into the final wording of the statute, though NHTSA retains the right to inspect an imported vehicle for the purpose of verifying mileage.

Citing unspecified concerns about public safety, NHTSA reserves the right to approve a vehicle for "Show or Display" import, but disallow it from being registered for use on public roads. The administration also reserves the right, at the time of import, to place any other arbitrary restrictions or limitations on the use of an imported vehicle. Regardless of "Show or Display" approval, imported vehicles must also meet the import restrictions defined by the Environmental Protection Agency (EPA).

NHTSA does not require FMVSS compliance for any imported vehicles that are above a certain age, currently 25 years.

== Notable examples ==
Microsoft founder Bill Gates bought a Porsche 959 in 1988, which did not have Department of Transportation or Environmental Protection Agency approval. The car was stored by the Customs Service at the Port of San Francisco for 13 years, until the Show or Display rule came into force and the agency could released the car into his custody.

== Vehicles eligible ==
As of November 2022, these are the only cars that have been approved for import under the Show or Display exception. Some of these models have since passed the 25 year mark, meaning that both they and even the less-limited versions of the same car (i.e., the non-Nismo Nissan Skyline R32) are exempt from import restrictions anyway.

Make	Model	Model Year
Aston Martin	DB7 Zagato Coupe	2003
Aston Martin	Lagonda Taraf	2016
Aston Martin	One-77	2011
Aston Martin	V12 Zagato	2012–2013
Aston Martin	Valkyrie	2023-present
Aston Martin	Vanquish Zagato	2004
Aston Martin	Vantage LeMans	1999–2000
Audi	Sport Quattro	1984
Australian Ford	Falcon XC Bathurst Cobra	1978
Bentley	Mulliner Bacalar	2022
BMW	Hossack K100RS Prototype M/C	1984
BMW	M3 CRT	2012
BMW	M3 Sport Evolution (UK Version)	1990
BMW	Z1	1988–1991
Bugatti	Centodieci	2022
Bugatti	Divo	2020-2022
Bugatti	EB110	1992–1995
Cizeta-Moroder	V16T	1994
Ferrari	Enzo #400 (Pope John Paul II)	2005
Ferrari	J50	2018
Ferrari	Monza SP1 & SP2	2019-2022
Ferrari	SP30	2013
Ford	RS200 Evolution	1985–1986
Ford	Sierra Cosworth RS 500	1986
Gordon Murray Automotive (GMA)	T.50	2022
Gruter & Gut (GG)	Duetto Sidecar M/C	1997
Holden	VTII GTS-R	2000
Honda	NR750	1992
Italdesign	Aztec	1988
Jaguar	XJ220	1992–1994
Koenigsegg	One:1	2015
Lamborghini	Diablo GT	1999
Land Rover	Range Rover Vogue 25th Anniversary Final Edition	1995
Land Rover	Defender Celebration Autobiography	2016
Land Rover	Defender Celebration Heritage	2016
Lotus	Evija	2021-present
Lotus	Evora GTE F1 Limited Edition	2011
Lotus	Exige Cup 430 Final Edition	2021
Lotus	Omega (LHD)	1990–1992
Maserati	Ghibli Open Cup	1996–1997
Maserati	MC12	2004–2005
Maserati	Shamal	1991
Mazda	Eunos JCES Cosmo Series II	1994–1995
McLaren	F1	1993–1998
McLaren	Speedtail	2020–Present
Mercedes-Benz	190E 2.5-16 Evolution II	1990
Mercedes-Benz	560 SEL ex-Gorbachev Armored	1991
Mercedes-Benz	AMG CLK-DTM Coupe	2005
Mercedes-Benz	CLK DTM AMG Cabriolet	2006
Mercedes-Benz	CLK-GTR Coupe	1998–1999
Mercedes-Benz	CLK-GTR Roadster	2002
Mercedes-Benz	G-500 Cabriolet Final Edition 200	2011, 2013
Mercedes-Benz	Mercedes-Benz G63 AMG 6x6	2013
Mercedes-Benz	Maybach G650 Landaulet	2013
Mercedes-Benz	McLaren SLR 722S	2009
Mercedes-Benz	SLR McLaren Stirling Moss	2009
MG TF	80th Anniversary Limited Edition (RHD/UK)	2004
Morgan	Aeromax	2010
Morgan	Morgan Plus 8 GTR	2021
Morgan	Plus 8 Speedster/Roadster 50th Anniversary Edition	2018
Nissan	Nismo R32 Skyline GT-R (VINs BNR32-100000 through BNR32-100562)	1990
Nissan	R34 Skyline GT-R M-Spec Nür	2002
Nissan	Skyline GTR R34 V-SPEC Early Model Limited Edition	1999
Oullim	Spirra S	2011
Pagani	Zonda	1999-2018
Peugeot	205 Turbo 16	1984–1985
Porsche	911 Carrera 4S (Last Made)	1998
Porsche	911 GT3 RS	2004
Porsche	911 Sport Classic	2010
Porsche	911 Turbo S	1998
Porsche	911 Turbo XLC Option Package	1998
Porsche	959	1987-1988
Porsche	964 Turbo Flat-Nose X83	1994
Porsche	964 Turbo S Leichtbau	1993
Porsche	968 Turbo S	1993
Porsche	993 Carrera RS GT2	1995–1996
Porsche	GT1	1998
Porsche	GT1 Straßenversion	1997
Rimac Automobili	Concept One	2016
RMA	Amphi-Ranger 2800 SR	1985–1995
Rover	Mini Cooper S (Last 50 made)	2000
Spyker	B6 Venator	2012
Subaru	Impreza 22B STi	1998
Subaru	Version-L Alcyone SVX 4WS	1992
Toyota	RAV4-EV (SWB Prototype)	1997
