= Porsche 953 =

1984 car variant built for the Dakar Rally

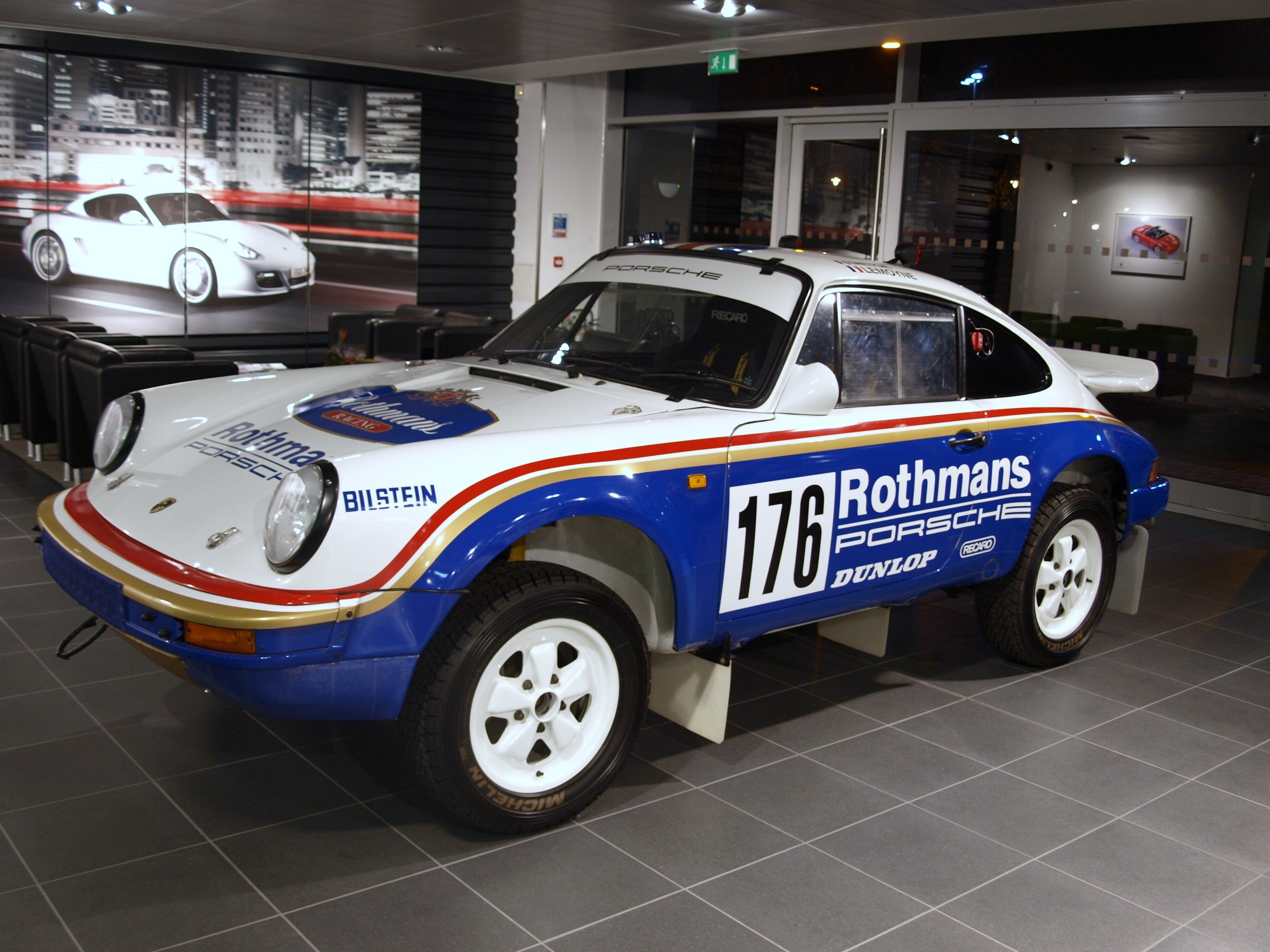
The 1984 Paris-Dakar winning Porsche 953 driven by René Metge and Dominique Lemoyne.

The Porsche 953 was a heavily modified variant of the 911, designed and built specifically to compete in the 1984 Paris–Dakar Rally. It was a short lived model, as it was replaced in 1985 by the 959. It is sometimes referred to as the 911 4x4, as it used the developmental, manually controlled four-wheel drive system that was intended to be used on the 959. Travelling on an extremely enhanced suspension, powered by a 300 bhp (224 kW), 6-cylinder engine, and weighing in at 2,750 lb (1,247 kg), it was extremely successful. Three of them were entered into the Paris-Dakar Rally, one taking overall first place.
