= 1987 Paris–Dakar Rally =

Off-road motorsport event in Europe and Africa

1987 Dakar Rally

Seasons
- ← 1986 1988 →

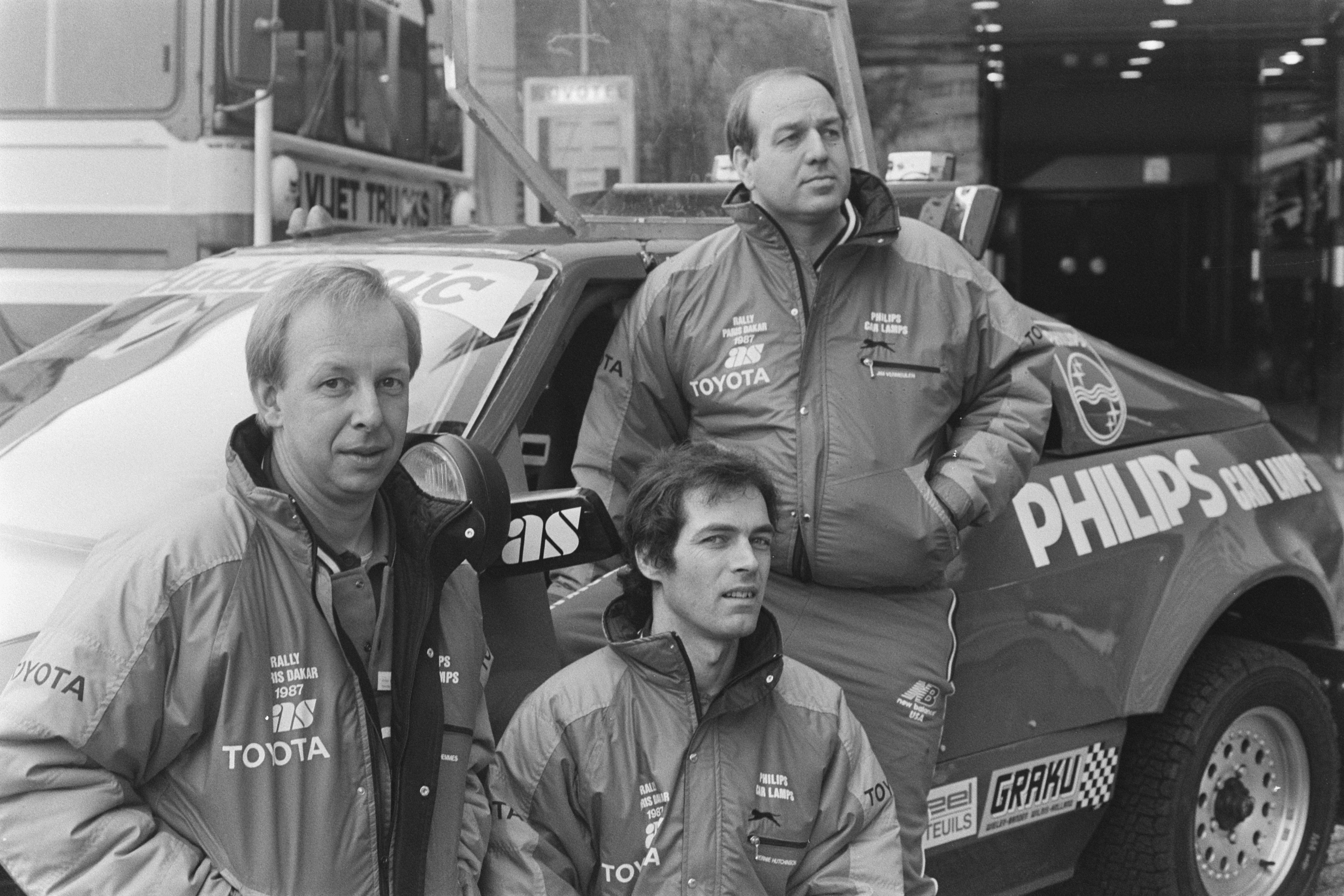
"Toyota Team Holland" at the 1987 Paris-Dakar Rally

1987 Dakar Rally also known as the 1987 Paris–Dakar Rally was the 9th running of the Dakar Rally event. The rally was won by 1981 world rally champion, Ari Vatanen. Cyril Neveu won his fifth motorcycle title after Hubert Auriol broke both ankles in a fall and retired. Jan de Rooy won the truck title, 11th place overall.
