= 1985 Paris–Dakar Rally =

Off-road motorsport event in France and Africa

← Previous event	Next event →
- Host country: France; Algeria; Niger; Mali; Mauritania; Senegal

1985 Dakar Rally also known as the 1985 Paris–Dakar Rally was the seventh running of the Dakar Rally event. The race began at Versailles. Patrick Zaniroli and Jean Da Silva won the car class for the Mitsubishi team. Gaston Rahier won his second successive motorcycle class.

== Final standings ==
=== Bikes ===
	Driver	Vehicle
1.	(Belgium) Gaston Rahier	BMW
2.	(France) Jean Claude Olivier	Yamaha
3.	(Italy) Franco Picco	Yamaha

=== Cars ===
	Driver	Vehicle
1.	(France) Patrick Zaniroli	Mitsubishi Pajero
2.	(United Kingdom) Andrew Cowan	Mitsubishi Pajero
3.	(France) Pierre Fougerouse	Toyota FJ 60
