= 1986 Paris–Dakar Rally =

Off-road motorsport event in France and Africa

← Previous event	Next event →
- Host country: France; Algeria; Niger; Mali; Mauritania; Guinea; Senegal

1986 Dakar Rally also known as the 1986 Paris–Dakar Rally was the 8th running of the Dakar Rally event. René Metge and Dominique Lemoyne won the car class for the second time, using a Porsche 959; Cyril Neveu won the motorcycle class on a Honda NXR750V, while Giacomo Vismara and Giulio Minelli used a Mercedes-Benz to win the truck class.

The event was overshadowed by the death of the event organiser, Thierry Sabine, and four others, including French singer Daniel Balavoine and helicopter pilot François-Xavier Bagnoud in a helicopter crash.

== Final standings ==
=== Cars ===
Rank	Driver	Country	Vehicle
1	René Metge / Dominique Lemoine	France	Porsche 959
2	Jacky Ickx / Claude Brasseur	Belgium	Porsche 959
3	Pascal Rigal / Maingret	France	Mitsubishi Pajero

=== Bikes ===
Rank	Driver	Country	Vehicle
1	Cyril Neveu	France	Honda
2	Gilles Lalay	France	Honda
3	Andrea Balistrieri	Italy	Honda
