= 1983 Paris–Dakar Rally =

Off-road motorsport event in France and Africa

← Previous event	Next event →
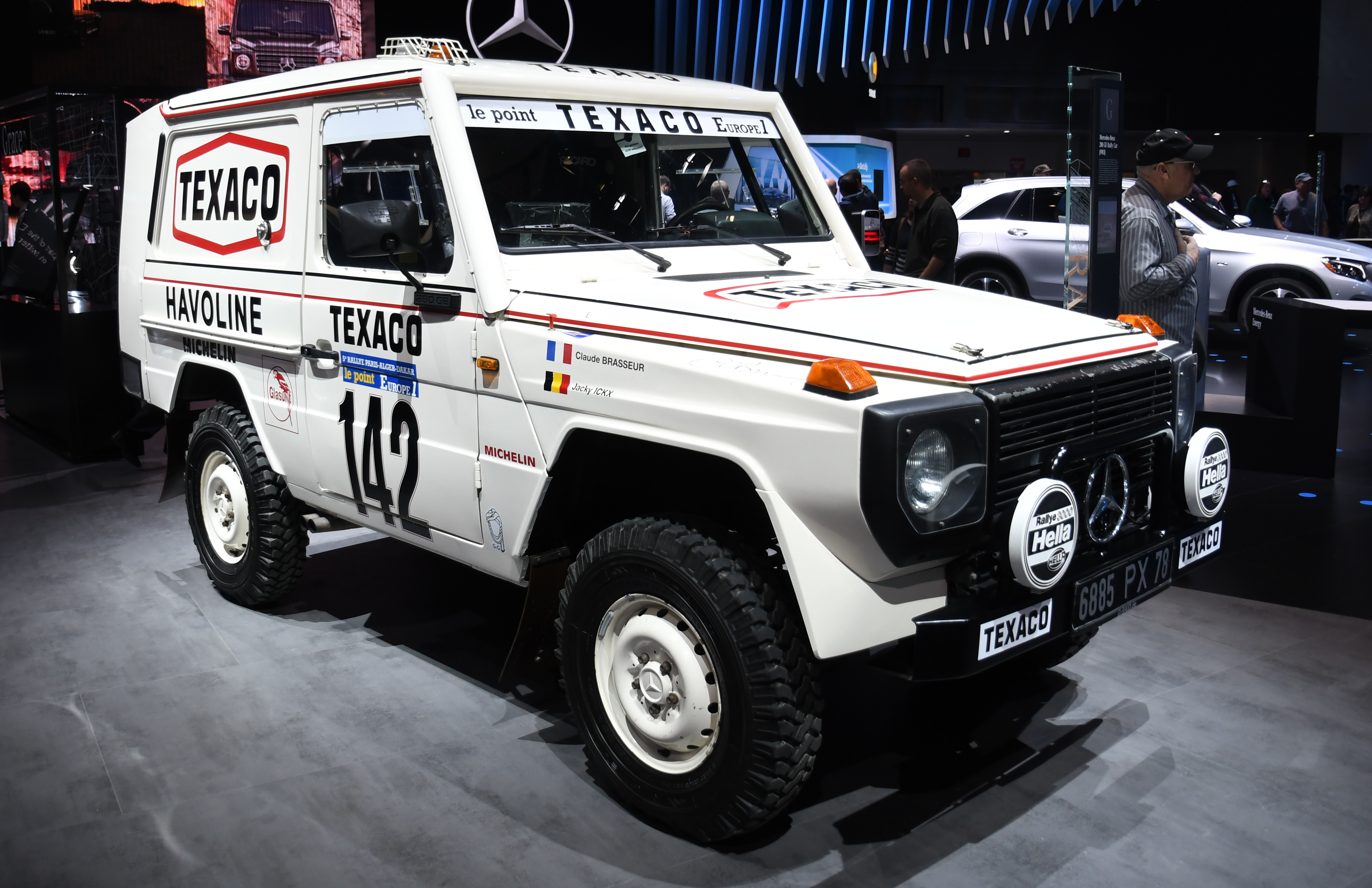
- the successful Mercedes-Benz 280 GE
- Host country: France; Algeria; Niger; Mali; Mauritania; Senegal

1983 Dakar Rally also known as the 1983 Paris–Dakar Rally was the 5th running of the Dakar Rally event. The course crossed the Ténéré desert for the first time. A sandstorm led to 40 competitors becoming lost.

Mercedes won the car category with a 280 G, and the truck category with a 1936 AK, making them the only manufacturer in the history of the event to have won the race overall in two different categories.

== Final standings ==
=== Cars ===
Rank	Driver	Co-driver	Country	Car
1	Jacky Ickx	Claude Brasseur	France	Mercedes
2	André Trossat	Eric Briavoine	France	Lada
3	Pierre Lartigue	P. Destaillats	France	Rover

=== Bikes ===
Rank	Driver	Country	Bike
1	Hubert Auriol	France	BMW
2	Patrick Dobrecq	France	Honda
3	Marc Joineau	France	Suzuki
