= 1984 Paris–Dakar Rally =

Off-road motorsport event in France and Africa

← Previous event	Next event →
- Host country: France; Ivory Coast; Guinea; Sierra Leone; Mauritania; Senegal

Results
- Cars winner: (France) René Metge; Porsche 911
- Bikes winner: (Belgium) Gaston Rahier; BMW
- Trucks winner: (France) Pierre Lalleu; Mercedes

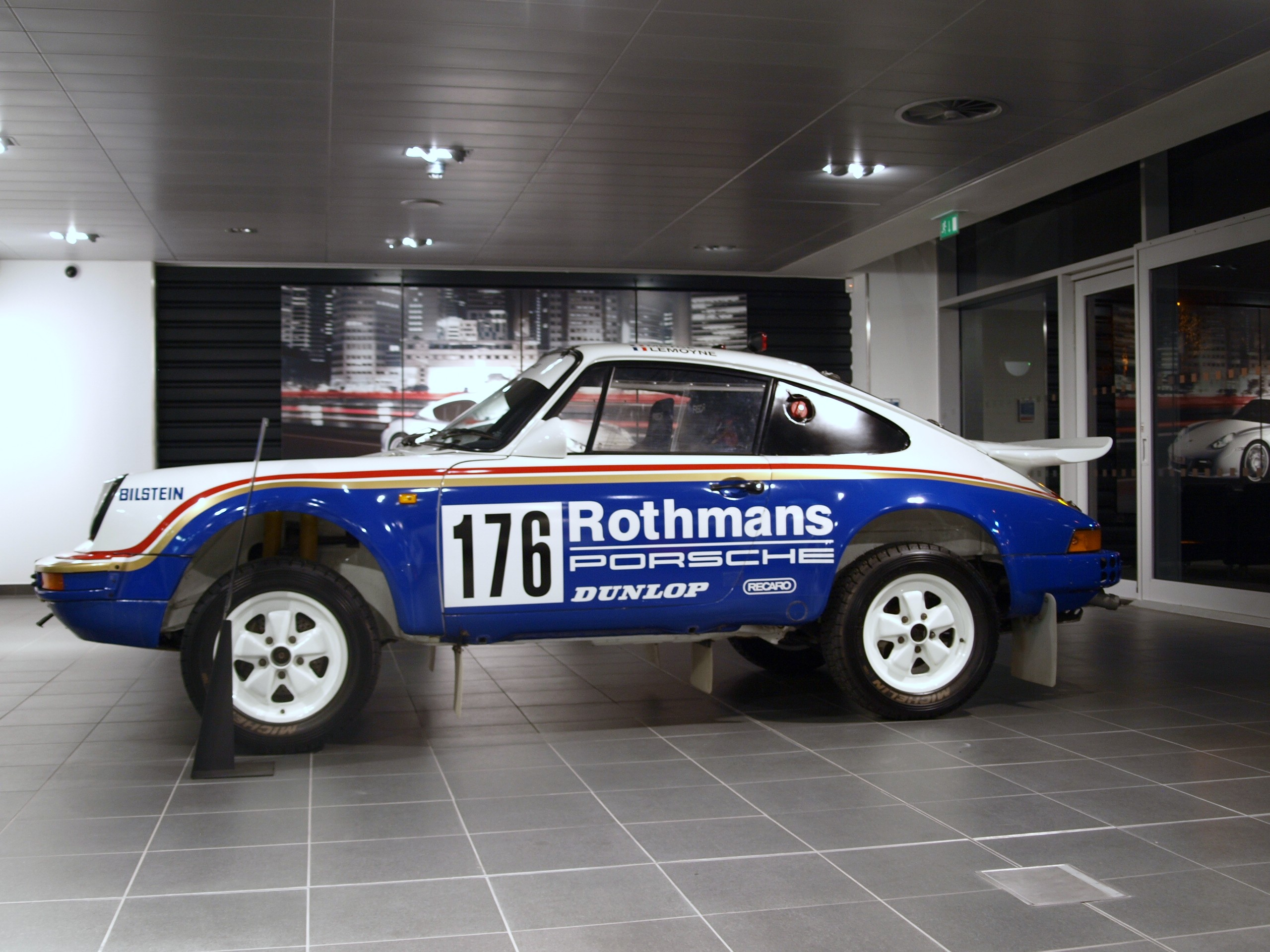
The 1984 Paris-Dakar winning Porsche 953 driven by René Metge and Dominique Lemoyne.

1984 Dakar Rally also known as the 1984 Paris–Dakar Rally was the 6th running of the Dakar Rally event. The course was extended through Ivory Coast, Guinea, Sierra Leone and Mauritania. 427 competitors started. René Metge and Dominique Lemoyne won the car class with a Porsche 953, which was often called the 911 SC/RS 4x4, and Gaston Rahier won the motorcycles class.

== Final standings ==
=== Bikes ===
	Rider	Bike
1.	(Belgium) Gaston Rahier	BMW
2.	(France) Hubert Auriol	BMW
3.	(France) Philippe Vassard	Honda

=== Cars ===
	Driver	Car
1.	(France) René Metge	Porsche 911
2.	(France) Patrick Zaniroli	Range Rover V8
3.	(United Kingdom) Andrew Cowan	Mitsubishi Pajero Evolution
