= Dakar Rally =

Off-road rally raid

- Category: Rally raid
- Region: Europe and Africa (1979–2007, 2027–present); South America (2009–2019); Saudi Arabia & Middle East (2020–2026)
- Inaugural season: 1979
- Drivers' champion: (Qatar) Nasser Al-Attiyah (Cars) (Argentina) Luciano Benavides (Bikes) (Lithuania) Vaidotas Žala (Trucks) (Spain) Pau Navarro (Challenger (T3)) (United States) Brock Heger (SSV (T4)) (Lithuania) Karolis Raišys (Classics) (Spain) Jordi Juvanteny (Mission 1000)
- Official website: dakar.com

The Paris – Dakar route for the 1981 edition

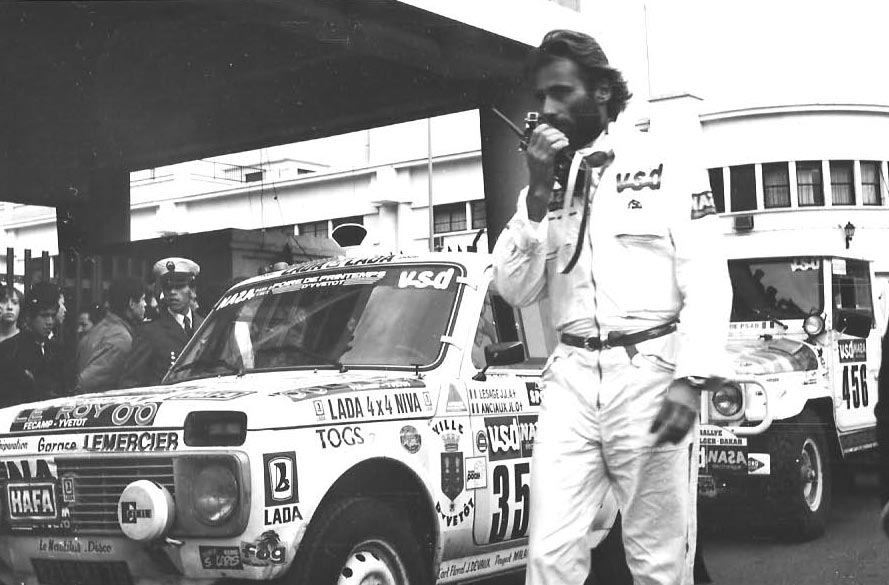
Thierry Sabine, founder of the Dakar Rally, pictured in 1986

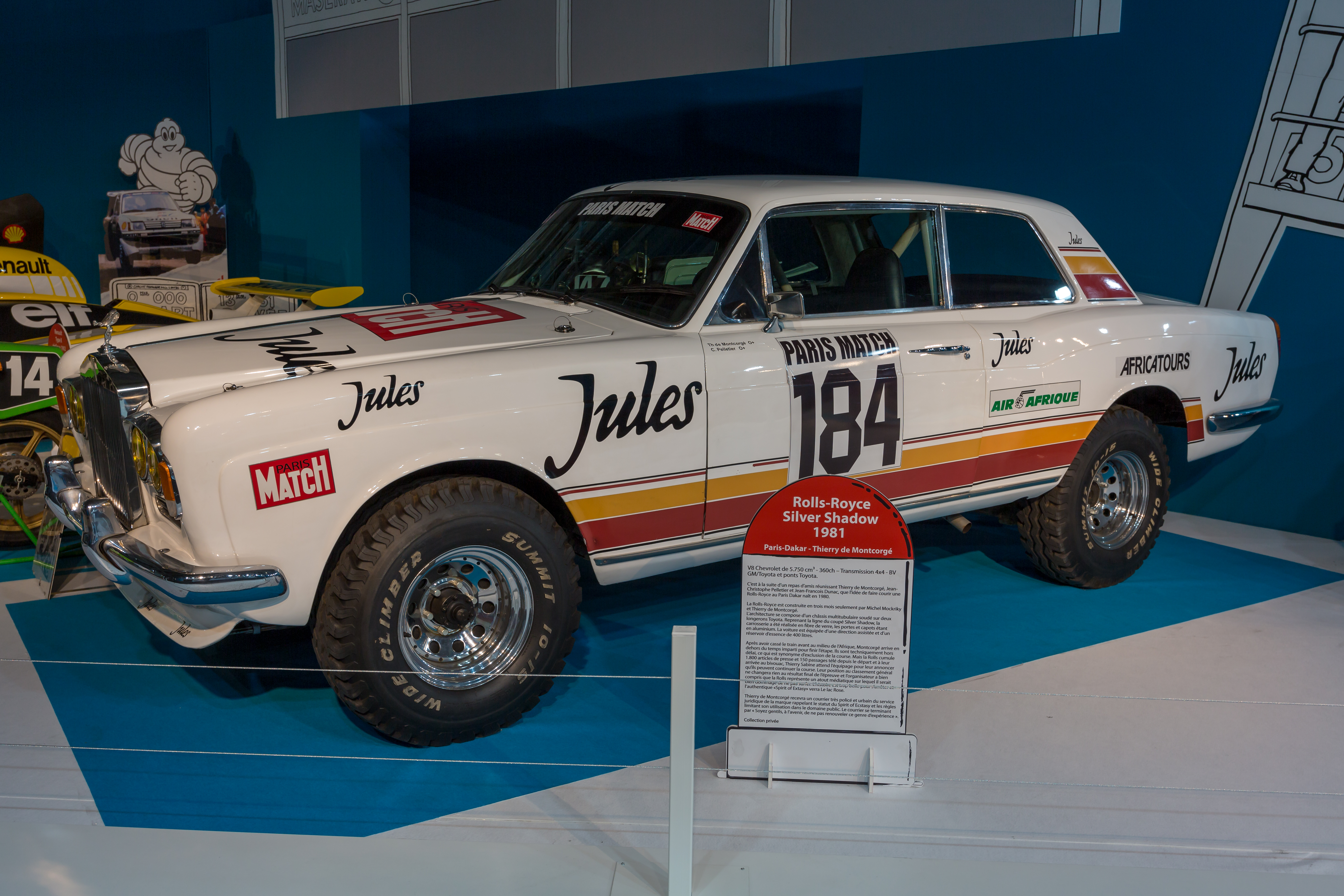
1981 Dakar competitor Rolls-Royce Corniche.

Countries the rally has been through from 1979 to 2007. Orange countries were only travelled through in the 1992 race to Cape Town; that year, participants used maritime transport to get from the Republic of the Congo to Angola, bypassing Zaire.

Countries through which the Dakar Rally has been from 2009 to 2018 since it was moved from the previous Paris-Dakar route due to security concerns. Cities included are major start/end points.

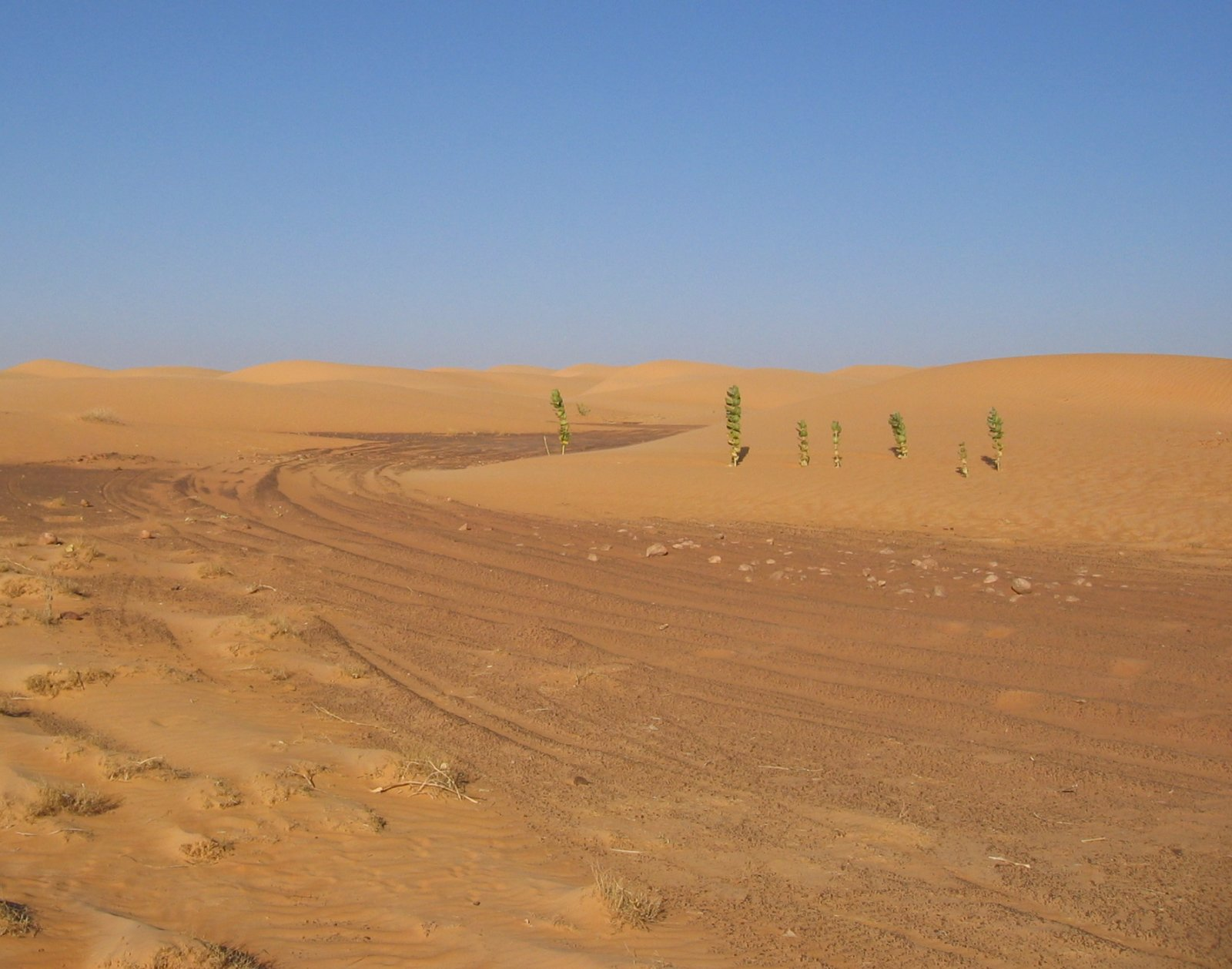
Tracks through the Sahara desert in Mauritania

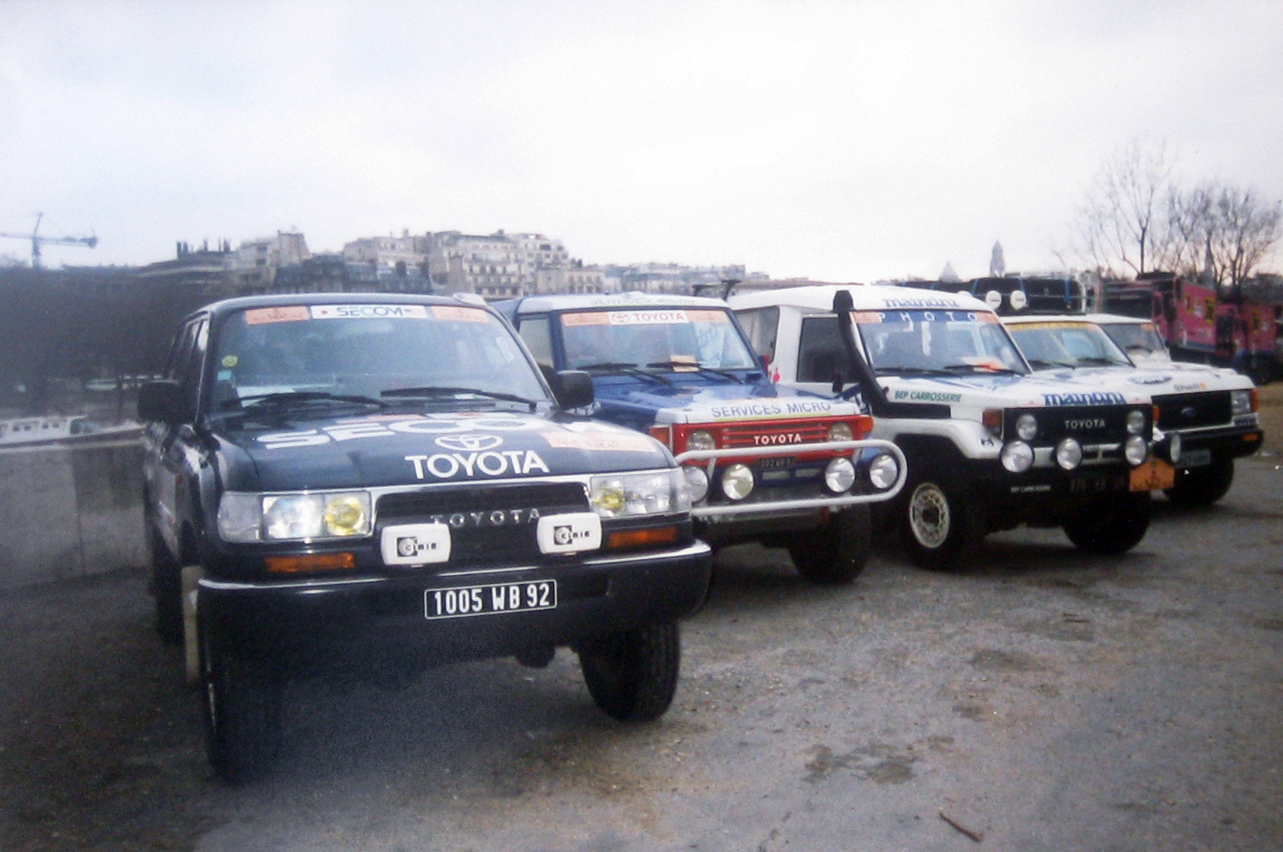
Cars on display in 1992 in Paris

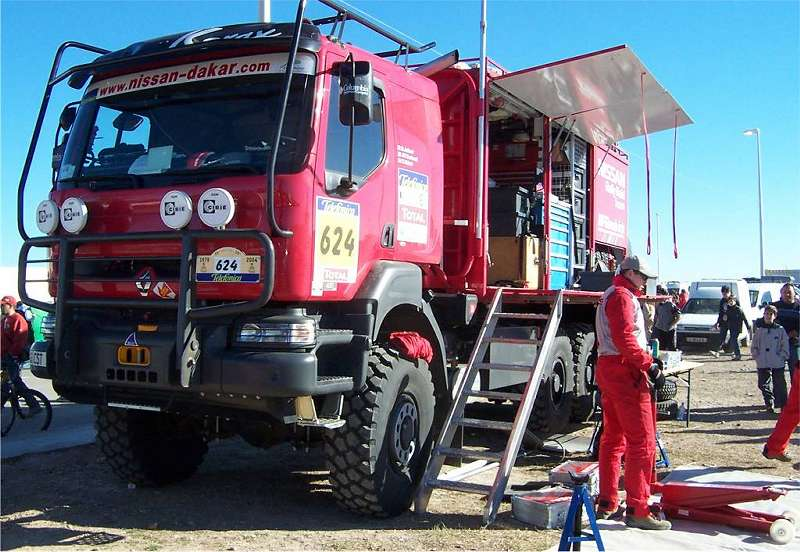
A support truck during the 2004 Dakar

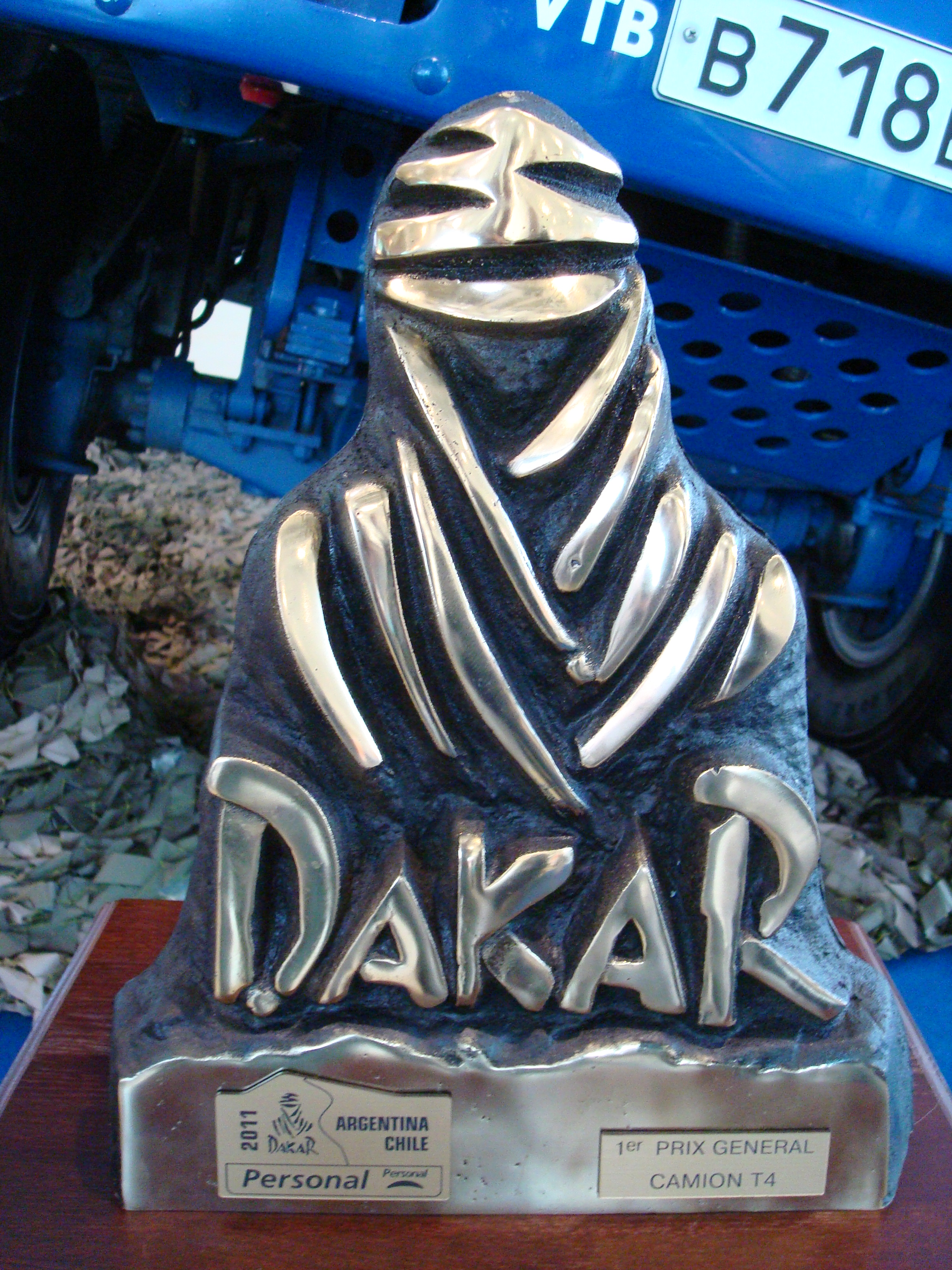
2011 Dakar Rally personal main prize (trucks T4)

The Dakar Rally (French: Le Rallye Dakar) or simply "The Dakar" (Le Dakar), formerly known as the Paris–Dakar Rally (Le Rallye Paris-Dakar), is an annual rally organised by the Amaury Sport Organisation (ASO). It is a rally raid, an off-road endurance race, traversing terrains notably more demanding than prepared roads used in traditional stage rally competitions, and the vehicles used are purposefully built to perform off-road: cars, trucks, quads and motorcycles intentionally designed to endure cross‑country journeys on unpaved terrain. Most timed competitive segments, known as 'special stages', consist of crossing dunes, mud, camel grass, rocks, and erg. Individual stages range in length from several dozen kilometres to as much as 800–900 kilometres (500–560 mi) per day. Hallmarks of the Dakar Rally are the physical and cognitive demands of prolonged driving, navigation and environmental stressors that the competitors are subjected to. Insufficient experience with desert navigation, mechanical troubleshooting or endurance racing techniques, combined with the fatigue and the rough terrain, often result in accidents and serious injuries.

The event began in 1978 as a rally from Paris, France, to Dakar, Senegal. Between 1992 and 2007 some editions did not start in Paris or did not arrive in Dakar, but the rally kept its name. Security threats in Mauritania led to the cancellation of the 2008 rally, and from 2009 to 2019 the rally was held in South America. Since 2020, the rally has been held in Saudi Arabia. The rally is open to amateurs and professionals, with professionals typically making up about eighty percent of participants. Since 2022, it is part of the World Rally-Raid Championship (W2RC) calendar.

== History ==
=== Predecessors ===
The Mediterranean Rally (also known as Algiers-Cape Town Rally) was a trans-Africa rally run in 5 editions between 1951 and 1961. It evolved from the original mixed road and off-road rally to a fully off-road endurance event, during the pioneer years of trans-Africa rallies.

=== Crossing the Sahara ===
The race originated in December 1977, a year after Thierry Sabine got lost in the Ténéré desert whilst competing in the 1975 "Rallye Côte-Côte" between Abidjan and Nice and decided that the desert would be a good location for a regular rally, on the lines of the 1974 London–Sahara–Munich World Cup Rally, the first automobile race to cross the Sahara Desert twice.

In 1971, ex-Cream drummer Ginger Baker used the unproven Range Rover to drive from Algeria to Lagos, Nigeria to set up a recording studio and jam with Fela Kuti. Predating the Paris-Dakar Rally the subsequent documentary is replete with such terrain, and documents the vehicle's endurance.

=== Early growth ===
182 vehicles took the start of the inaugural rally in Paris, with 74 surviving the 10,000-kilometre (6,200 mi) trip to the Senegalese capital of Dakar. Cyril Neveu was the event's first winner, riding a Yamaha motorcycle. The event rapidly grew in popularity, with 216 vehicles taking the start in 1980 and 291 in 1981. The privateer spirit of early racers tackling the event with limited resources encouraged such entrants as Thierry de Montcorgé in a Rolls-Royce and Formula 1 driver Jacky Ickx with actor Claude Brasseur in a Citroën CX, in the 1981 race won by two-time winner Hubert Auriol.

In 1982, there were 382 racers, more than double the number that took the start in 1979. Neveu won the event for a third time, this time riding a Honda motorcycle, while victory in the car class went to the Marreau brothers, driving a privately entered Renault 20. Auriol captured his second bikes class victory in 1983, the first year that Japanese manufacturer Mitsubishi competed in the rally, beginning an association that would last until 2009.

At the behest of 1983 car class winner Jacky Ickx, Porsche entered the Dakar in 1984, with the total number of entries now at 427. The German marque won the event at their first attempt courtesy of René Metge, who had previously won in the car category in 1981, whilst Ickx finished sixth. Gaston Rahier meanwhile continued BMW's success in the motorcycle category with back-to-back wins in 1984 and 1985, the year of Mitsubishi's first victory of 12 in the car category, Patrick Zaniroli taking the spoils. The 1986 event, won by Metge and Neveu, was marred by the death of event founder Sabine in a helicopter crash, his father Gilbert taking over organisation of the rally.

=== Peugeot and Citroën domination ===
The 1987 rally marked the start of an era of increased official factory participation in the car category, as French manufacturer Peugeot arrived and won the event with former World Rally champion Ari Vatanen. The 1987 event was also notable for a ferocious head-to-head duel between Neveu and Auriol in the motorcycle category, the former taking his fifth victory after Auriol was forced to drop out of the rally after breaking both ankles in a fall. The 1988 event reached its zenith in terms of entry numbers, with 603 starters. Vatanen's title defence was derailed when his Peugeot was stolen from the service area at Bamako. Though it was later found, Vatanen was subsequently disqualified from the event, victory instead going to compatriot and teammate Juha Kankkunen.

Peugeot and Vatanen returned to winning ways in 1989 and 1990, the latter marking Peugeot's final year of rally competition before switching to the World Sportscar Championship. Sister brand Citroën took Peugeot's place, Vatanen taking a third consecutive victory in 1991. The 1991 event also saw Stéphane Peterhansel take his first title in the motorcycle category with Yamaha, marking the beginning of an era of domination by the Frenchman.

For the 1992 event, the finish line moved to Cape Town, South Africa in a bid to combat a declining number of competitors (also coinciding with end of apartheid in South Africa), where GPS technology was used for the first time. Auriol became the first person to win in multiple classes after taking Mitsubishi's second victory in the car class, while Peterhansel successfully defended his motorcycle category title. The 1993 rally entry list slumped back to 153 competitors, around half of the preceding year's figure and around a quarter of that of 1988. The event was the last to be organised by Gilbert Sabine and the Amaury Sport Organisation took over the following year. With the finish line now back in its traditional location of Dakar, Bruno Saby won a third title for Mitsubishi and Peterhansel took a third straight success in the motorcycle category.

The 1994 event returned to Paris after reaching Dakar, resulting in a particularly grueling event. Pierre Lartigue took Citroën's second win in acrimonious circumstances, as Mitsubishi's leading drivers were forced to withdraw from exhaustion after traversing some particularly demanding sand dunes in the Mauritanian desert that the Citroën crews had opted to skip. Peterhansel's did not compete due to a disagreement between Yamaha and the race organizers over the regulations. Edi Orioli claimed a third title in the bikes category. The 1995 and 1996 events begin in the Spanish city of Granada, with Lartigue racking up wins for Citroën in both years. Peterhansel returned to take a fourth bikes category win in 1995, but lost to Orioli in 1996 because of refuelling problems.

=== Mitsubishi in the ascendancy ===
The 1997 rally ran exclusively in Africa for the first time, with the route running from Dakar to Agadez, Niger and back to Dakar. Citroën's withdrawal due to a rule change paved the way for Mitsubishi to take a fourth victory. Japan's Kenjiro Shinozuka became the first non-European to win the event. Peterhansel equalled Neveu's record of five motorcycle category wins in 1997, before going one better in 1998, when the event returned to its traditional Paris-Dakar route. That year, Dakar veteran Jean-Pierre Fontenay posted another win for Mitsubishi in the car class.

1999 started in Granada and was a maiden success for former Formula One and sports car driver Jean-Louis Schlesser, who had been constructing his own buggies since 1992. With the help of Renault backing, Schlesser overcame the works Mitsubishi and Nissan crews to win, whilst Peterhansel's decision to switch to the car category allowed Richard Sainct to take BMW's first title in the bikes category since 1985. Schlesser and Sainct both successfully defended their titles in 2000, traversing the route from Dakar to the Egyptian capital of Cairo.

2001 was the final time that the rally used the familiar Paris-Dakar route, and was notable for Mitsubishi's Jutta Kleinschmidt, as she was the first woman to win the rally – albeit only after Schlesser was penalised one hour for unsportsmanlike conduct. Fabrizio Meoni took the first Dakar win for Austrian manufacturer KTM, beginning a winning streak that lasted through 2019. The 2002 began in the French town of Arras and long-time Dakar participant Hiroshi Masuoka won the event for Mitsubishi (Masouka had led for much of the previous year's rally.) The 2003 rally featured an unorthodox route from Marseille to Sharm El Sheikh. Masuoka defend his title after teammate and long-time leader Peterhansel was plagued by mechanical problems in the penultimate stage. Sainct meanwhile took honours in the motorcycle category, the third title for both him and KTM.

=== Mid-2000s ===
By 2004, the entry list had increased to 595, up from 358 in 2001, with a record 688 competitors starting in 2005. Alongside Mitsubishi and Nissan, Volkswagen now boasted a full factory effort, while Schlesser's Ford-powered buggies and BMWs of the German X-raid team proved thorns in the side of the big budget works teams. The 2004 route was from Clermont-Ferrand to Dakar, and was the year Peterhansel emulated Hubert Auriol's feat of winning the rally on both two wheels and four. The Frenchman defended his title in 2005, when the rally began for the first time in Barcelona. In the bikes category, KTM continued their success with Nani Roma in 2004, who switched to the car category the following year, and Cyril Despres in 2005.

The 2006 event moved to Lisbon. Nissan pulled out having failed to provide effective opposition to Mitsubishi, who took a sixth consecutive victory, this time with former skiing champion Luc Alphand after Peterhansel committed a series of errors late in the rally. Peterhansel made amends in 2007, however, taking his third title in the car category for Mitsubishi after a close contest with Alphand after the increasingly competitive Volkswagens retired with mechanical problems. In what would be the final African event of the Dakar, Despres took his second title in the bikes category, having conceded victory in 2006 to Marc Coma after suffering an injury.

=== 2008: Hungary and Romania as a temporary replacement ===
The 2008 event, due to start in Lisbon, was cancelled on 4 January 2008 amid fears of attacks in Mauritania following the 2007 killing of four French tourists. Chile and Argentina offered to host subsequent events, which were later accepted by the ASO for the 2009 event.

Later in the year the ASO created a new event, the 2008 Central Europe Rally, to fill the void created by the cancellation of 2008 edition of the Dakar. The ASO legally deferred all entries for 2008 Dakar to this event which served as the legal 2008 edition of the Dakar in Hungary and Romania. It was intended to be part of a series known as the Dakar Series.

=== South America ===
The 2009 event, the first held in South America with a respectable 501 competitors, saw Volkswagen take its first win in the Dakar as a works entrant courtesy of Giniel de Villiers. Initially, teammate and former WRC champion Carlos Sainz led the race comfortably until crashing out, but went on to win the event in 2010. After a poor showing in 2009, Mitsubishi withdrew from the competition and left Volkswagen as the sole works entrant. The German marque won the race for a third time in 2011, this time with Nasser Al-Attiyah, before they withdrew to focus on their upcoming WRC entry and leaving the Dakar with no factory participants in the car class. In the bikes, Despres and Coma stretched KTM's incredible unbroken run of success. Both tied on three victories apiece after Coma's third win in 2011.

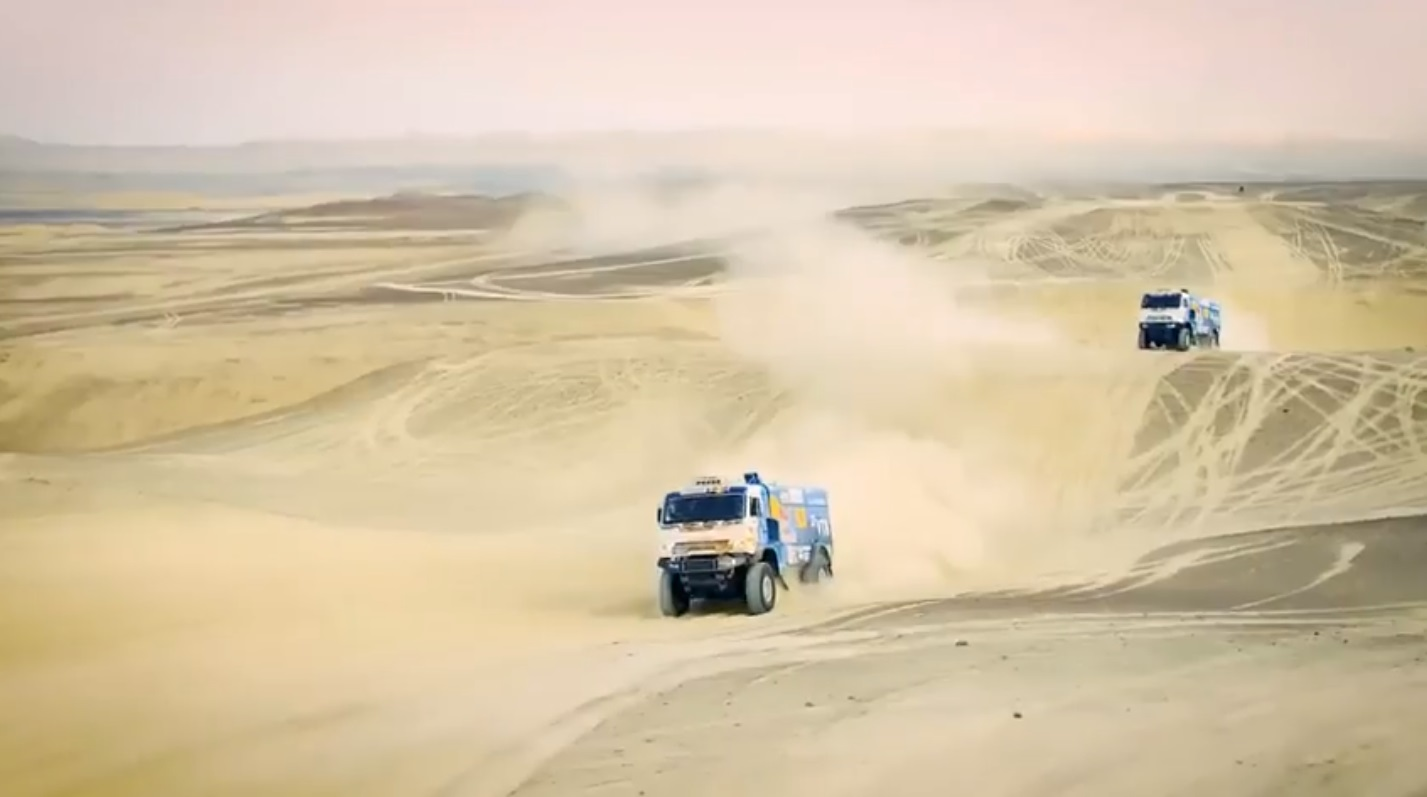
2018 rally in Peru

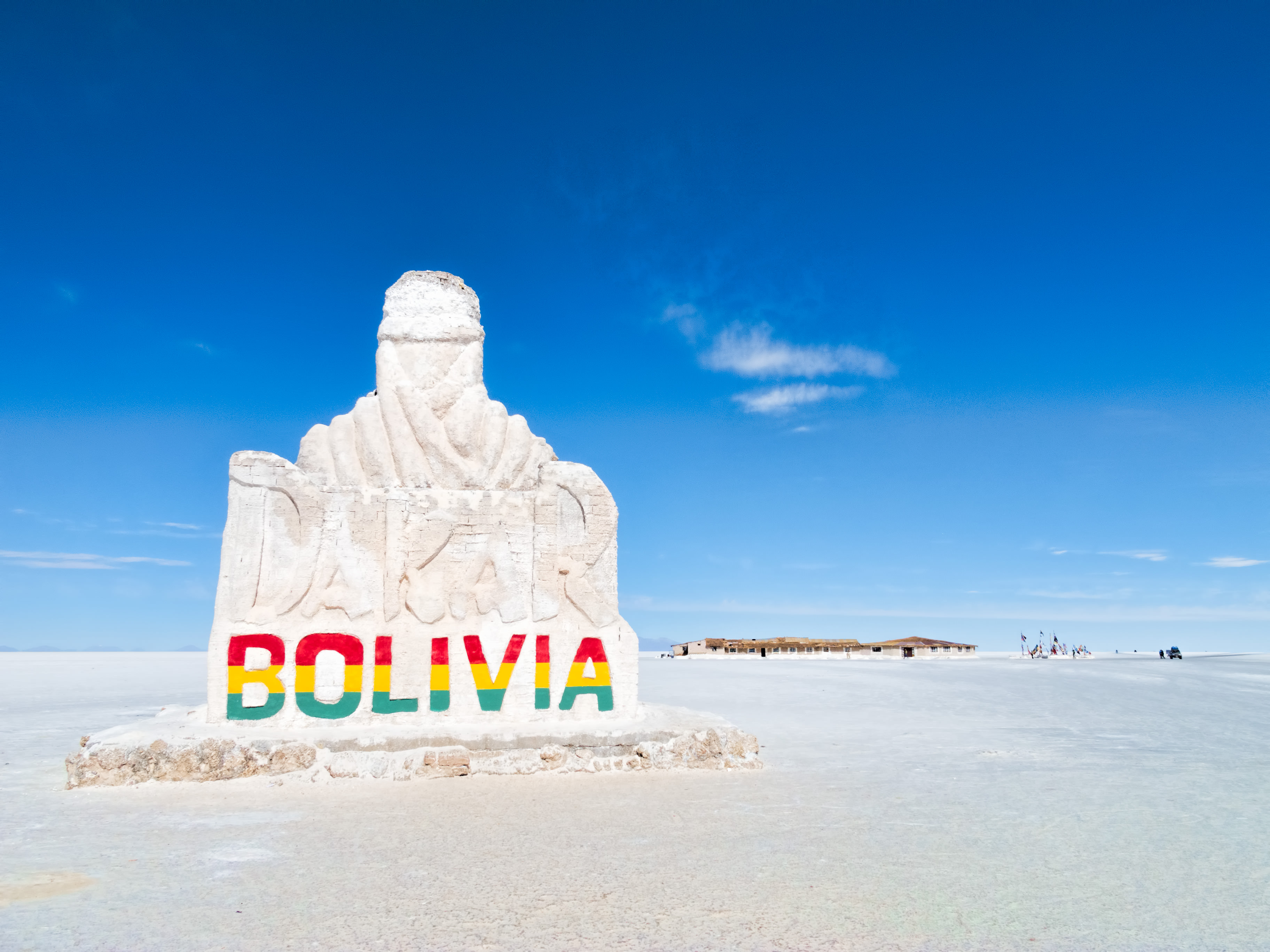
The route passed through the Salar de Uyuni in Bolivia, the world's largest salt desert.

In the 2012 rally, the X-raid team came to the fore, now using Minis in lieu of BMWs. Peterhansel had joined the team in 2010 after Mitsubishi's departure, but had been unable to challenge the Volkswagen drivers. Following Volkswagen's withdrawal, Peterhansel was able to secure his fourth win in the car category and his tenth in total, his main opposition coming from within his own team. Peterhansel successfully defended his title in 2013 as the Damen Jefferies buggies of Sainz and Al-Attiyah failed to last the distance. Despres also racked up a further two wins for KTM in the bikes class in 2012 and 2013, bringing his tally to five, aided by Coma's absence due to injury in the latter year. Coma struck back on his return to the Dakar in 2014, taking a comfortable fourth title and a 13th in succession for KTM, whilst Nani Roma emulated Auriol and Peterhansel by taking his maiden title in the cars class a decade on from his victory on two wheels – albeit only after team orders by X-raid slowed Peterhansel.

Peugeot returned for the 2015 event with an all-new, diesel-powered, two-wheel drive contender, but failed to make an impact as X-raid's Minis once more dominated. Al-Attiyah won the event in his second year for the team, while Coma racked up a fifth title in the bikes after the defection of long-time rival Despres to the car class and Peugeot. Peugeot did however see success in 2016 with Peterhansel behind the wheel, racking up his 6th win in the car category, and again in 2017 and 2018 until Peugeot decide to officially leave the competition. In 2019, which was the first Dakar Rally to be held in just one country (Peru), Toyota won for the first time with Nasser Al-Attiyah (in his third victory with three different manufacturers). The bike category saw the KTM works team rider, Australian Toby Price, take his first Dakar victory, winning his second title in 2019. Sam Sunderland and Matthias Walkner won the 2017 and 2018 edition also for the team from Mattighofen (18 overall victories as in 2019).

=== Saudi Arabia ===
Following the ASO's increasingly deteriorating relationships with South American governments, which culminated in the controversial 2019 disqualification of Bolivian quad rider Juan Carlos Salvatierra which was appealed by his team but the decision was not overturned, the rally has been held in Saudi Arabia since 2020.

Further editions were planned to also feature other Middle Eastern countries starting from 2021, as the contract with the country was only exclusive for the first year. However, the effects of the COVID-19 pandemic prevented such an expansion from happening.

The 2027 edition of the Dakar Rally will not be held in Saudi Arabia due to increased hostilities in the Middle East surrounding the 2026 Iran war, and will instead take place in a different area as a one-off. Plans are for the 2028 Rally to return to Saudi Arabia to celebrate its 50th running.

Since 2022, it is part of the World Rally-Raid Championship (W2RC) calendar.

== Vehicles and classes ==
The five competitive groups in the Dakar are the motorcycles, quads, the cars class (which ranges from buggies to small SUVs), UTVs, and the trucks class. Many vehicle manufacturers use the rally's harsh environment as both a testing ground and an opportunity to show off their vehicles' durability even though most vehicles are heavily modified from their production specification or purpose-built.

=== Motorbikes ===
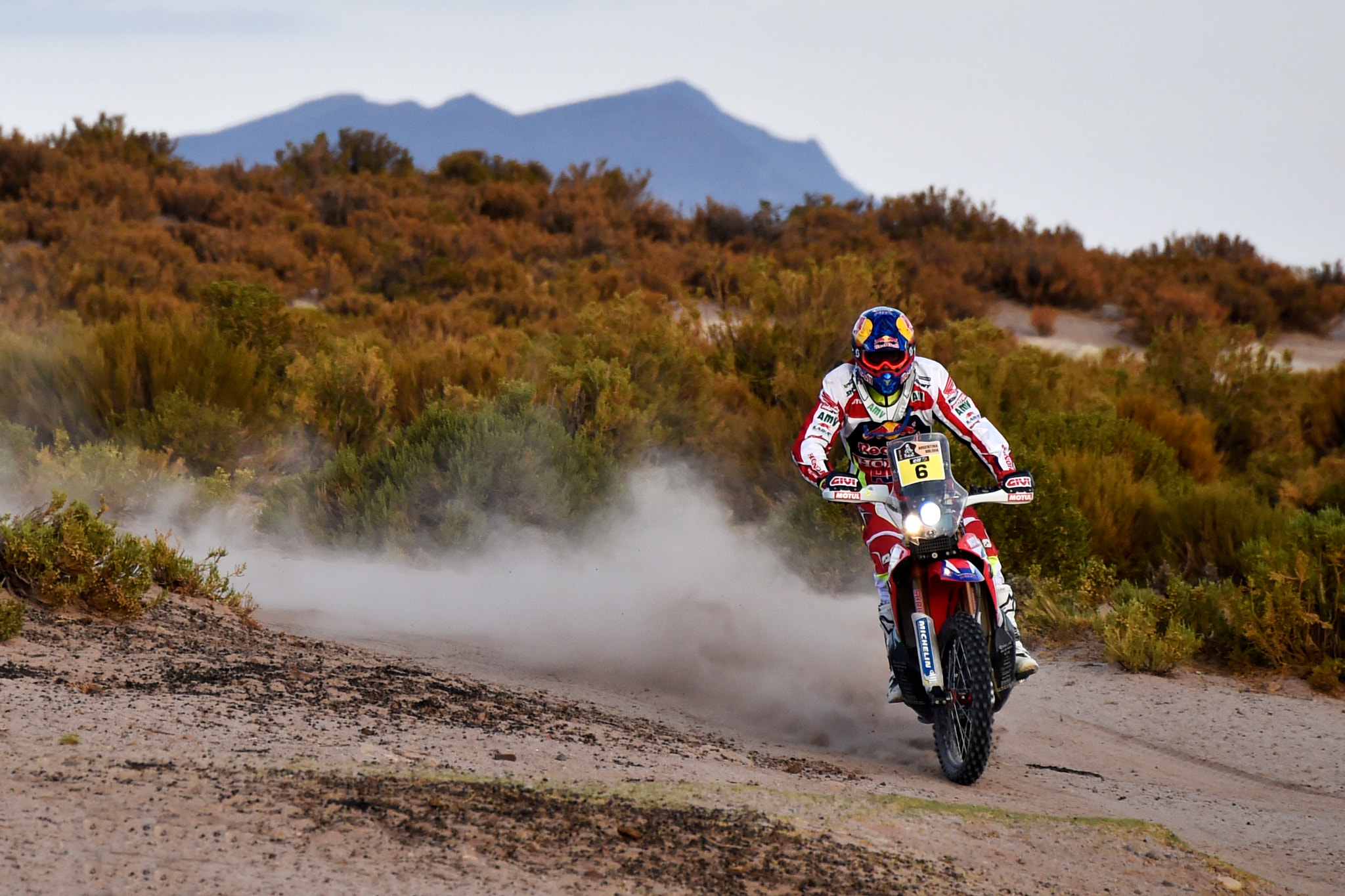
Joan Barreda racing a Honda motorcycle at the 2016 Dakar Rally

For the 2005 rally regulations introduced a limit of 450cc for twin cylinder motorbikes. Single cylinder motorbikes were still open class with no capacity limit.

As of 2011, the engine displacement limit for all motorbikes competing in the Dakar Rally is 450cc. Engines may be either single or twin cylinder. Riders are divided into two groups, RallyGP and Rally2.

A subcategory is the "Original by Motul" category (formerly named "Malle Moto" due to the only piece of luggage competitors were allowed to take with them was a "malle", the French term for a steamer trunk), which refers to motorbikes and quads competing without any kind of assistance. The organization provides assistance for this category with 4 people dedicated to the transportation of the competitors' gear between bivouac sites plus any additional equipment or belongings. This includes: 1 trunk, 1 set of wheels, 1 sleeping tent, 1 travel bag, 1 set of tyres, free use of the generators, compressors and tool-boxes, and easy access to race information. Since these competitors are not allowed to receive any outside support, each rider must service their own vehicle. It is often called the category for the toughest of the tough, and one for the Dakar purists.

KTM has dominated the motorcycle class in recent years, although Honda, Yamaha, Sherco, Hero, Husqvarna, and Gas Gas also compete currently. BMW and Cagiva have also enjoyed success in the past.

=== Quads ===
Prior to 2009, Quads were a subdivision of the motorbike category, but they were granted their own separate classification in 2009 and are designated Group 3 in the current regulations. They are divided into two subgroups – Group 3.1, which features two-wheel drive quads with a single cylinder engine with a maximum displacement of 750cc, and Group 3.2, which permits four-wheel drive quads with a maximum engine displacement of 900cc, in either single or twin cylinder layout.

Yamaha went unbeaten in the Quad category as an official class, with their main opposition coming courtesy of Honda and Can-Am.

Quads were dropped from the Dakar in 2025 due to declining manufacturer support.

=== Cars ===
The car class is made up of vehicles weighing less than 3,500 kg (7,716 lb), which are subdivided into several categories. T1 is made up of "Improved Cross-Country Vehicles", subdivided according to engine type (petrol or diesel) and drive type (two-wheel or four-wheel drive), while T2 is made up of "Cross-Country Series Production Vehicles", which are subdivided into petrol and diesel categories. There is also an "Open" category catering for vehicles conforming to SCORE International regulations.

Mini have been the most successful marque in the car category in recent years, thanks to the efforts of the non-factory X-raid team, with limited involvement currently coming from Toyota, Ford and Haval. Several constructors also produce bespoke buggies for the event, most notably SMG and Damen Jefferies.

Mitsubishi is historically the most successful manufacturer in the car class, with Volkswagen, Citroën, Peugeot and Porsche having all tasted success in the past with factory teams. Jean-Louis Schlesser has also won the event twice with his Renault-supported buggies. Factory teams from Nissan and SEAT have also won stages, as has BMW, courtesy of the X-raid team.

=== Trucks ===
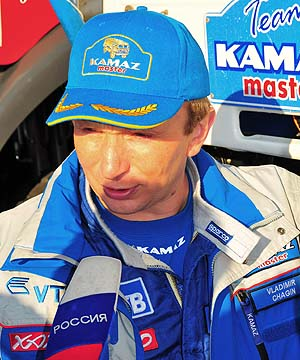
Vladimir Chagin, the "Tsar of Dakar", is the most successful truck driver.

The Truck class, first run as a separate category in 1980, is made up of vehicles weighing more than 3,500 kg (7,716 lb). Trucks participating in the competition are subdivided into "Series Production" trucks (T4.1) and "Modified" trucks (T4.2), whilst Group T4.3 (formerly known as T5) trucks are rally support trucks – meaning they travel from bivouac to bivouac to support the competition vehicles. These were introduced to the rally in 1998. The truck event was not run in 1989 after it was decided the vehicles, by this stage with twin engines generating in excess of 1000 horsepower, were too dangerous following the death of a DAF crew member in an accident during the 1988 rally.

Kamaz has dominated the truck category since the turn of the century, although it has come under increasing pressure from rivals such as Iveco, MAN, Renault, and Tatra, which enjoyed much success in the 1990s. Hino, DAF, Perlini, and Mercedes-Benz have also been among the winners in the past.

=== UTVs ===
The utility task vehicle (UTV) category was introduced in 2017. Before this, UTVs ran under the car category as the T3 class. The class rapidly gained in popularity, and in 2021 the class was further subdivided into separate T3 light prototypes category, and T4 SSVs, which are based on production vehicles.

=== Classics ===
A new Dakar Classic class was introduced in 2021 for cars and trucks manufactured before 2000, or new vehicles built to original pre-2000 specification. For the fifth edition in 2025, rules allowed another five years where 2005 became the latest specification year for the class, effectively making the rule 20 years for classification as classics.

These vehicles share the same bivouac and the organization but run in a parallel, yet different route, suitable for historic vehicles. The scoreboard is not based on fastest time, but rather on regularity rally point scoring system. The class feature a reduced entry fee, yet the same rules and fees apply for the assistance.

=== Mission 1000 ===
Mission 1000 is a category for alternative power sources such as electric, hydrogen, and hybrid vehicles. It is part of the ASO's "Dakar Future" program that debuted in 2022, while Mission 1000 was introduced in 2024.

Each Mission 1000 stage takes place across roughly 100 kilometers. Completing a stage earns 100 points, and bonus points are awarded if one can beat a given benchmark time. Points are also given out for the fastest vehicle from a standing start and for winning a fan vote during the Dakar Rally's rest day.

== List of winners ==
=== Cars, bikes and trucks ===
Year	Route	Cars		Bikes		Trucks	
Year	Route	Driver Co-driver	Make & model	Rider	Make & model	Driver Co-driver Technician	Make & model
2027	Algarve (Loulé/Faro)–Marrakesh						
2026	Yanbu-Yanbu	(Qatar) Nasser Al-Attiyah (Belgium) Fabian Lurquin	Dacia Sandrider	(Argentina) Luciano Benavides	KTM 450 Rally Factory	(Lithuania) Vaidotas Žala (Portugal) Paulo Fiuza (Netherlands) Max Van Grol	Iveco Powerstar
2025	Bisha-Shubaytah	(Saudi Arabia) Yazeed Al-Rajhi (Germany) Timo Gottschalk	Toyota Hilux Overdrive	(Australia) Daniel Sanders	KTM 450 Rally Factory	(Czech Republic) Martin Macík (Czech Republic) František Tomášek (Czech Republic) David Švanda	Iveco Powerstar
2024	al-Ula–Yanbu	(Spain) Carlos Sainz (Spain) Lucas Cruz	Audi RS Q e-tron	(United States) Ricky Brabec	Honda CRF 450 Rally	(Czech Republic) Martin Macík (Czech Republic) František Tomášek (Czech Republic) David Švanda	Iveco PowerStar
2023	near Yanbu–Dammam	(Qatar) Nasser Al-Attiyah (France) Mathieu Baumel	Toyota GR DKR Hilux	(Argentina) Kevin Benavides	KTM 450 Rally Factory Replica	(Netherlands) Janus van Kasteren (Poland) Darek Rodewald (Netherlands) Marcel Snijders	Iveco PowerStar
2022	Ḥaʼil–Jeddah	(Qatar) Nasser Al-Attiyah (France) Mathieu Baumel	Toyota GR DKR Hilux	(United Kingdom) Sam Sunderland	Gas Gas 450 Rally	Dmitry Sotnikov; Ruslan Amkhmadeev; Ilgiz Akhmetzianov	Kamaz K5 435091
2021	Jeddah–Ḥaʼil	(France) Stéphane Peterhansel (France) Édouard Boulanger	Mini John Cooper Works Buggy	(Argentina) Kevin Benavides	Honda CRF 450 Rally	(Russia) Dmitry Sotnikov (Russia) Ruslan Amkhmadeev (Russia) Ilgiz Akhmetzianov	Kamaz 43509
2020	Jeddah–Riyadh–Qiddiya City	(Spain) Carlos Sainz (Spain) Lucas Cruz	Mini John Cooper Works Buggy	(United States) Ricky Brabec	Honda CRF 450 Rally	(Russia) Andrey Karginov (Russia) Andrey Mokeev (Russia) Igor Leonov	Kamaz 43509
2019	Lima–Lima	(Qatar) Nasser Al-Attiyah (France) Mathieu Baumel	Toyota Hilux Dakar	(Australia) Toby Price	KTM 450 Rally	(Russia) Eduard Nikolaev (Russia) Evgeny Yakovlev (Russia) Vladimir Rybakov	Kamaz 43509
2018	Lima–La Paz–Córdoba	(Spain) Carlos Sainz (Spain) Lucas Cruz	Peugeot 3008 DKR Maxi	(Austria) Matthias Walkner	KTM 450 Rally	(Russia) Eduard Nikolaev (Russia) Evgeny Yakovlev (Russia) Vladimir Rybakov	Kamaz 4326-9
2017	Asunción–La Paz–Buenos Aires	(France) Stéphane Peterhansel (France) Jean-Paul Cottret	Peugeot 3008 DKR	(United Kingdom) Sam Sunderland	KTM 450 Rally	(Russia) Eduard Nikolaev (Russia) Evgeny Yakovlev (Russia) Vladimir Rybakov	Kamaz 4326-9
2016	Buenos Aires–Salta-Rosario	(France) Stéphane Peterhansel (France) Jean-Paul Cottret	Peugeot 2008 DKR	(Australia) Toby Price	KTM 450 Rally	(Netherlands) Gerard de Rooy (Spain) Moi Torrallardona (Poland) Darek Rodewald	Iveco PowerStar
2015	Buenos Aires–Iquique-Buenos Aires	(Qatar) Nasser Al-Attiyah (France) Mathieu Baumel	Mini All 4 Racing	(Spain) Marc Coma	KTM 450 Rally	(Russia) Ayrat Mardeev (Russia) Aydar Belyaev (Russia) Dmitriy Svistunov	Kamaz 4326-9
2014	Rosario-Salta–Valparaíso	(Spain) Nani Roma (France) Michel Périn	Mini All 4 Racing	(Spain) Marc Coma	KTM 450 Rally	(Russia) Andrey Karginov (Russia) Andrey Mokeev (Russia) Igor Devyatkin	Kamaz 4326-9
2013	Lima–Tucumán–Santiago	(France) Stéphane Peterhansel (France) Jean-Paul Cottret	Mini All 4 Racing	(France) Cyril Despres	KTM 450 Rally	(Russia) Eduard Nikolaev (Russia) Sergey Savostin (Russia) Vladimir Rybakov	Kamaz 4326-9
2012	Mar del Plata–Arica–Lima	(France) Stéphane Peterhansel (France) Jean-Paul Cottret	Mini All 4 Racing	(France) Cyril Despres	KTM 450 Rally	(Netherlands) Gerard de Rooy (Belgium) Tom Colsoul (Poland) Darek Rodewald	Iveco PowerStar
2011	Buenos Aires–Arica–Buenos Aires	(Qatar) Nasser Al-Attiyah (Germany) Timo Gottschalk	Volkswagen Race Touareg 3	(Spain) Marc Coma	KTM 450 Rally	(Russia) Vladimir Chagin (Russia) Sergey Savostin (Russia) Ildar Shaysultanov	Kamaz 4326-9
2010	Buenos Aires–Antofagasta–Buenos Aires	(Spain) Carlos Sainz (Spain) Lucas Cruz	Volkswagen Race Touareg 2	(France) Cyril Despres	KTM 690 Rally	(Russia) Vladimir Chagin (Russia) Sergey Savostin (Russia) Eduard Nikolaev	Kamaz 4326-9
2009	Buenos Aires–Valparaíso–Buenos Aires	(South Africa) Giniel de Villiers (Germany) Dirk von Zitzewitz	Volkswagen Race Touareg 2	(Spain) Marc Coma	KTM 690 Rally	(Russia) Firdaus Kabirov (Russia) Aydar Belyaev (Russia) Andrey Mokeev	Kamaz 4326-9
2008	Lisbon–Dakar	Cancelled					
2007	Lisbon–Dakar	(France) Stéphane Peterhansel (France) Jean-Paul Cottret	Mitsubishi Pajero Evolution	(France) Cyril Despres	KTM 690 Rally	(Netherlands) Hans Stacey (Belgium) Charly Gotlib (Netherlands) Bernard der Kinderen	MAN TGA
2006	Lisbon–Dakar	(France) Luc Alphand (France) Gilles Picard	Mitsubishi Pajero Evolution	(Spain) Marc Coma	KTM LC4 660R	(Russia) Vladimir Chagin (Russia) Semen Yakubov (Russia) Sergey Savostin	Kamaz 4911
2005	Barcelona–Dakar	(France) Stéphane Peterhansel (France) Jean-Paul Cottret	Mitsubishi Pajero Evolution	(France) Cyril Despres	KTM LC4 660R	(Russia) Firdaus Kabirov (Russia) Aydar Belyaev (Russia) Andrey Mokeev	Kamaz 4911
2004	Clermont-Ferrand–Dakar	(France) Stéphane Peterhansel (France) Jean-Paul Cottret	Mitsubishi Pajero Evolution	(Spain) Nani Roma	KTM LC4 660R	(Russia) Vladimir Chagin (Russia) Semen Yakubov (Russia) Sergey Savostin	Kamaz 4911
2003	Marseille–Sharm el Sheikh	(Japan) Hiroshi Masuoka (Germany) Andreas Schulz	Mitsubishi Pajero Evolution	(France) Richard Sainct	KTM LC4 660R	(Russia) Vladimir Chagin (Russia) Semen Yakubov (Russia) Sergey Savostin	Kamaz 4911
2002	Arras–Madrid–Dakar	(Japan) Hiroshi Masuoka (France) Pascal Maimon	Mitsubishi Pajero Evolution	(Italy) Fabrizio Meoni	KTM LC8 950R	(Russia) Vladimir Chagin (Russia) Semen Yakubov (Russia) Sergey Savostin	Kamaz 49256
2001	Paris–Dakar	(Germany) Jutta Kleinschmidt (Germany) Andreas Schulz	Mitsubishi Pajero Evolution	(Italy) Fabrizio Meoni	KTM LC4 660R	(Czech Republic) Karel Loprais (Czech Republic) Josef Kalina (Czech Republic) Petr Hamerla	Tatra 815
2000	Dakar–Cairo	(France) Jean-Louis Schlesser (Andorra) Henri Magne	Buggy Schlesser - Renault	(France) Richard Sainct	BMW F650RR	(Russia) Vladimir Chagin (Russia) Semen Yakubov (Russia) Sergey Savostin	Kamaz 49252
1999	Granada–Dakar	(France) Jean-Louis Schlesser (France) Philippe Monnet	Buggy Schlesser - Renault	(France) Richard Sainct	BMW F650RR	(Czech Republic) Karel Loprais (Czech Republic) Radomir Stachura (Czech Republic) Josef Kalina	Tatra 815
1998	Paris–Granada–Dakar	(France) Jean-Pierre Fontenay (France) Gilles Picard	Mitsubishi Pajero Evolution	(France) Stéphane Peterhansel	Yamaha XTR850R	(Czech Republic) Karel Loprais (Czech Republic) Radomir Stachura (Czech Republic) Jan Cermak	Tatra 815
1997	Dakar–Agades–Dakar	(Japan) Kenjiro Shinozuka (France) Henri Magne	Mitsubishi Pajero Type 2	(France) Stéphane Peterhansel	Yamaha XTR850R	(Austria) Peter Reif (Austria) Johann Deinhofer	Hino Ranger
1996	Granada–Dakar	(France) Pierre Lartigue (France) Michel Périn	Citroën ZX	(Italy) Edi Orioli	Yamaha XTR850R	(Russia) Viktor Moskovskikh (Russia) Anatoli Kouzmine (Russia) Nail Bagavetdinov	Kamaz 49252
1995	Granada–Dakar	(France) Pierre Lartigue (France) Michel Périn	Citroën ZX	(France) Stéphane Peterhansel	Yamaha XTR850R	(Czech Republic) Karel Loprais (Czech Republic) Radomir Stachura (Czech Republic) Tomas Tomecek	Tatra 815
1994	Paris–Dakar–Paris	(France) Pierre Lartigue (France) Michel Périn	Citroën ZX	(Italy) Edi Orioli	Cagiva Elefant	(Czech Republic) Karel Loprais (Czech Republic) Radomir Stachura (Czech Republic) Josef Kalina	Tatra 815
1993	Paris–Dakar	(France) Bruno Saby (France) Dominique Serieys	Mitsubishi Pajero Evolution	(France) Stéphane Peterhansel	Yamaha YZE 850T	(Italy) Francesco Perlini (Italy) Giorgio Albiero (Italy) Claudio Vinante	Perlini 105F
1992	Paris–Sirte–Cape Town	(France) Hubert Auriol (France) Philippe Monnet	Mitsubishi Pajero Evolution	(France) Stéphane Peterhansel	Yamaha YZE 850T	(Italy) Francesco Perlini (Italy) Giorgio Albiero (Italy) Claudio Vinante	Perlini 105F
1991	Paris–Tripoli–Dakar	(Finland) Ari Vatanen (Sweden) Bruno Berglund	Citroën ZX	(France) Stéphane Peterhansel	Yamaha YZE 750T	(France) Jacques Houssat (France) Thierry de Saulieu (Italy) Danilo Bottaro	Perlini 105F
1990	Paris–Tripoli–Dakar	(Finland) Ari Vatanen (Sweden) Bruno Berglund	Peugeot 405 T16	(Italy) Edi Orioli	Cagiva Elefant	(Italy) Giorgio Villa (Italy) Giorgio Delfino (Italy) Claudio Vinante	Perlini 105F
1989	Paris–Tunis–Dakar	(Finland) Ari Vatanen (Sweden) Bruno Berglund	Peugeot 405 T16	(France) Gilles Lalay	Honda NXR800V	Not held	
1988	Paris–Alger–Dakar	(Finland) Juha Kankkunen (Finland) Juha Piironen	Peugeot 205 T16	(Italy) Edi Orioli	Honda NXR800V	(Czechoslovakia) Karel Loprais (Czech Republic) Radomir Stachura (Czech Republic) Tomas Muck	Tatra 815
1987	Paris-Alger–Dakar	(Finland) Ari Vatanen (France) Bernard Giroux	Peugeot 205 T16	(France) Cyril Neveu	Honda NXR750V	(Netherlands) Jan de Rooy (Belgium) Yvo Geusens (Netherlands) Theo van de Rijt	DAF TurboTwin II
1986	Paris-Alger–Dakar	(France) René Metge (France) Dominique Lemoyne	Porsche 959	(France) Cyril Neveu	Honda NXR750V	(Italy) Giacomo Vismara (Italy) Giulio Minelli	Mercedes-Benz U 1300 L
1985	Paris-Alger–Dakar	(France) Patrick Zaniroli (France) Jean da Silva	Mitsubishi Pajero Evolution	(Belgium) Gaston Rahier	BMW R80G/S	(Germany) Karl-Friedrich Capito (Germany) Jost Capito (Germany) Klaus Schweikarl	Mercedes-Benz 1936 AK
1984	Paris-Alger–Dakar	(France) René Metge (France) Dominique Lemoyne	Porsche 911 (953)	(Belgium) Gaston Rahier	BMW R80G/S	(France) Pierre Laleu (France) Daniel Durce (France) Patrick Venturini	Mercedes-Benz 1936 AK
1983	Paris-Alger–Dakar	(Belgium) Jacky Ickx (France) Claude Brasseur	Mercedes 280 GE	(France) Hubert Auriol	BMW R80G/S	(France) Georges Groine (France) Thierry de Saulieu (France) Bernard Malferiol	Mercedes-Benz 1936 AK
1982	Paris-Alger–Dakar	(France) Claude Marreau (France) Bernard Marreau	Renault 20 Turbo 4X4	(France) Cyril Neveu	Honda XR550	(France) Georges Groine (France) Thierry de Saulieu (France) Bernard Malferiol	Mercedes-Benz U 1700 L
1981	Paris–Dakar	(France) René Metge (France) Bernard Giroux	Range Rover	(France) Hubert Auriol	BMW R80G/S	(France) Adrien Villette (France) Henri Gabrelle (France) Alain Voillereau	ALM/ACMAT
1980	Paris–Dakar	(Sweden) Freddy Kottulinsky (Germany) Gerd Löffelmann	Volkswagen Iltis	(France) Cyril Neveu	Yamaha XT500	(Algeria) Miloud Ataouat (Algeria) Hadj Daou Boukrif (Algeria) Mahiedine Kaloua	Sonacome M210
1979	Paris–Dakar	(France) Alain Génestier (France) Joseph Terbiaut (France) Jean Lemordant	Range Rover	(France) Cyril Neveu	Yamaha XT500	Not held	

=== Quads ===
Year	Route	Quads	
Year	Route	Rider	Make & model
2024	Al-'Ula–Yanbu	(Argentina) Manuel Andújar	Yamaha Raptor 700
2023	near Yanbu–Dammam	(France) Alexandre Giroud	Yamaha Raptor 700
2022	Ḥaʼil–Jeddah	(France) Alexandre Giroud	Yamaha Raptor 700
2021	Jeddah–Ḥaʼil	(Argentina) Manuel Andújar	Yamaha Raptor 700
2020	Jeddah–Riyadh–Qiddiya City	(Chile) Ignacio Casale	Yamaha Raptor 700
2019	Lima–Lima	(Argentina) Nicolás Cavigliasso	Yamaha Raptor 700
2018	Lima–La Paz–Córdoba	(Chile) Ignacio Casale	Yamaha Raptor 700
2017	Asunción–La Paz–Buenos Aires	(Russia) Sergey Karyakin	Yamaha Raptor 700
2016	Buenos Aires–Salta-Rosario	(Argentina) Marcos Patronelli	Yamaha Raptor 700
2015	Buenos Aires–Iquique-Buenos Aires	(Poland) Rafał Sonik	Yamaha Raptor 700
2014	Rosario-Salta–Valparaíso	(Chile) Ignacio Casale	Yamaha Raptor 700
2013	Lima–Tucumán–Santiago	(Argentina) Marcos Patronelli	Yamaha Raptor 700
2012	Mar del Plata–Arica–Lima	(Argentina) Alejandro Patronelli	Yamaha Raptor 700
2011	Buenos Aires–Arica–Buenos Aires	(Argentina) Alejandro Patronelli	Yamaha Raptor 700
2010	Buenos Aires–Antofagasta–Buenos Aires	(Argentina) Marcos Patronelli	Yamaha Raptor 700
2009	Buenos Aires–Valparaíso–Buenos Aires	(Czech Republic) Josef Macháček	Yamaha Raptor 700

=== SSVs, Light Prototypes and Stock ===
Year	Route	SSVs (UTVs until 2022)		Light Prototypes (T3)		Stock	
Year	Route	Rider	Make & model	Driver Co-driver	Make & model	Driver Co-driver	Make & model
2026	Yanbu–Yanbu	(United States) Brock Heger (United States) Max Eddy	Polaris RZR Pro R	(Spain) Pau Navarro (Spain) Jan Rosa Viña	Taurus T3 Max	(Lithuania) Rokas Baciuška (Spain) Oriol Vidal	Defender Dakar D7X-R
2025	Bisha–Shubaytah	(United States) Brock Heger (United States) Max Eddy	Polaris RZR Pro R	(Argentina) Nicolás Cavigliasso (Argentina) Valentina Pertegarini	Taurus T3 Max	Not held	
2024	Al-'Ula–Yanbu	(France) Xavier de Soultrait (France) Martin Bonnet	Polaris RZR Pro R	(Spain) Cristina Gutiérrez (Spain) Pablo Moreno Huete	Taurus T3 Max	Not held	
2023	near Yanbu–Dammam	(Poland) Eryk Goczał (Spain) Oriol Mena	Can-Am Maverick X3	(United States) Austin Jones (Brazil) Gustavo Gugelmin	Can-Am Maverick XRS	Not held	
2022	Ḥaʼil–Jeddah	(United States) Austin Jones (Brazil) Gustavo Gugelmin	Can-Am Maverick X3	(Chile) Francisco López Contardo (Chile) Juan Pablo Latrach Vinagre	Can-Am XRS	Not held	
2021	Jeddah–Ḥaʼil	(Chile) Francisco López Contardo (Chile) Juan Pablo Latrach Vinagre	Can-Am Maverick X3	(Czech Republic) Josef Macháček (Czech Republic) Pavel Vyoral	Can-Am	Not held	
2020	Jeddah–Riyadh–Qiddiya City	(United States) Casey Currie (United States) Sean Berriman	Can-Am Maverick X3	Not held		Not held	
2019	Lima–Lima	(Chile) Francisco López Contardo (Chile) Alvaro Quintanilla	Can-Am Maverick X3	Not held		Not held	
2018	Lima–La Paz–Córdoba	(Brazil) Reinaldo Varela (Brazil) Gustavo Gugelmin	Can-Am Maverick X3	Not held		Not held	
2017	Asunción–La Paz–Buenos Aires	(Brazil) Leandro Torres (Brazil) Lourival Roldan	Polaris RZR 1000 XP	Not held		Not held	

=== Classics and Mission 1000 ===
Year	Route	Classics		Mission 1000	
Year	Route	Driver Co-driver	Make & model	Driver Co-driver	Make & model
2026	Yanbu–Yanbu	(Lithuania) Karolis Raišys (France) Christophe Marques	Land Rover Series III 109	(Spain) Jordi Juvanteny (Spain) José Luis Criado (Spain) Xavier Ribas	MAN TGA
2025	Bisha–Shubaytah	(Spain) Carlos Santaolalla (Spain) Jan Rosa i Viñas	Toyota Land Cruiser HDJ80	(Spain) Jordi Juvanteny (Spain) José Luis Criado (Spain) Xavier Ribas	MAN TGA 26.480
2024	Al-'Ula–Yanbu	(Spain) Carlos Santaolalla (Spain) Jan Rosa i Viñas	Toyota Land Cruiser HDJ80	(Spain) Jordi Juvanteny (Spain) José Luis Criado (Spain) Xavier Ribas	MAN TGA 26.480
2023	near Yanbu–Dammam	(Spain) Juan Morera (Spain) Lidia Ruba	Toyota Land Cruiser HDJ80	Not held	
2022	Ḥaʼil–Jeddah	(France) Serge Mogno (France) Florent Drulhon	Toyota Land Cruiser HDJ80	Not held	
2021	Jeddah–Ḥaʼil	(France) Marc Douton (France) Emilien Etienne	Sunhill Buggy	Not held	

== Podium ==
=== Cars ===
Year	1st		2nd		3rd	
Year	Driver	Car	Driver	Car	Driver	Car
1979	(France) Alain Génestier	Range Rover V8	(France) Claude Marreau	Renault 4 Sinpar	(Italy) Cesare Giraudo	Fiat Campagnola
1980	(Sweden) Freddy Kottulinsky	Volkswagen Iltis	(France) Patrick Zaniroli	Volkswagen Iltis	(France) Claude Marreau	Renault 4 Sinpar
1981	(France) René Metge	Range Rover V8	(France) Hervé Cotel	Buggy Cotel	(France) Jean-Claude Briavoine	Lada Niva
1982	(France) Claude Marreau	Renault 20 Turbo	(France) Jean-Claude Briavoine	Lada Niva	(France) Jean-Pierre Jaussaud	Mercedes 280 GE
1983	(Belgium) Jacky Ickx	Mercedes 280 GE	(France) André Trossat	Lada Niva	(France) Pierre Lartigue	Range Rover V8
1984	(France) René Metge	Porsche 911	(France) Patrick Zaniroli	Range Rover V8	(United Kingdom) Andrew Cowan	Mitsubishi Pajero Evolution
1985	(France) Patrick Zaniroli	Mitsubishi Pajero Evolution	(United Kingdom) Andrew Cowan	Mitsubishi Pajero Evolution	(France) Pierre Fougerouse	Toyota FJ 60
1986	(France) René Metge	Porsche 959	(Belgium) Jacky Ickx	Porsche 959	(France) Pascal Rigal	Mitsubishi Pajero Evolution
1987	(Finland) Ari Vatanen	Peugeot 205 Turbo 16	(France) Patrick Zaniroli	Range Rover V8	(Japan) Kenjiro Shinozuka	Mitsubishi Pajero Evolution
1988	(Finland) Juha Kankkunen	Peugeot 205 Turbo 16	(Japan) Kenjiro Shinozuka	Mitsubishi Pajero Evolution	(France) Patrick Tambay	Range Rover V8
1989	(Finland) Ari Vatanen	Peugeot 405 Turbo 16	(Belgium) Jacky Ickx	Peugeot 405 Turbo 16	(France) Patrick Tambay	Mitsubishi Pajero Evolution
1990	(Finland) Ari Vatanen	Peugeot 405 Turbo 16	(Sweden) Björn Waldegård	Peugeot 405 Turbo 16	(France) Alain Ambrosino	Peugeot 405 Turbo 16
1991	(Finland) Ari Vatanen	Citroën ZX Rallye-Raid	(France) Pierre Lartigue	Mitsubishi Pajero Evolution	(France) Jean Pierre Fontenay	Mitsubishi Pajero Evolution
1992	(France) Hubert Auriol	Mitsubishi Pajero Evolution	(Germany) Erwin Weber	Mitsubishi Pajero Evolution	(Japan) Kenjiro Shinozuka	Mitsubishi Pajero Evolution
1993	(France) Bruno Saby	Mitsubishi Pajero Evolution	(France) Pierre Lartigue	Citroën ZX Rallye-Raid	(France) Hubert Auriol	Citroën ZX Rallye-Raid
1994	(France) Pierre Lartigue	Citroën ZX Rallye-Raid	(France) Hubert Auriol	Citroën ZX Rallye-Raid	(France) Philippe Wambergue	Buggy Bourgoin
1995	(France) Pierre Lartigue	Citroën ZX Rallye-Raid	(France) Bruno Saby	Mitsubishi Pajero Evolution	(Japan) Kenjiro Shinozuka	Mitsubishi Pajero Evolution
1996	(France) Pierre Lartigue	Citroën ZX Rallye-Raid	(France) Philippe Wambergue	Citroën ZX Rallye-Raid	(France) Jean Pierre Fontenay	Mitsubishi Pajero Evolution
1997	(Japan) Kenjiro Shinozuka	Mitsubishi Pajero Evolution	(France) Jean-Pierre Fontenay	Mitsubishi Pajero Evolution	(France) Bruno Saby	Mitsubishi Pajero Evolution
1998	(France) Jean-Pierre Fontenay	Mitsubishi Pajero Evolution	(Japan) Kenjiro Shinozuka	Mitsubishi Pajero Evolution	(France) Bruno Saby	Mitsubishi Pajero Evolution
1999	(France) Jean-Louis Schlesser	Buggy Schlesser	(Spain) Miguel Prieto	Mitsubishi Pajero Evolution	(Germany) Jutta Kleinschmidt	Mitsubishi Pajero Evolution
2000	(France) Jean-Louis Schlesser	Buggy Schlesser	(France) Stéphane Peterhansel	Mega Desert	(France) Jean-Pierre Fontenay	Mitsubishi Pajero Evolution
2001	(Germany) Jutta Kleinschmidt	Mitsubishi Pajero Evolution	(Japan) Hiroshi Masuoka	Mitsubishi Pajero Evolution	(France) Jean-Louis Schlesser	Buggy Schlesser
2002	(Japan) Hiroshi Masuoka	Mitsubishi Pajero Evolution	(Germany) Jutta Kleinschmidt	Mitsubishi Pajero Evolution	(Japan) Kenjiro Shinozuka	Mitsubishi Pajero Evolution
2003	(Japan) Hiroshi Masuoka	Mitsubishi Pajero Evolution	(France) Jean-Pierre Fontenay	Mitsubishi Pajero Evolution	(France) Stéphane Peterhansel	Mitsubishi Pajero Evolution
2004	(France) Stéphane Peterhansel	Mitsubishi Pajero Evolution	(Japan) Hiroshi Masuoka	Mitsubishi Pajero Evolution	(France) Jean-Louis Schlesser	Buggy Schlesser
2005	(France) Stéphane Peterhansel	Mitsubishi Pajero Evolution	(France) Luc Alphand	Mitsubishi Pajero Evolution	(Germany) Jutta Kleinschmidt	Volkswagen Race Touareg 2
2006	(France) Luc Alphand	Mitsubishi Pajero Evolution	(South Africa) Giniel de Villiers	Volkswagen Race Touareg 2	(Spain) Nani Roma	Mitsubishi Pajero Evolution
2007	(France) Stéphane Peterhansel	Mitsubishi Pajero Evolution	(France) Luc Alphand	Mitsubishi Pajero Evolution	(France) Jean-Louis Schlesser	Buggy Schlesser
2008	Cancelled					
2009	(South Africa) Giniel de Villiers	Volkswagen Race Touareg 2	(United States) Mark Miller	Volkswagen Race Touareg 2	(United States) Robby Gordon	Hummer H3
2010	(Spain) Carlos Sainz	Volkswagen Race Touareg 2	(Qatar) Nasser Al-Attiyah	Volkswagen Race Touareg 2	(United States) Mark Miller	Volkswagen Race Touareg 2
2011	(Qatar) Nasser Al-Attiyah	Volkswagen Race Touareg 3	(South Africa) Giniel de Villiers	Volkswagen Race Touareg 3	(Spain) Carlos Sainz	Volkswagen Race Touareg 3
2012	(France) Stéphane Peterhansel	Mini All4 Racing	(Spain) Nani Roma	Mini All4 Racing	(South Africa) Giniel de Villiers	Toyota Hilux Dakar
2013	(France) Stéphane Peterhansel	Mini All4 Racing	(South Africa) Giniel de Villiers	Toyota Hilux Dakar	(Russia) Leonid Novitskiy	Mini All4 Racing
2014	(Spain) Nani Roma	Mini All4 Racing	(France) Stéphane Peterhansel	Mini All4 Racing	(Qatar) Nasser Al-Attiyah	Mini All4 Racing
2015	(Qatar) Nasser Al-Attiyah	Mini All4 Racing	(South Africa) Giniel de Villiers	Toyota Hilux Dakar	(Poland) Krzysztof Hołowczyc	Mini All4 Racing
2016	(France) Stéphane Peterhansel	Peugeot 2008 DKR	(Qatar) Nasser Al-Attiyah	Mini All4 Racing	(South Africa) Giniel de Villiers	Toyota Hilux Dakar
2017	(France) Stéphane Peterhansel	Peugeot 3008 DKR	(France) Sébastien Loeb	Peugeot 3008 DKR	(France) Cyril Despres	Peugeot 3008 DKR
2018	(Spain) Carlos Sainz	Peugeot 3008 DKR	(Qatar) Nasser Al-Attiyah	Toyota Hilux Dakar	(South Africa) Giniel de Villiers	Toyota Hilux Dakar
2019	(Qatar) Nasser Al-Attiyah	Toyota Hilux Dakar	(Spain) Nani Roma	Mini All4 Racing	(France) Sébastien Loeb	Peugeot 3008 DKR
2020	(Spain) Carlos Sainz	Mini John Cooper Works Buggy	(Qatar) Nasser Al-Attiyah	Toyota Hilux Dakar	(France) Stéphane Peterhansel	Mini John Cooper Works Buggy
2021	(France) Stéphane Peterhansel	Mini John Cooper Works Buggy	(Qatar) Nasser Al-Attiyah	Toyota Hilux Dakar	(Spain) Carlos Sainz	Mini John Cooper Works Buggy
2022	(Qatar) Nasser Al-Attiyah	Toyota GR DKR Hilux	(France) Sébastien Loeb	BRX Hunter T1+	(Saudi Arabia) Yazeed Al-Rajhi	Toyota Hilux Overdrive
2023	(Qatar) Nasser Al-Attiyah	Toyota GR DKR Hilux	(France) Sébastien Loeb	Prodrive Hunter T1+	(Brazil) Lucas Moraes	Toyota Hilux Overdrive
2024	(Spain) Carlos Sainz	Audi RS Q e-tron	(Belgium) Guillaume De Mévius	Toyota Hilux Overdrive	(France) Sébastien Loeb	Prodrive Hunter T1+
2025	(Saudi Arabia) Yazeed Al-Rajhi	Toyota Hilux Overdrive	(South Africa) Henk Lategan	Toyota GR DKR Hilux	(Sweden) Mattias Ekström	Ford Raptor T1+
2026	(Qatar) Nasser Al-Attiyah	Dacia Sandrider	(Spain) Nani Roma	Ford Raptor T1+	(Sweden) Mattias Ekström	Ford Raptor T1+

=== Bikes ===
Year	1st		2nd		3rd	
Year	Driver	Bike	Driver	Bike	Driver	Bike
1979	(France) Cyril Neveu	Yamaha XT 500	(France) Gilles Comte	Yamaha XT 500	(France) Philippe Vassard	Honda XL 250
1980	(France) Cyril Neveu	Yamaha XT 500	(France) Michel Merel	Yamaha XT 500	(France) Jean-Noël Pineau	Yamaha XT 500
1981	(France) Hubert Auriol	BMW R80 G/S	(France) Serge Bacou	Yamaha XT 500	(France) Michel Merel	Yamaha XT 500
1982	(France) Cyril Neveu	Honda XR 550	(France) Philippe Vassard	Honda XR 550	(France) Grégoire Verhaeghe	Barigo 500
1983	(France) Hubert Auriol	BMW R80 G/S	(France) Patrick Drobecq	Honda XR 600	(France) Marc Joineau	Suzuki DR 500
1984	(Belgium) Gaston Rahier	BMW R80 G/S	(France) Hubert Auriol	BMW R80 G/S	(France) Philippe Vassard	Honda XLR 600
1985	(Belgium) Gaston Rahier	BMW R80 G/S	(France) Jean-Claude Olivier	Yamaha 660 Proto	(Italy) Franco Picco	Yamaha 600 XT
1986	(France) Cyril Neveu	Honda NXR 780	(France) Gilles Lalay	Honda NXR 780	(Italy) Andrea Balestrieri	Honda XL 600
1987	(France) Cyril Neveu	Honda NXR 750	(Italy) Edi Orioli	Honda XL 600	(Belgium) Gaston Rahier	BMW R80 GS
1988	(Italy) Edi Orioli	Honda NXR 800V	(Italy) Franco Picco	Yamaha YZE 750	(France) Gilles Lalay	Honda NXR 750
1989	(France) Gilles Lalay	Honda NXR 800V	(Italy) Franco Picco	Yamaha YZE 750	(France) Marc Morales	Honda NXR 750
1990	(Italy) Edi Orioli	Cagiva Elefant 900	(Spain) Carles Mas	Yamaha YZE 750	(Italy) Alessandro De Petri	Cagiva Elefant 900
1991	(France) Stéphane Peterhansel	Yamaha YZE 750T	(France) Gilles Lalay	Yamaha YZE 750T	(France) Thierry Magnaldi	Yamaha YZE 750T
1992	(France) Stéphane Peterhansel	Yamaha YZE 850T	(United States) Danny LaPorte	Cagiva Elefant 900	(Spain) Jordi Arcarons	Cagiva Elefant 900
1993	(France) Stéphane Peterhansel	Yamaha YZE 850T	(France) Thierry Charbonnier	Yamaha YZE 850T	(Spain) Jordi Arcarons	Yamaha YZE 850T
1994	(Italy) Edi Orioli	Cagiva Elefant 900	(Spain) Jordi Arcarons	Cagiva Elefant 900	(Italy) Fabrizio Meoni	Honda EXP-2
1995	(France) Stéphane Peterhansel	Yamaha YZE 850T	(Spain) Jordi Arcarons	Cagiva Elefant 900	(Italy) Edi Orioli	Cagiva Elefant 900
1996	(Italy) Edi Orioli	Yamaha YZE 850T	(Spain) Jordi Arcarons	KTM LC4	(Spain) Carlos Sotelo	KTM LC4
1997	(France) Stéphane Peterhansel	Yamaha YZE 850T	(Spain) Oscar Gallardo	Cagiva Elefant 900	(France) David Castera	Yamaha YZE 850T
1998	(France) Stéphane Peterhansel	Yamaha YZE 850T	(Italy) Fabrizio Meoni	KTM LC4	(Australia) Andrew Haydon	KTM LC4
1999	(France) Richard Sainct	BMW F650 RR	(France) Thierry Magnaldi	KTM LC4	(South Africa) Alfie Cox	KTM LC4
2000	(France) Richard Sainct	BMW F650 RR	(Spain) Oscar Gallardo	BMW F650 RR	(United States) Jimmy Lewis	BMW R900 GS
2001	(Italy) Fabrizio Meoni	KTM LC4 660R	(Spain) Jordi Arcarons	KTM LC4 660R	(Chile) Carlo de Gavardo	KTM LC4 660R
2002	(Italy) Fabrizio Meoni	KTM LC8 950R	(South Africa) Alfie Cox	KTM LC4 660R	(France) Richard Sainct	KTM LC4 660R
2003	(France) Richard Sainct	KTM LC4 660R	(France) Cyril Despres	KTM LC4 660R	(Italy) Fabrizio Meoni	KTM LC8 950R
2004	(Spain) Nani Roma	KTM LC4 660R	(France) Richard Sainct	KTM LC4 660R	(France) Cyril Despres	KTM LC4 660R
2005	(France) Cyril Despres	KTM LC4 660R	(Spain) Marc Coma	KTM LC4 660R	(South Africa) Alfie Cox	KTM LC4 660R
2006	(Spain) Marc Coma	KTM LC4 660R	(France) Cyril Despres	KTM LC4 660R	(Italy) Giovanni Sala	KTM LC4 660R
2007	(France) Cyril Despres	KTM 690 Rally	(France) David Casteu	KTM 690 Rally	(United States) Chris Blais	KTM 660 Rally
2008	Cancelled					
2009	(Spain) Marc Coma	KTM 690 Rally	(France) Cyril Despres	KTM 690 Rally	(France) David Frétigné	Yamaha WR 450
2010	(France) Cyril Despres	KTM 690 Rally	(Norway) Pål Anders Ullevålseter	KTM 690 Rally	(Chile) Francisco López	Aprilia RXV 450
2011	(Spain) Marc Coma	KTM 450 Rally	(France) Cyril Despres	KTM 450 Rally	(Portugal) Hélder Rodrigues	Yamaha WR 450F
2012	(France) Cyril Despres	KTM 450 Rally	(Spain) Marc Coma	KTM 450 Rally	(Portugal) Hélder Rodrigues	Yamaha WR 450F
2013	(France) Cyril Despres	KTM 450 Rally	(Portugal) Ruben Faria	KTM 450 Rally	(Chile) Francisco López	KTM 450 Rally
2014	(Spain) Marc Coma	KTM 450 Rally	(Spain) Jordi Viladoms	KTM 450 Rally	(France) Olivier Pain	Yamaha WR 450F
2015	(Spain) Marc Coma	KTM 450 Rally	(Portugal) Paulo Gonçalves	Honda CRF 450	(Australia) Toby Price	KTM 450 Rally
2016	(Australia) Toby Price	KTM 450 Rally	(Slovakia) Štefan Svitko	KTM 450 Rally	(Chile) Pablo Quintanilla	Husqvarna FR 450
2017	(United Kingdom) Sam Sunderland	KTM 450 Rally	(Austria) Matthias Walkner	KTM 450 Rally	(Spain) Gerard Farrés	KTM 450 Rally
2018	(Austria) Matthias Walkner	KTM 450 Rally	(Argentina) Kevin Benavides	Honda CRF 450	(Australia) Toby Price	KTM 450 Rally
2019	(Australia) Toby Price	KTM 450 Rally	(Austria) Matthias Walkner	KTM 450 Rally	(United Kingdom) Sam Sunderland	KTM 450 Rally
2020	(United States) Ricky Brabec	Honda CRF 450 Rally	(Chile) Pablo Quintanilla	Husqvarna FR 450	(Australia) Toby Price	KTM 450 Rally
2021	(Argentina) Kevin Benavides	Honda CRF 450 Rally	(United States) Ricky Brabec	Honda CRF 450 Rally	(United Kingdom) Sam Sunderland	KTM 450 Rally
2022	(United Kingdom) Sam Sunderland	Gas Gas 450 Rally	(Chile) Pablo Quintanilla	Honda CRF450 Rally	(Austria) Matthias Walkner	KTM 450 Rally
2023	(Argentina) Kevin Benavides	KTM 450 Rally	(Australia) Toby Price	KTM 450 Rally	(United States) Skyler Howes	Husqvarna 450 Rally
2024	(United States) Ricky Brabec	Honda CRF 450 Rally	(Botswana) Ross Branch	Hero 450 Rally	(France) Adrien Van Beveren	Honda CRF 450 Rally
2025	(Australia) Daniel Sanders	KTM 450 Rally	(Spain) Tosha Schareina	Honda CRF 450 Rally	(France) Adrien Van Beveren	Honda CRF 450 Rally
2026	(Argentina) Luciano Benavides	KTM 450 Rally	(United States) Ricky Brabec	Honda CRF 450 Rally	(Spain) Tosha Schareina	Honda CRF 450 Rally

=== Trucks ===
Year	1st		2nd		3rd	
Year	Crew	Truck	Crew	Truck	Crew	Truck
1980	(Algeria) Miloud Ataouat (Algeria) Hadj Daou Boukrif (Algeria) Mahiedine Kaloua	Sonacome	(France) Bernard Heu (France) Daniel Delobel (France) Gilbert Versino	MAN	(Algeria) Mokran Bouzid (Algeria) Daid (Algeria) Mekhelef	Sonacome
1981	(France) Adrien Villette (France) Henri Gabrelle (France) Alain Voillereau	ALM-ACMAT	(France) Jacques Briy (France) Jean Salou (France) Gustave Peu	Ford	(France) Georges Groine (France) Thierry de Saulieu (France) Bernard Malferiol	Mercedes-Benz
1982	(France) Georges Groine (France) Thierry de Saulieu (France) Bernard Malferiol	Mercedes-Benz	(France) Pierre Laleu (France) Bernard Langlois	Mercedes-Benz	(Netherlands) Jan de Rooy (Netherlands) Gérard Straetmans	DAF
1983	(France) Georges Groine (France) Thierry de Saulieu (France) Bernard Malferiol	Mercedes-Benz	(Sweden) Hasse Henriksson (Sweden) Sture Bernhardsson (Sweden) John Granäng	Volvo C303	(Netherlands) Jan de Rooy (Netherlands) Joop Roggeband (Belgium) Yvo Geusens	DAF
1984	(France) Pierre Laleu (France) Daniel Durce (France) Patrick Venturini	Mercedes-Benz	(Italy) Paolo Bonera (Italy) Valerio Grassi (Italy) Paolo Travaglia	Mercedes-Benz	(France) Henri Gabrelle (France) Alain Voillereau (Germany) Adolf Dirl	MAN
1985	(Germany) Karl Friedrich Capito (Germany) Jost Capito (Germany) Klaus Schweikarl	Mercedes-Benz	(Netherlands) Jan de Rooy (France) Thierry de Saulieu (Netherlands) Martinus Ketelaars	DAF	(Germany) Karl Wilhelm Strohmann (Germany) Volker Capito (Germany) Heinz Schnepf	Mercedes-Benz
1986	(Italy) Giacomo Vismara (Italy) Giulio Minelli	Mercedes-Benz	(Germany) Hans Heyer (Germany) Aldo Winkler	MAN	(Spain) Salvador Cañellas (Spain) Domenech Ferran	Pegaso
1987	(Netherlands) Jan de Rooy (Belgium) Yvo Geusens (Netherlands) Theo van de Rijt	DAF	(Czech Republic) Karel Loprais (Czech Republic) Radomír Stachura (Czech Republic) Jaroslav Krpec	Tatra	(Czech Republic) Jiří Moskal (Czech Republic) Jaroslav Joklík (Czech Republic) Pavel Záleský	LIAZ
1988	(Czech Republic) Karel Loprais (Czech Republic) Radomír Stachura (Czech Republic) Tomáš Mück	Tatra	(Czech Republic) Jiří Moskal (Czech Republic) František Vojtíšek (Czech Republic) Pavel Záleský	LIAZ	(Germany) Lutz Bernau (Germany) Egmont Bartmann (Germany) Andreas Kluge	Tatra
1989	Category not held					
1990	(Italy) Giorgio Villa (Italy) Giorgio Delfino (Italy) Claudio Vinante	Perlini	(France) Jacques Houssat (France) Thierry De Saulieu (Italy) Danilo Bottaro	Perlini	(Czech Republic) Zdeněk Kahánek (Czech Republic) Jaroslav Krpec (Czech Republic) Jiří Havlík	Tatra
1991	(France) Jacques Houssat (France) Thierry de Saulieu (Italy) Danilo Bottaro	Perlini	(Russia) Vladimir Goltsov (Russia) Firdaus Kabirov (Russia) Valery Koblukov	Kamaz	(Estonia) Joel Tammeka (Estonia) Juhan Anupõld (Estonia) Enno Piirsalu	Kamaz
1992	(Italy) Francesco Perlini (Italy) Giorgio Albiero (Italy) Claudio Vinante	Perlini	(France) Jacques Houssat (France) Thierry de Saulieu (Italy) Danilo Bottaro	Perlini	(Czech Republic) Karel Loprais (Czech Republic) Josef Kalina (Czech Republic) Radomír Stachura	Tatra
1993	(Italy) Francesco Perlini (Italy) Giorgio Albiero (Italy) Claudio Vinante	Perlini	(France) Jacques Houssat (France) Patrick Sarliève (Italy) Livio Diamante	Perlini	(France) Gilbert Versino (France) Raphaël Gimbre (Italy) Christian Versino	Mercedes-Benz
1994	(Czech Republic) Karel Loprais (Czech Republic) Radomír Stachura (Czech Republic) Josef Kalina	Tatra	(Japan) Yoshimasa Sugawara (Japan) Hideki Shibata	Hino	(France) Jacques Marvy (France) M. Pons (France) J.P. Dujon	Perlini
1995	(Czech Republic) Karel Loprais (Czech Republic) Radomír Stachura (Czech Republic) Josef Kalina	Tatra	(Japan) Yoshimasa Sugawara (Japan) Hideki Shibata	Hino	(Czech Republic) Vlastimil Buchtyár (Czech Republic) Milan Kořený (Czech Republic) Jaroslav Krpec	Tatra
1996	(Russia) Viktor Moskovskikh (Russia) Anatoly Kuzmin (Russia) Nail Bagavetdinov	Kamaz	(Czech Republic) Karel Loprais (Czech Republic) Tomáš Tomeček (Czech Republic) Radomír Stachura	Tatra	(Czech Republic) Ladislav Fajtl (Czech Republic) Jiří Janoušek (Czech Republic) František Wurst	Tatra
1997	(Austria) Peter Reif (Austria) Johann Deinhofer Roth	Hino	(Japan) Yoshimasa Sugawara (Japan) Naoko Matsumoto (Japan) Katsumi Hamura	Hino	(Belgium) Joseph Petit (France) Jean-Christophe Wagner (Japan) Takeshi Hashimoto	Hino
1998	(Czech Republic) Karel Loprais (Czech Republic) Radomír Stachura (Czech Republic) Jan Čermák	Tatra	(Japan) Yoshimasa Sugawara (Japan) Naoko Matsumoto (Japan) Takashi Ushioda	Hino	(Czech Republic) Milan Kořený (Czech Republic) Jaroslav Lamač (Czech Republic) Martin Kahánek	Tatra
1999	(Czech Republic) Karel Loprais (Czech Republic) Radomír Stachura (Czech Republic) Josef Kalina	Tatra	(Russia) Viktor Moskovskikh (Russia) Vladimir Chagin (Russia) Semen Yakubov	Kamaz	(Brazil) André de Azevedo (Czech Republic) Tomáš Tomeček (Brazil) Leilane Neubarth	Tatra
2000	(Russia) Vladimir Chagin (Russia) Semen Yakubov (Russia) Sergey Savostin	Kamaz	(Czech Republic) Karel Loprais (Czech Republic) Radomír Stachura (Czech Republic) Petr Gilar	Tatra	(Russia) Firdaus Kabirov (Russia) Aydar Belyaev (Russia) Vladimir Goloub	Kamaz
2001	(Czech Republic) Karel Loprais (Czech Republic) Josef Kalina (Czech Republic) Petr Hamerla	Tatra	(Japan) Yoshimasa Sugawara (Japan) Seiichi Suzuki (Japan) Teruhito Sugawara	Hino	(Austria) Peter Reif (Austria) Gunther Pichlbauer (Germany) Holger Hermann Roth	MAN
2002	(Russia) Vladimir Chagin (Russia) Semen Yakubov (Russia) Sergey Savostin	Kamaz	(Czech Republic) Karel Loprais (Czech Republic) Josef Kalina (Czech Republic) Petr Hamerla	Tatra	(Japan) Yoshimasa Sugawara (Japan) Naoko Matsumoto (Japan) Seiichi Suzuki	Hino
2003	(Russia) Vladimir Chagin (Russia) Semen Yakubov (Russia) Sergey Savostin	Kamaz	(Brazil) André de Azevedo (Czech Republic) Tomáš Tomeček (Czech Republic) Jaromír Martinec	Tatra	(Russia) Firdaus Kabirov (Russia) Aydar Belyaev (Russia) Ilgizar Mardeev	Kamaz
2004	(Russia) Vladimir Chagin (Russia) Semen Yakubov (Russia) Sergey Savostin	Kamaz	(Russia) Firdaus Kabirov (Russia) Aydar Belyaev (Russia) Dzhamil Kamalov	Kamaz	(Netherlands) Gerard de Rooy (Belgium) Tom Colsoul (Netherlands) Arno Slaats	DAF
2005	(Russia) Firdaus Kabirov (Russia) Aydar Belyaev (Russia) Andrey Mokeev	Kamaz	(Japan) Yoshimasa Sugawara (Japan) Katsumi Hamura	Hino	(Italy) Giacomo Vismara (Italy) Mario Cambiaghi (Italy) Claudio Bellina	Mercedes-Benz
2006	(Russia) Vladimir Chagin (Russia) Semen Yakubov (Russia) Sergey Savostin	Kamaz	(Netherlands) Hans Stacey (Belgium) Charly Gotlib (Netherlands) Bernard der Kinderen	MAN	(Russia) Firdaus Kabirov (Russia) Aydar Belyaev (Russia) Andrey Mokeev	Kamaz
2007	(Netherlands) Hans Stacey (Belgium) Charly Gotlib (Netherlands) Bernard der Kinderen	MAN	(Russia) Ilgizar Mardeev (Russia) Aydar Belyaev (Russia) Eduard Nikolaev	Kamaz	(Czech Republic) Aleš Loprais (Czech Republic) Petr Gilar	Tatra
2008	Cancelled					
2009	(Russia) Firdaus Kabirov (Russia) Aydar Belyaev (Russia) Andrey Mokeev	Kamaz	(Russia) Vladimir Chagin (Russia) Sergey Savostin (Russia) Eduard Nikolaev	Kamaz	(Netherlands) Gerard de Rooy (Belgium) Tom Colsoul (Netherlands) Marcel van Melis	GINAF
2010	(Russia) Vladimir Chagin (Russia) Sergey Savostin (Russia) Eduard Nikolaev	Kamaz	(Russia) Firdaus Kabirov (Russia) Aydar Belyaev (Russia) Andrey Mokeev	Kamaz	(Netherlands) Marcel van Vliet (Netherlands) Herman Vaanholt (Netherlands) Gerard van Veenendaal	GINAF
2011	(Russia) Vladimir Chagin (Russia) Sergey Savostin (Russia) Ildar Shaysultanov	Kamaz	(Russia) Firdaus Kabirov (Russia) Aydar Belyaev (Russia) Andrey Mokeev	Kamaz	(Russia) Eduard Nikolaev (Russia) Viatcheslav Mizyukaev (Russia) Vladimir Rybakov	Kamaz
2012	(Netherlands) Gerard de Rooy (Belgium) Tom Colsoul (Poland) Dariusz Rodewald	Iveco	(Netherlands) Hans Stacey (Netherlands) Hans van Goor (Netherlands) Bernard der Kinderen	Iveco	(Kazakhstan) Artur Ardavichus (Russia) Alexey Kuzmich (Kazakhstan) Nurlan Turlubaev	Kamaz
2013	(Russia) Eduard Nikolaev (Russia) Sergey Savostin (Russia) Vladimir Rybakov	Kamaz	(Russia) Airat Mardeev (Russia) Aydar Belyaev (Russia) Anton Mirniy	Kamaz	(Russia) Andrey Karginov (Russia) Andrey Mokeev (Russia) Igor Devyatkin	Kamaz
2014	(Russia) Andrey Karginov (Russia) Andrey Mokeev (Russia) Igor Devyatkin	Kamaz	(Netherlands) Gerard de Rooy (Belgium) Tom Colsoul (Netherlands) Darek Rodewald	Iveco	(Russia) Eduard Nikolaev (Russia) Sergey Savostin (Russia) Vladimir Rybakov	Kamaz
2015	(Russia) Airat Mardeev (Russia) Aydar Belyaev (Russia) Dmitriy Svistunov	Kamaz	(Russia) Eduard Nikolaev (Russia) Evgeny Yakovlev (Russia) Vladimir Rybakov	Kamaz	(Russia) Andrey Karginov (Russia) Andrey Mokeev (Russia) Igor Leonov	Kamaz
2016	(Netherlands) Gerard de Rooy (Spain) Moisès Torrallardona (Poland) Darek Rodewald	Iveco	(Russia) Airat Mardeev (Russia) Aydar Belyaev (Russia) Dmitriy Svistunov	Kamaz	(Argentina) Federico Villagra (Argentina) Jorge Pérez Companc (Argentina) Andrés Memi	Iveco
2017	(Russia) Eduard Nikolaev (Russia) Evgeny Yakovlev (Russia) Vladimir Rybakov	Kamaz	(Russia) Dmitry Sotnikov (Russia) Ruslan Akhmadeev (Russia) Igor Leonov	Kamaz	(Netherlands) Gerard de Rooy (Spain) Moisès Torrallardona (Poland) Darek Rodewald	Iveco
2018	(Russia) Eduard Nikolaev (Russia) Evgeny Yakovlev (Russia) Vladimir Rybakov	Kamaz	(Belarus) Siarhei Viazovich (Belarus) Pavel Haranin (Belarus) Andrei Zhyhulin	MAZ	(Russia) Airat Mardeev (Russia) Aydar Belyaev (Russia) Dmitriy Svistunov	Kamaz
2019	(Russia) Eduard Nikolaev (Russia) Evgeny Yakovlev (Russia) Vladimir Rybakov	Kamaz	(Russia) Dmitry Sotnikov (Russia) Dmitry Nikitin (Russia) Ilnur Mustafin	Kamaz	(Netherlands) Gerard de Rooy (Spain) Moisès Torrallardona (Poland) Darek Rodewald	Iveco
2020	(Russia) Andrey Karginov (Russia) Andrey Mokeev (Russia) Igor Leonov	Kamaz	(Russia) Anton Shibalov (Russia) Dmitry Nikitin (Russia) Ivan Tatarinov	Kamaz	(Belarus) Siarhei Viazovich (Belarus) Pavel Haranin (Belarus) Anton Zaparoshchanka	MAZ
2021	(Russia) Dmitry Sotnikov (Russia) Ruslan Akhamadeev (Russia) Ilgiz Akhmetzianov	Kamaz	(Russia) Anton Shibalov (Russia) Dmitri Nikitin (Russia) Ivan Tatarinov	Kamaz	(Russia) Airat Mardeev (Russia) Dmitry Svistunov (Russia) Akhmet Galiautdinov	Kamaz
2022	Dmitry Sotnikov; Ruslan Akhamadeev; Ilgiz Akhmetzianov	Kamaz	Eduard Nikolaev; Evgeny Yakovlev; Vladimir Rybakov	Kamaz	Anton Shibalov; Dmitri Nikitin; Ivan Tatarinov	Kamaz
2023	(Netherlands) Janus van Kasteren (Poland) Darek Rodewald (Netherlands) Marcel Snijders	Iveco	(Czech Republic) Martin Macík (Czech Republic) František Tomášek (Czech Republic) David Švanda	Iveco	(Netherlands) Martin van den Brink (Netherlands) Erik Kofman (Netherlands) Rijk Mouw	Iveco
2024	(Czech Republic) Martin Macík (Czech Republic) František Tomášek (Czech Republic) David Švanda	Iveco	(Czech Republic) Aleš Loprais (Czech Republic) Jaroslav Valtr Jr (Czech Republic) Jiří Stross	Praga	(Netherlands) Mitchel van den Brink (Netherlands) Jarno van de Pol (Spain) Moises Torrallardona	Iveco
2025	(Czech Republic) Martin Macík (Czech Republic) František Tomášek (Czech Republic) David Švanda	Iveco	(Netherlands) Mitchel van den Brink (Spain) Moises Torrallardona (Netherlands) Jarno van de Pol	Iveco	(Czech Republic) Aleš Loprais (Czech Republic) David Kripal (Poland) Darek Rodewald	Iveco
2026	(Lithuania) Vaidotas Žala (Portugal) Paulo Fiuza (Netherlands) Max Van Grol	Iveco	(Czech Republic) Aleš Loprais (Czech Republic) David Kripal (Czech Republic) Jiri Stross	Iveco	(Netherlands) Mitchel van den Brink (Netherlands) Bart Van Heun (Netherlands) Jarno van de Pol	Iveco

=== Quads ===
Year	1st		2nd		3rd	
Year	Rider	Quad	Rider	Quad	Rider	Quad
2009	(Czech Republic) Josef Macháček	Yamaha	(Argentina) Marcos Patronelli	Can-Am	(Poland) Rafał Sonik	Yamaha
2010	(Argentina) Marcos Patronelli	Yamaha	(Argentina) Alejandro Patronelli	Yamaha	(Spain) Juan Manuel González	Yamaha
2011	(Argentina) Alejandro Patronelli	Yamaha	(Argentina) Sebastián Halpern	Yamaha	(Poland) Łukasz Łaskawiec	Yamaha
2012	(Argentina) Alejandro Patronelli	Yamaha	(Argentina) Marcos Patronelli	Yamaha	(Argentina) Tomas Maffei	Yamaha
2013	(Argentina) Marcos Patronelli	Yamaha	(Chile) Ignacio Casale	Yamaha	(Poland) Rafał Sonik	Yamaha
2014	(Chile) Ignacio Casale	Yamaha	(Poland) Rafał Sonik	Yamaha	(Netherlands) Sebastian Husseini	Honda
2015	(Poland) Rafał Sonik	Yamaha	(Argentina) Jeremías González	Yamaha	(Bolivia) Walter Nosiglia	Honda
2016	(Argentina) Marcos Patronelli	Yamaha	(Argentina) Alejandro Patronelli	Yamaha	(South Africa) Brian Baragwanath	Yamaha
2017	(Russia) Sergey Karyakin	Yamaha	(Chile) Ignacio Casale	Yamaha	(Argentina) Pablo Copetti	Yamaha
2018	(Chile) Ignacio Casale	Yamaha	(Argentina) Nicolás Cavigliasso	Yamaha	(Argentina) Jeremías González	Yamaha
2019	(Argentina) Nicolás Cavigliasso	Yamaha	(Argentina) Jeremías González	Yamaha	(Argentina) Gustavo Gallego	Yamaha
2020	(Chile) Ignacio Casale	Yamaha	(France) Simon Vitse	Yamaha	(Poland) Rafał Sonik	Yamaha
2021	(Argentina) Manuel Andújar	Yamaha	(Chile) Giovanni Enrico	Yamaha	(United States) Pablo Copetti	Yamaha
2022	(France) Alexandre Giroud	Yamaha	(Argentina) Francisco Moreno	Yamaha	(Poland) Kamil Wiśniewski	Yamaha
2023	(France) Alexandre Giroud	Yamaha	(Argentina) Francisco Moreno Flores	Yamaha	(United States) Pablo Copetti	Yamaha
2024	(Argentina) Manuel Andújar	Yamaha	(France) Alexandre Giroud	Yamaha	(Slovakia) Juraj Varga	Yamaha

=== SSVs (UTVs until 2022) ===
Year	1st		2nd		3rd	
Year	Crew	UTV	Crew	UTV	Crew	UTV
2017	(Brazil) Leandro Torres (Brazil) Lourival Roldan	Polaris	(China) Wang Fujiang (China) Li Wei	Polaris	(Russia) Ravil Maganov (Russia) Kirill Shubin	Polaris
2018	(Brazil) Reinaldo Varela (Brazil) Gustavo Gugelmin	Can-Am	(France) Patrice Garrouste (Switzerland) Steven Griener	Polaris	(France) Claude Fournier (Poland) Szymon Gospodarczyk	Polaris
2019	(Chile) Francisco López Contardo (Chile) Alvaro Quintanilla	Can-Am	(Spain) Gerard Farrés (Spain) Daniel Oliveras	Can-Am	(Brazil) Reinaldo Varela (Brazil) Gustavo Gugelmin	Can-Am
2020	(United States) Casey Currie (United States) Sean Berriman	Can-Am	(Russia) Sergey Karyakin (Russia) Anton Vlasiuk	Can-Am	(Chile) Francisco López Contardo (Chile) Juan Pablo Latrach Vinagre	Can-Am
2021	(Chile) Francisco Lopez Contardo (Chile) Juan Pablo Latrach Vinagre	Can-Am	(United States) Austin Jones (Brazil) Gustavo Gugelmin	Can-Am	(Poland) Aron Domżała (Poland) Maciej Marton	Can-Am
2022	(United States) Austin Jones (Brazil) Gustavo Gugelmin	Can-Am	(Spain) Gerard Farrés (Spain) Diego Ortega Gil	Can-Am	(Lithuania) Rokas Baciuška (Spain) Oriol Mena	Can-Am
2023	(Poland) Eryk Goczał (Spain) Oriol Mena	Can-Am	(Lithuania) Rokas Baciuška (Spain) Oriol Vidal Montijano	Can-Am	(Poland) Marek Goczał (Poland) Maciej Marton	Can-Am
2024	(France) Xavier de Soultrait (France) Martin Bonnet	Polaris	(Switzerland) Jérôme de Sadeleer (France) Michaël Metge	Can-Am	(Saudi Arabia) Yasir Seaidan (France) Adrien Metge	Can-Am
2025	(United States) Brock Heger (United States) Max Eddy	Polaris	(Chile) Francisco López Contardo (Chile) Juan Pablo Latrach Vinagre	Can-Am	(Portugal) Alexandre Pinto (Portugal) Bernardo Oliveira	Can-Am
2026	(United States) Brock Heger (United States) Max Eddy	Polaris	(United States) Kyle Chaney (United States) Jacob Argubright	Can-Am	(France) Xavier de Soultrait (France) Martin Bonnet	Polaris

=== Light Prototypes (Challenger/T3) ===
Year	1st		2nd		3rd	
Year	Crew	Make	Crew	Make	Crew	Make
2021	(Czech Republic) Josef Macháček (Czech Republic) Pavel Vyoral	Can-Am	(Italy) Camelia Liparoti (Germany) Annett Fischer	Yamaha	(France) Philippe Pinchedez (France) Vincent Ferri	Pinch Racing
2022	(Chile) Francisco Lopez Contardo (Chile) Juan Pablo Latrach Vinagre	Can-Am	(Sweden) Sebastian Eriksson (Netherlands) Wouter Rosegaar	Can-Am	(Spain) Cristina Gutiérrez (France) Francois Cazalet	OT3
2023	(United States) Austin Jones (Brazil) Gustavo Gugelmin	Can-Am	(United States) Seth Quintero (Germany) Dennis Zenz	Can-Am	(Belgium) Guillaume De Mévius (France) François Cazalet	OT3
2024	(Spain) Cristina Gutiérrez (Spain) Pablo Moreno Huete	Taurus	(United States) Mitch Guthrie (United States) Kellon Walch	Taurus	(Lithuania) Rokas Baciuška (Spain) Oriol Vidal Montijano	Can-Am
2025	(Argentina) Nicolás Cavigliasso (Argentina) Valentina Pertegarini	Taurus	(Portugal) Gonçalo Guerreiro (Brazil) Cadu Sachs	Taurus	(Spain) Pau Navarro (Argentina) Lisandro Sisterna	Taurus
2026	(Spain) Pau Navarro (Spain) Jan Rosa	Taurus	(Saudi Arabia) Yasir Seaidan (France) Xavier Flick	Can-Am	(Argentina) Nicolás Cavigliasso (Argentina) Valentina Pertegarini	Taurus

=== Stock ===
Year	1st		2nd		3rd	
Year	Crew	Car	Crew	Car	Crew	Car
2026	(Lithuania) Rokas Baciuška	Defender Dakar D7X-R	(United States) Sara Price	Defender Dakar D7X-R	(France) Ronald Basso	Toyota Land Cruiser GR Sport

=== Classics ===
Year	1st		2nd		3rd	
Year	Crew	Make	Crew	Make	Crew	Make
2021	(France) Marc Douton (France) Emilien Etienne	Sunhill Buggy	(Spain) Juan Donatiu (Spain) Pere Serrat Puig	Mitsubishi Montero	(France) Lilian Harichoury (France) Luc Fertin (France) Laurent Correia	Renault Trucks
2022	(France) Serge Mogno (France) Florent Drulhon	Toyota Land Cruiser HDJ80	(France) Arnaud Euvrard (France) Adeline Euvrard	Mercedes ML	(Spain) Jesus Fuster Pliego (Spain) Juan Carlos Ramirez Moure	Mercedes G-320
2023	(Spain) Juan Morera (Spain) Lidia Ruba	Toyota Land Cruiser HDJ80	(Spain) Carlos Santaolalla (Spain) Aran Sol I Juanola	Toyota Land Cruiser HDJ80	(Italy) Paolo Bedeschi (Italy) Daniele Bottallo	Toyota Land Cruiser BJ71
2024	(Spain) Carlos Santaolalla (Spain) Aran Sol I Juanola	Toyota Land Cruiser HDJ80	(Italy) Lorenzo Traglio (Italy) Rudy Briani	Nissan Pathfinder	(Italy) Paolo Bedeschi (Italy) Daniele Bottallo	Toyota Land Cruiser BJ71
2025	(Spain) Carlos Santaolalla (Spain) Aran Sol I Juanola	Toyota Land Cruiser HDJ80	(Italy) Lorenzo Traglio (Italy) Rudy Briani	Nissan Terrano Pick-Up	(Lithuania) Karolis Raišys (Lithuania) Ignas Daunoravičius	Land-Rover Series III
2026	(Lithuania) Karolis Raišys (France) Christophe Marques	Land-Rover Series III	(Czech Republic) Ondřej Klymčiw (Czech Republic) Josef Broz	Mitsubishi Pajero	(Italy) Josef Unterholzner (Italy) Franco Gaioni	Mitsubishi Pajero

=== Mission 1000 ===
Year	1st		2nd		3rd	
Year	Crew	Make	Crew	Make	Crew	Make
2024	(Spain) Jordi Juvanteny (Spain) José Luis Criado (Spain) Xavier Ribas	MAN	(France) Jean-Michel Paulhe (France) Gauthier Gibert	Can-Am	(China) Wenmin Su	Arctic Leopard
2025	(Spain) Jordi Juvanteny (Spain) José Luis Criado (Spain) Xavier Ribas	MAN	(Japan) Yoshio Ikemachi (Portugal) Paulo Marques	HySE	(Argentina) Benjamin Pascual	Segway
2026	(Spain) Jordi Juvanteny (Spain) José Luis Criado (Spain) Xavier Ribas	MAN	(Spain) Fran Gómez Pallas	Arctic Leopard	(Argentina) Benjamin Pascual	Segway

== Television coverage ==
The rally is broadcast on television in more than 190 countries. A live feed of the event and a roundup of each day's race progress is made into a 26-minute programme. This has been commentated on by Toby Moody for ten years, and more recently by Neil Cole. Since 2024 the world feed has been commentated on by Andrew Smith, Jeremy Klayman, Jack Nicholls and Hannah Walker.

The rally organizers and their television crews provide 20 edit stations along the route for various countries to produce their own programmes about the rally. There are four TV helicopters, six stage cameras, and three bivouac crews to make over 1,000 hours of TV over the two-week period.

A 2006 television documentary Race to Dakar described the experiences of a team, including the English actor Charley Boorman, in preparation for and entry into the 2006 Dakar Rally.

=== Broadcasters ===
List of TV broadcasters as of 2022
Region	Country	TV Network
Western Europe	France	Franceinfo
Western Europe	France	France 2 / France 3 / France 4
Western Europe	Spain	La 1
Western Europe	Spain	Teledeporte
Western Europe	Spain	TV3
Western Europe	Spain	Esport3
Western Europe	Netherlands	RTL 4
Western Europe	Netherlands	RTL 7
Western Europe	Belgium	VTM
Western Europe		RTBF
Western Europe	Austria	ORF Sport +
Western Europe	Austria	ServusTV
Western Europe	Italy	Sport Mediaset it:Sport Mediaset
Western Europe	Italy	RAI
Western Europe	Italy	Sky Sport 24
Western Europe	Italy	Italia 1
Western Europe	Germany	ZDF
Central Europe	Poland	Polsat
Central Europe	Poland	TVP1 / TVP2 / TVN
Central Europe	Czech Republic	Nova
Central Europe	Czech Republic	Prima
Central Europe	Czech Republic	Czech TV
Central Europe	Slovakia	RTVS
Baltic Region	Estonia	TV6
Baltic Region	Lithuania	LNK
Europe	(European Union) Pan-Europe	Eurosport
Middle East	(N/A) Middle East	BeIN Sports
Middle East	Saudi Arabia	SSC sport
Latin America	(N/A) Pan-Latin America	ESPN
Americas	USA	MavTV
Americas	Canada	FloSports
Americas	Argentina	Canal 12 (Cordoba)
Americas	Argentina	America TV
Americas	Argentina	TPA
Americas	Argentina	C5N
Americas	Argentina	El Trece
Americas	Argentina	Telefe
Americas	Brazil	ESPN
Americas	Colombia	Caracol TV
Americas	Mexico	Fox Sports
Asia and Oceania	(N/A) Asia and Oceania	Eurosport Asia
Asia and Oceania	Australia	SBS
Asia and Oceania	New Zealand	Sky Sport
Asia and Oceania	China	Zhibo.tv
Asia and Oceania	Japan	J Sports
Asia and Oceania	India	1Sports
Africa	South Africa	SABC
Africa	South Africa	eNCA
Africa	(N/A) Africa	Supersoft
World	(N/A) World	Red Bull TV
World	(N/A) World	Motor Trend
World	(N/A) World	Motorsport.com
World	(N/A) World	France 24
World	(N/A) World	Canal 24 Horas
World	(N/A) World	Al Jazeera

== Video games ==
Release date	Title	Genre	Platform	Developer	Publisher
1988	Paris-Dakar Rally Special	Rally	Famicom	ISCO	CBS/Sony Group
1997	Dakar '97	Rally	PlayStation (console)	Elcom Co., Ltd.	Virgin Interactive Entertainment (Japan), Inc.
2001	Paris-Dakar Rally	Rally	Microsoft Windows, PlayStation 2	Broadsword Interactive	Acclaim Entertainment
2003	Dakar 2: The World's Ultimate Rally	Rally	PlayStation 2, Xbox, GameCube	Acclaim Studios Cheltenham	Acclaim Entertainment
2018	Dakar 18	Rally	Microsoft Windows, PlayStation 4, Xbox One	Bigmoon Entertainment	Deep Silver
2022	Dakar Desert Rally	Rally	Microsoft Windows, PlayStation 4, PlayStation 5, Xbox One, Xbox Series X/S	Saber Interactive	Saber Interactive

== Incidents ==
In 1982, Mark Thatcher, son of the then British Prime Minister Margaret Thatcher, along with his French co-driver Anny-Charlotte Verney and their mechanic, disappeared for six days. On 9 January, the trio became separated from a convoy of vehicles after they stopped to make repairs to a faulty steering arm. They were declared missing on 12 January. After a large-scale search was instigated, an Algerian military Lockheed L-100 (a version of the C-130 Hercules) search plane spotted their white Peugeot 504 some 50 kilometres (31 mi) off course. Thatcher, Verney, and the mechanic were all unharmed.

The organiser of the rally, Thierry Sabine, was killed when his Ecureuil helicopter ("Squirrel-copter") crashed at 7:30 p.m. on Tuesday 14 January 1986, into a dune at Mali during a sudden sand-storm. Also killed onboard was the singer-songwriter Daniel Balavoine, helicopter pilot François-Xavier Bagnoud, journalist Nathalie Odent, and Jean-Paul Lefur who was a radiophonic engineer for French radio broadcaster RTL (formerly Radio Luxembourg).

Six people were killed during the 1988 race, three participants and three local residents. In one incident, Baye Sibi, a 10-year-old Malian girl, was killed by a racer while she crossed a road. A film crew's vehicle killed a mother and daughter in Mauritania on the last day of the race. The race participants killed, in three separate crashes, were a Dutch navigator on the DAF Trucks team, a French privateer, and a French rider. Racers were also blamed for starting a wildfire that caused a panic on a train running between Dakar and Bamako, where three more people were killed.

In 2003, French driver Daniel Nebot both rolled and crashed his Toyota heavily at high speed killing his co-driver Bruno Cauvy.

In 2005, Spanish motorcyclist José Manuel Pérez died in a Spanish hospital on Monday 10 January after crashing the week before on the 7th stage. Italian motorcyclist Fabrizio Meoni, a two-time winner of the event, became the second Dakar Rally rider to die in two days, following Pérez on 11 January on stage 11. Meoni was the 11th motorcyclist and the 45th person overall to die in the history of the race. On 13 January a five-year-old Senegalese girl was hit and killed by a service lorry after wandering onto a main road, bringing the total deaths to five.

In 2006, 41-year-old Australian KTM motorcyclist Andy Caldecott, in his third time in the Dakar, died on 9 January as a result of neck injuries sustained in a crash approximately 250 kilometres (160 mi) into stage 9, between Nouakchott and Kiffa, only a few kilometers (miles) from the location where Meoni had his fatal wreck the year before. He won the third stage of the 2006 event between Nador and Er Rachidia only a few days before his death. The death occurred despite efforts by the event organisers to improve competitor safety, including limiting speed, mandatory rest at fuel stops, and reduced fuel tank capacity for the bike classes. On 13 January a 10-year-old boy died while crossing the course after being hit by a car driven by Latvian Māris Saukāns, while on 14 January a 12-year-old boy was killed after being hit by a support lorry.

In 2007, 29-year-old South African motor racer Elmer Symons died of injuries sustained in a crash during the fourth stage of the Rally. Symons crashed with his bike in the desert between Er Rachidia and Ouarzazate, Morocco. Another death occurred on 20 January, the night before the race's finish, when 42-year-old motorcyclist Eric Aubijoux died suddenly. The cause of death was initially believed to be a heart attack, but it was later suggested that Aubijoux had died of internal injuries sustained in a crash earlier that day while competing in the 14th stage of the race.

The 2008 Dakar Rally was cancelled due to security concerns after al-Qaeda's murder of four French tourists on Christmas Eve in December 2007 in Mauritania (a country in which the rally spent eight days), various accusations against the rally calling it "neo-colonialist", and al-Qaeda's accusations against Mauritania calling it a supporter of "crusaders, apostates and infidels". The French-based Amaury Sport Organisation in charge of the 6,000-kilometre (3,700 mi) rally said in a statement that they had been advised by the French government to cancel the race, which had been due to begin on 5 January 2008 from Lisbon. They said direct threats had also been made against the event by al-Qaeda related organisations.

Omar Osama bin Laden, the son of Osama bin Laden, attracted news coverage in 2008 by promoting himself as an "ambassador of peace" and proposing a 3,000-mile (4,800 km) horse race across North Africa as a replacement to the Dakar Rally, with sponsors' money going to support child victims of war, saying "I heard the rally was stopped because of al-Qaida. I don't think they are going to stop me."

On 7 January 2009, the body of 49-year-old motorcyclist Pascal Terry from France was found. He had been missing for three days and his body lay on a remote part of the second stage between Santa Rosa de la Pampa and Puerto Madryn.

On 4 January 2010, a woman watching the Dakar Rally was killed when a vehicle taking part in the race veered off the course and hit her during the opening stage.

On 1 January 2012, motorcyclist Jorge Andrés Martínez Boero of Argentina died after suffering a cardiac arrest after a fall. He was treated by medical staff within five minutes of the accident, but died on the way to hospital.

On 7 January 2015, motorcycle rider Michal Hernik died in unknown circumstances during Stage 3 of the 2015 rally.

On 12 January 2020, Portuguese motorcycle rider Paulo Gonçalves died after suffering a heart attack due to a crash on the seventh stage.

On 15 January 2021, motorcyclist Pierre Cherpin of France died. The 52-year-old Frenchman fell off his motorcycle on 10 January, and a rescue team in a helicopter found him unconscious in the desert. He was rushed to a hospital in Saudi Arabia where he was treated for his injuries. He sustained serious head injuries and cracked ribs, and one of his lungs also collapsed. Cherpin underwent emergency neurosurgery and was placed in an artificial coma. Doctors were initially optimistic about his recovery path and there were no complications after the surgery. He died during the medical transfer from Jeddah to France.

Overall, 76 people, including 31 competitors, have died in the Dakar Rally.

== Criticism ==
When the race was held in Africa, it was subject to criticism from several sources, generally focusing on the race's impact on the inhabitants of the African countries through which it passed. Some African residents along the race's course in previous years have said they saw limited benefits from the race; that race participants spent little money on the goods and services local residents can offer. The racers produced substantial amounts of dust along the course, and were blamed for hitting and killing livestock, in addition to occasionally injuring or killing people.

After the 1988 race, when three Africans were killed in collisions with vehicles involved in the race, PANA, a Dakar-based news agency, wrote that the deaths were "insignificant for the [race's] organisers". The Vatican City newspaper L'Osservatore Romano called the race a "vulgar display of power and wealth in places where men continue to die from hunger and thirst." During a 2002 protest at the race's start in Arras, France, a Green Party of France statement described the race as "colonialism that needs to be eradicated".

The rally was criticised before 2000 for crossing through the disputed territory of Western Sahara, which has been occupied by Morocco since 1975, without the approval of the Polisario Front independence movement, which considers itself the representative of the indigenous Sahrawi people. After the race officials gained formal permission from the Polisario from 2000 onwards this ceased to be an issue.

The environmental impact of the race has been another area of criticism. This criticism of the race is the topic of the song "500 connards sur la ligne de départ" ("500 Arseholes at the Starting Line"), on the 1991 album Marchand de cailloux by French singer Renaud. In 2014, the Dakar rally was criticized for damage done to archaeological sites in Chile.

The move to Saudi Arabia for the 2020 Dakar Rally was under heavy criticism because of the situation of human rights in Saudi Arabia and the position of women in that country. It is one of several allegations of the Saudi Arabian efforts at sportswashing that have been directed at the Saudi royal family. Despite the criticism from human rights organizations against the choice of host country for the 2020 season, the Dakar Rally was organized in Saudi Arabia for another consecutive year. The race organizers have defended their decision to maintain a partnership with Saudi Arabia amidst the criticism.

== See also ==
- Africa Eco Race – Rally raid launched in 2009 in response to the Dakar's move to South America
- Budapest-Bamako – Desert rally
- Silk Way Rally
- Rally dos Sertões
- Mint 400
- Rallye des Pharaons
- Peking to Paris
- Te Te rally
- Umi e, See You – A 1988 fictional Japanese film about the Dakar Rally
