= Volkswagen Race Touareg 3 =

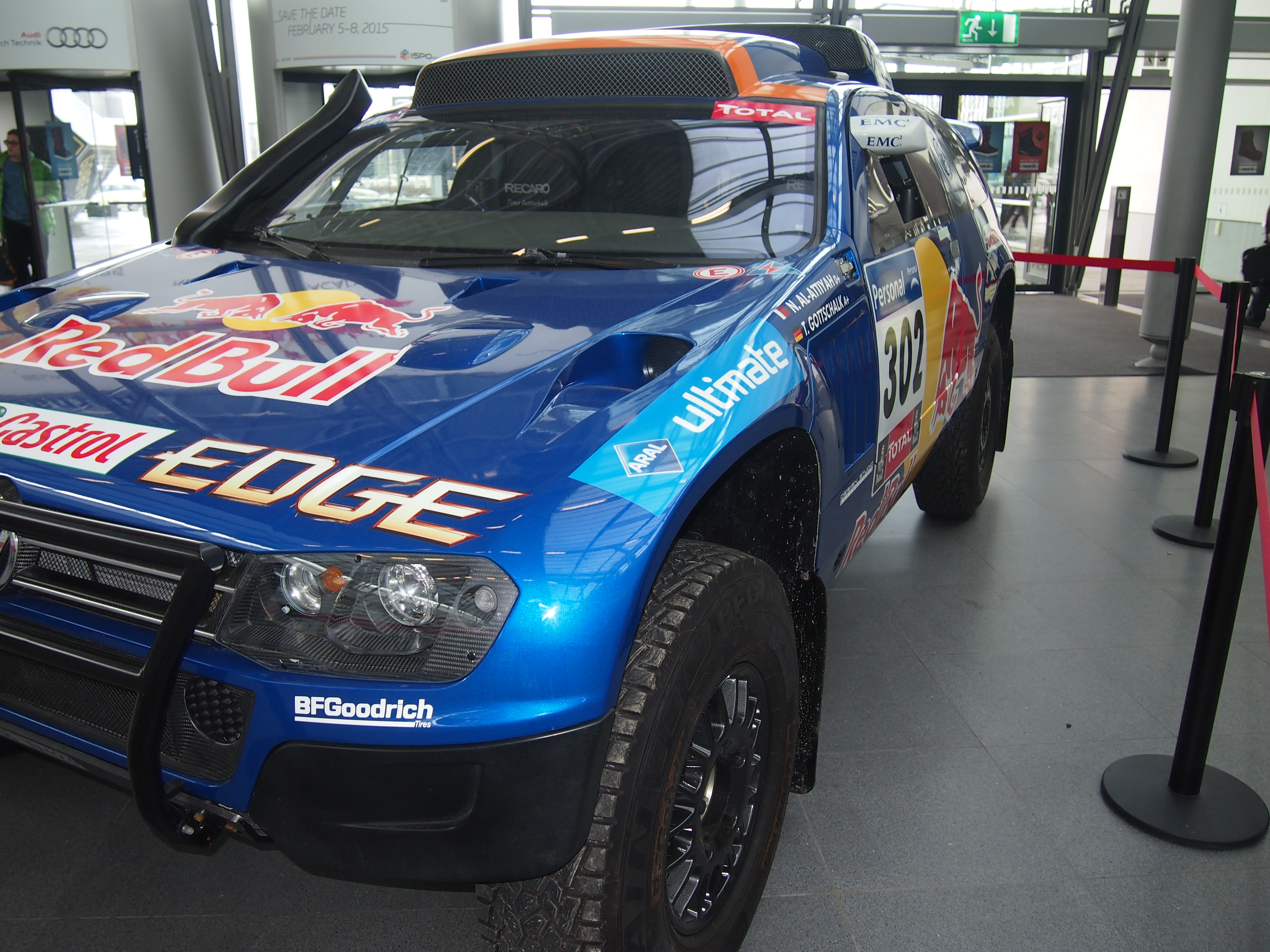

Overview
- Manufacturer: Volkswagen
- Production: 2010-2011

Body and chassis
- Class: Rally raid
- Layout: 4-wheel drive

Powertrain
- Engine: 2.5 L TDI twin-turbocharged (310 hp)
- Transmission: Five-speed sequential

Dimensions
- Curb weight: 1,788 kg

Chronology
- Predecessor: Volkswagen Race Touareg 2

The Volkswagen Race Touareg 3 was an off-road competition car specially designed to take part in the rally raids with the main objective of winning the Dakar Rally.

== Dakar victories ==
Year	Driver	Co-driver
2011	(Qatar) Nasser Al-Attiyah	(Germany) Timo Gottschalk

== See also ==
- Volkswagen Touareg
