= Jiří Moskal =

Jiří Moskal (born May 3, 1948 in Jablonec nad Nisou, Czechoslovakia) is a former Czech rally raid driver at the Dakar Rally in the truck category. He also won the 1981 Cup of Peace and Friendship.

== Dakar Rally results ==
Year	Class	Vehicle	Position	Stages won
1985	Trucks	(Czechoslovakia) LIAZ	13th	?
1986	Trucks	(Czechoslovakia) LIAZ	DNF	?
1987	Trucks	(Czechoslovakia) LIAZ	3rd	?
1988	Trucks	(Czechoslovakia) LIAZ	2nd	?
