= Climb Dance =

- Directed by: Jean Louis Mourey
- Starring: Ari Vatanen
- Distributed by: Automobiles Peugeot
- Release date: 1989
- Running time: 5 min.

Climb Dance is a cinéma vérité short film, which features Finnish rally driver Ari Vatanen setting a record time in the highly modified four-wheel drive, all-wheel steering Peugeot 405 Turbo 16 at the 1988 Pikes Peak International Hillclimb in Colorado, United States. The film was produced by Peugeot and directed by Jean Louis Mourey. The record time set was 10:47.77.

In 2013, Peugeot commissioned a remastered HD version of the film in celebration of their entry in the 2013 Pikes Peak International Hill Climb with multiple WRC champion Sébastien Loeb.

== Awards ==
- Grand Prix Du Film in Festival De Chamonix, 1990
- Silver Screen at US Industrial Film & Video Festival Chicago, 1990
- Prix Special Du Jury at the Festival International Du Film D'Aventure Val D´Isere, 1990
- Golden Award at the International Film Festival Houston, 1990
