= Peugeot 405 Turbo 16 =

Racing car by Peugeot Talbot Sport

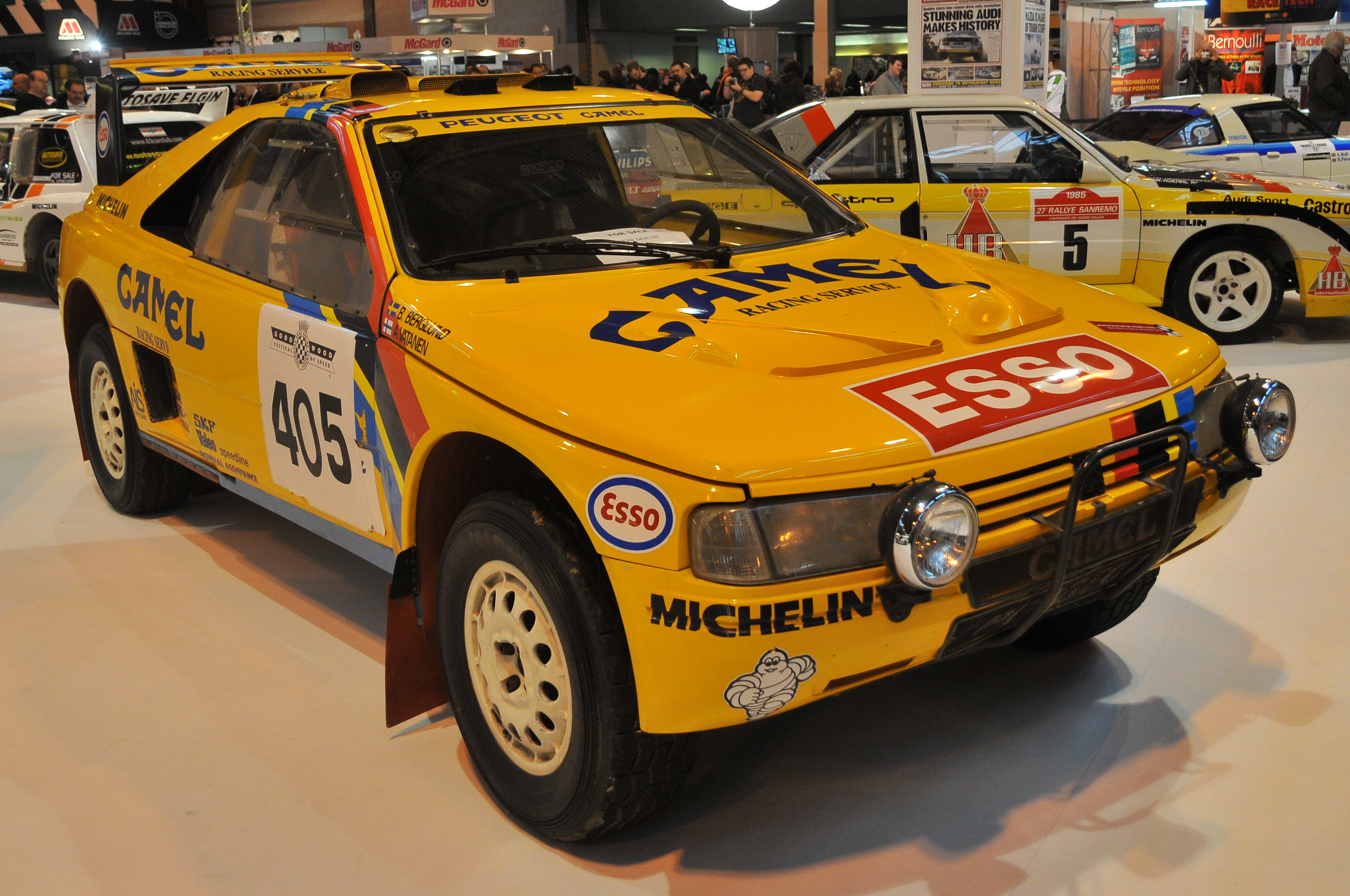

Overview
- Manufacturer: Peugeot
- Production: 1988–1990
- Designer: André de Cortanze

Powertrain
- Engine: 1.9 L Mid-engine turbo DOHC I4

Chronology
- Predecessor: Peugeot 205 Turbo 16
- Successor: Citroën ZX Rallye-raid

The Peugeot 405 Turbo 16 is a coupé derived from the Peugeot 405 and the Peugeot 205 Turbo 16, built by Peugeot Talbot Sport for African rally raids in 1988. Driven by Ari Vatanen, the four wheel drive car won the Paris Dakar rally in 1989 and 1990. It won the Pikes Peak International Hill Climb in 1988 setting a record-breaking time of 10 minutes and 47 seconds in the hands of Vatanen. Footage from Vatanen's run was used to create the short film Climb Dance.

It had four wheel steering, a feature never before seen on a rally or hillclimb car. The engine sat very low in front of the right rear wheel with the turbocharger on the opposite side. It had a very good power-to-weight ratio with more than 600 horsepower for a car weighing barely 900 kilograms and could accelerate from zero to 200 km/h (124 mph) in less than 10 seconds. The car was backed by a $1 million-plus budget from Peugeot.

== Gallery ==
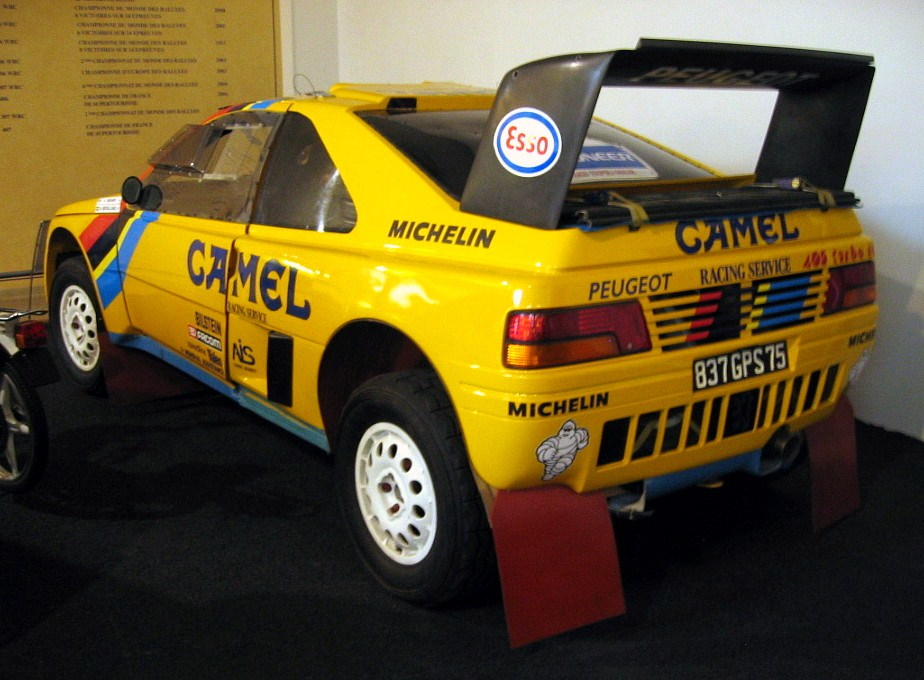
Peugeot 405 Turbo 16 rear

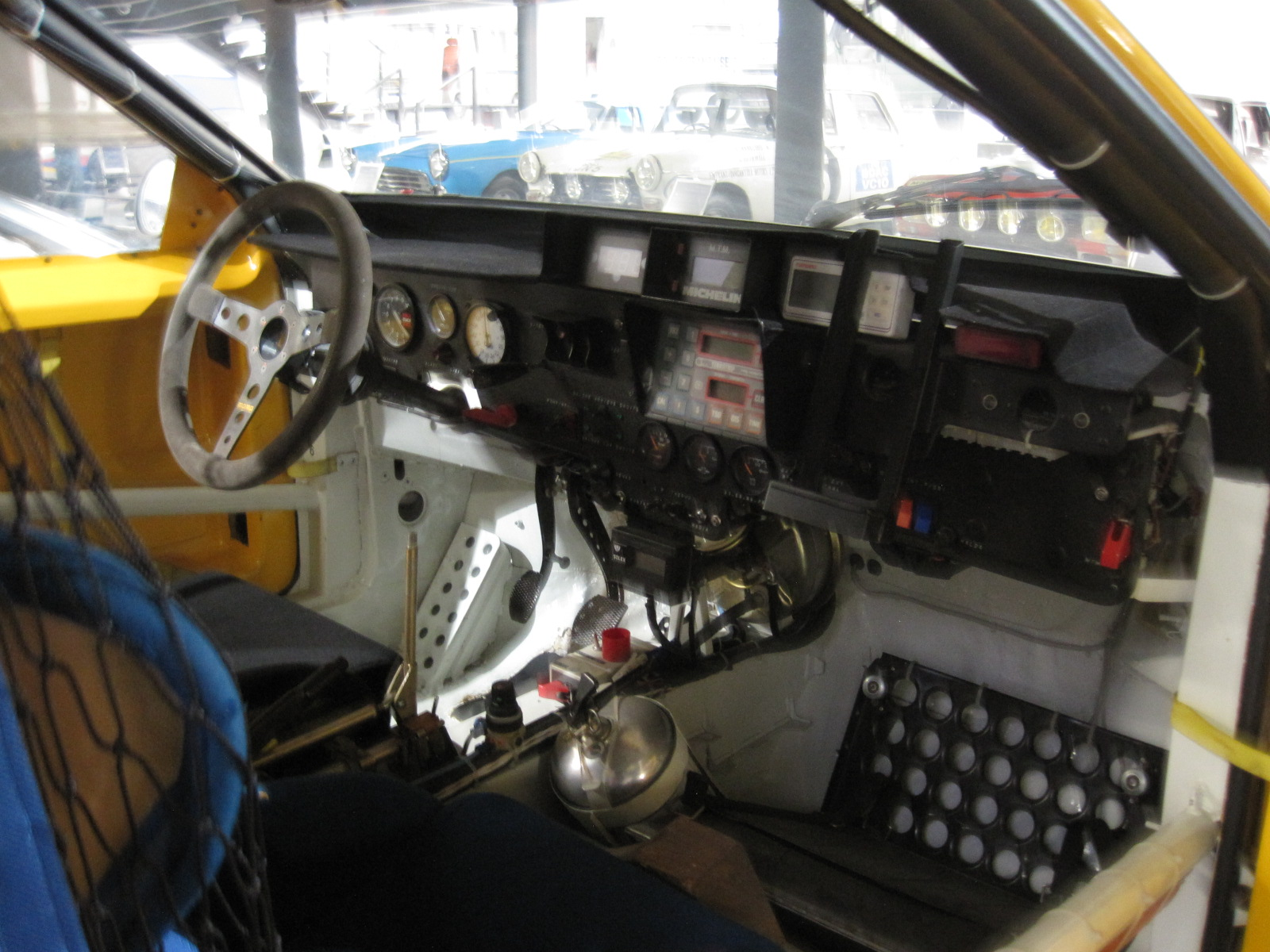
Interior

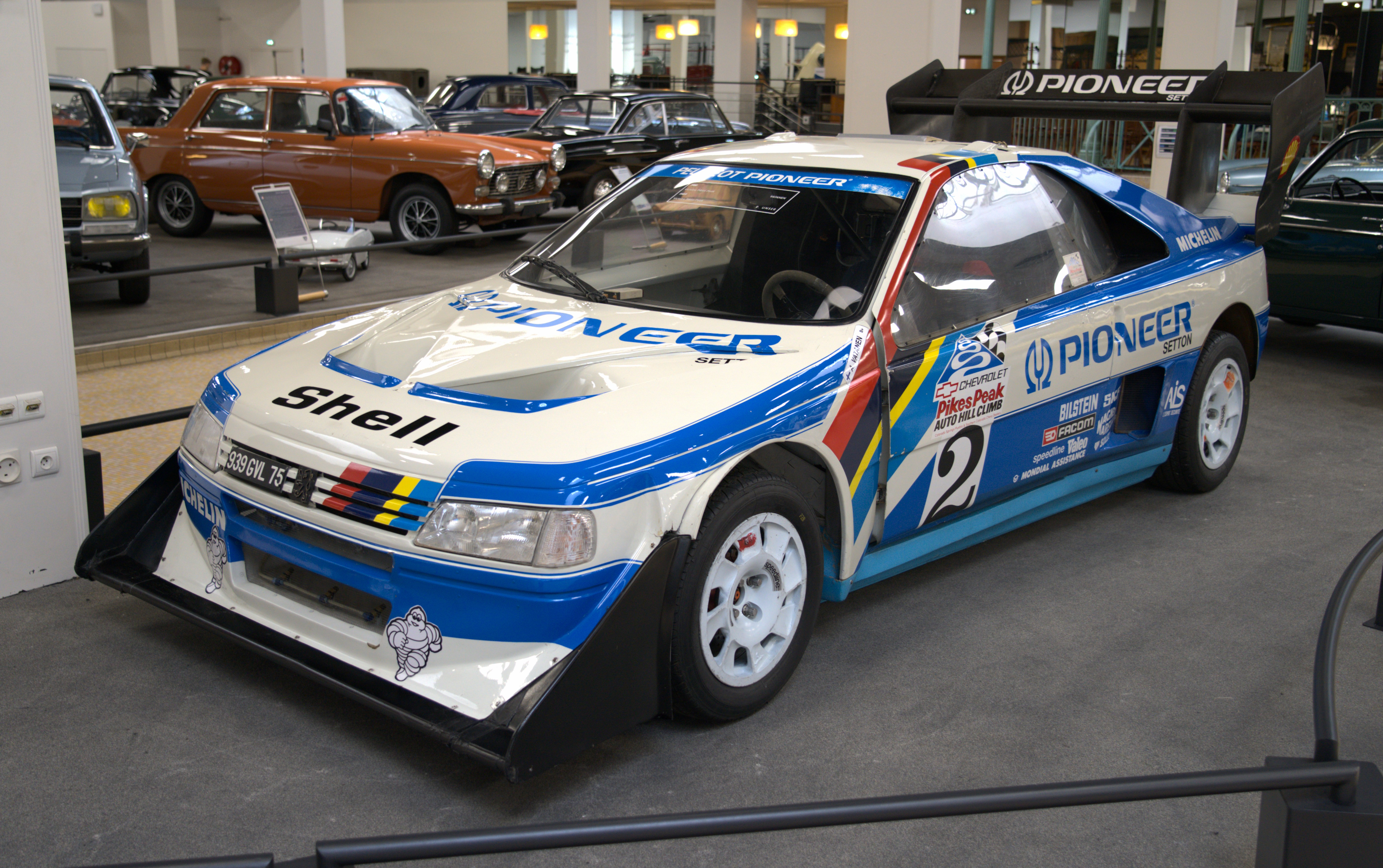
Peugeot 405 Turbo 16 Pikes Peak

== See also ==
- Peugeot 205 Turbo 16
- Peugeot 405
