= Honda EXP-2 =

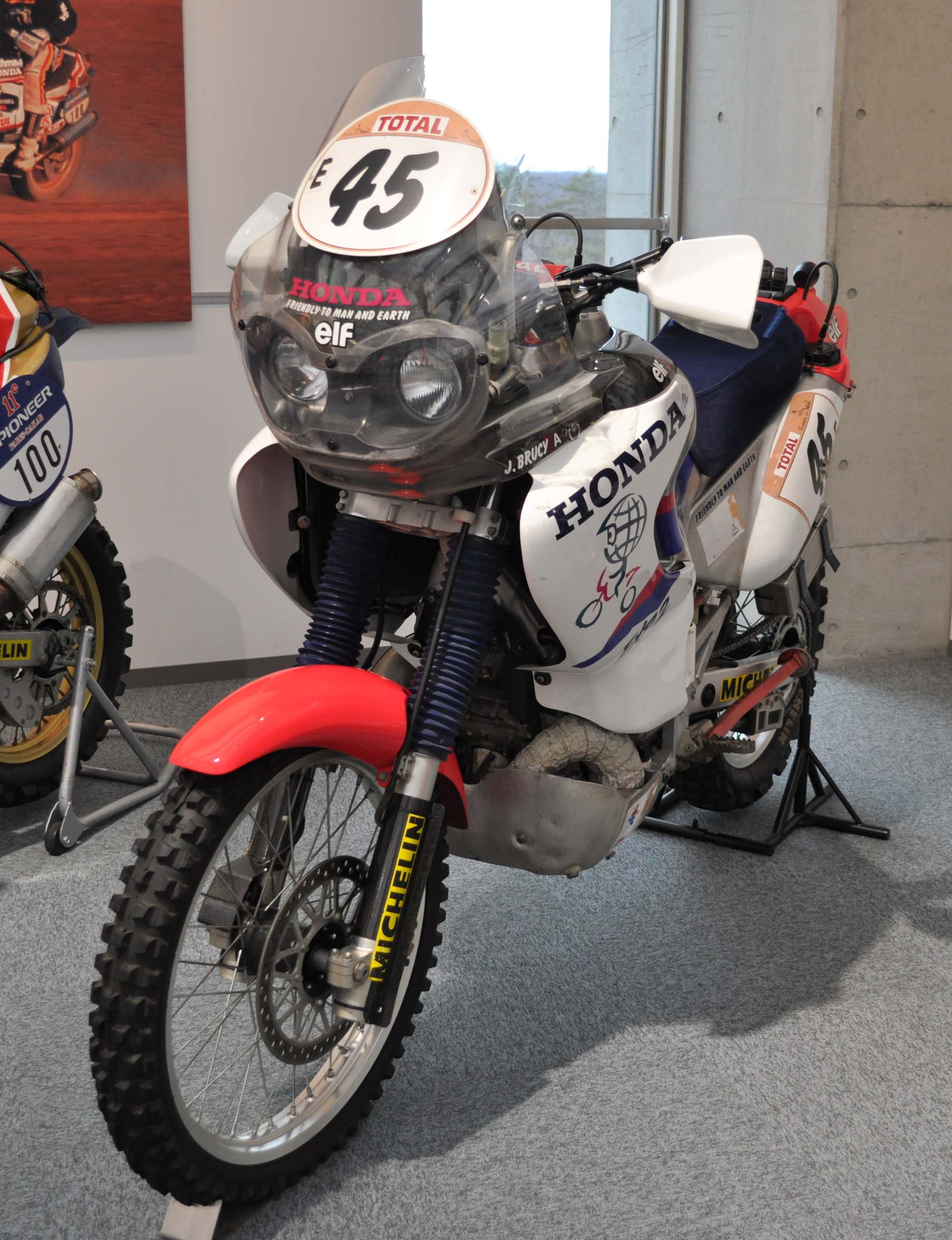
Honda EXP-2

The Honda EXP-2 was an off-road experimental prototype motorcycle, designed in 1995, with a fuel injected 400 cc (24 cu in) two-stroke engine. It was intended to serve global markets that still relied heavily on two-stroke technology, but to comply with increasingly strict emissions laws.

== Technology ==
With the utilization of a redesigned exhaust port valve and the ARC (Activated Radical Combustion) system engaged, the engine would produce a pre-ignited combustion effect at low throttle that would completely burn all fuel in the chamber compared to how a conventional two-stroke engine would lose part of the intake charge. The result decreased two major drawbacks of two-stroke technology of both incomplete combustion of fuel at low engine revolutions (RPM) and expulsion of unburned fuel at high RPM.
