= 1979 Paris–Dakar Rally =

Off-road motorsport event in France and Africa

1979 Dakar Rally
Next event →
- The route
- Host country: France; Algeria; Niger; Mali; Senegal

Results
- Cars winner: (France) Alain Génestier; Range Rover
- Bikes winner: (France) Cyril Neveu; Yamaha XT500

1979 Dakar Rally, also known as the 1979 Paris–Alger–Dakar Rally, was the first running of the Dakar Rally event. The rally began on 26 December 1978 from Paris, France and finished on 14 January 1979 in Dakar, Senegal, interrupted by a transfer across the Mediterranean. Cyril Neveu won the motorcycle category on a Yamaha, while the car category was won by Alain Génestier in a Range Rover.

== Summary ==
A total of 182 competitors (80 cars, 90 motorcycles and 12 trucks) contested the inaugural Paris-Dakar Rally, departing the Place du Trocadéro on Boxing Day 1978 to embark upon a 10,000 kilometre journey to the Senegalese capital of Dakar via Algeria, Niger, Mali and Upper Volta. All the vehicles that took part were classified together, although they would compete separately in subsequent editions of the race.

Cyril Neveu won the rally aboard a Yamaha despite not winning any individual stages, taking the lead on the sixth stage after Patrick Schaal (Yamaha) fell and fractured his little finger. Jean-Claude Morellet, competing under the alias of "Fenouil", had been running second until he was forced to retire as his BMW suffered engine failure with less than 200 km of the rally left to run. That promoted Gilles Comte (Yamaha) to second and Philippe Vassard (Honda), the only competitor to complete the Bamako-Nioro stage in the originally allotted time before it was extended, to third.

Alain Génestier's Range Rover was the best of the cars in fourth, ahead of the Renault 4 of the Marreau brothers. Neveu's brother Christophe had led early on in the rally after winning two of the first three stages in his Range Rover, but got lost on the stage between Arlit and Agadez along with around a quarter of the remaining competitors.

== Entry list ==
=== Number of entries ===
Stage	Bikes	Cars	Trucks	Total
Start of Rally	90	80	12	182
End of Rally	34	37	3	74

=== Competitor list ===
Entry list — Bikes

No.	Driver	Bike
1	(France) Corinne Koppenhague	Suzuki SP 370
2	(France) Gilles Comte	Yamaha XT 500
3	(France) Christian Rayer	Yamaha XT 500
4	(France) Rudy Potisek	Yamaha XT 500
5	(France) Jean-Claude Olivier	Yamaha XT 500
6	(France) Jean-Claude Morellet aka 'Fenouil'	BMW 800 GS
7	(France) Dominique Martin	Yamaha XT 500
8	(France) Patrick Schaal	Yamaha XT 500
9	(France) Dominique Sauvetre	Yamaha XT 500
10	(France) Thierry Pascault	Yamaha XT 500
11	(France) Yves Bon	Yamaha XT 500
12	(France) Cyril Neveu	Yamaha XT 500
13	(France) Patrick Beaufront	Yamaha XT 500
14	(France) Yannick Le Guyader	Yamaha XT 500
15	(France) Christian Desnoyer	Honda XL 250S
16	(France) Jean-pierre Dos Reis	Honda XL 250S
17	(France) Patrice Taravella	Honda XL 250S
18	(France) Pierre Mengue	Yamaha XT 500
19	(France) Grégoire Verhaeghe	Honda XL 125S
20	(France) Patrick Harmand	Honda XL 250S
21	(France) Bernard Neimer	Honda XL 250S
22	(France) Bruno Dusi	Honda XL 250S
23	(France) Philippe Vassard	Honda XL 250S
24	(France) Jean-louis Despagne	Yamaha XT 500
25	(France) Bernard Mora	Yamaha XT 500
26	(France) Henri Gabrelle	Honda XL 250S
27	(France) Gilles Desheulles	Honda XL 250S
28	(France) Max Commençal	Yamaha XT 500
29	(France) Marie Ertaud	Yamaha XT 500
30	(France) Michel Montange	Honda XL 250S
31	(Switzerland) Willi Steiner	Yamaha XT 500
32	(France) Bruno Vecchioni	Honda XL 250S
33	(France) Alain Quie	Honda XL 125S
34	(France) Bernard Atanne	Honda XL 250S
35	(France) Olivier Kirkpatrick	Yamaha XT 500
36	(France) Bruno Dubois-Trabuc	Yamaha XT 500
39	(France) Christian Paul	Honda XL 250S
40	(France) Jean Vaneste	Yamaha XT 500
41	(France) Martine de Cortanze	Honda XL 250S
42	(France) Pascale Geurie	Honda XL 250S
43	(France) Christine Martin	Honda XL 250S
44	(France) Marie-Dominique Cousin	Yamaha XT 500
45	(France) Pierre David	MZ 250
46	(France) Jean-Noël Castanet	Honda XL 250S
47	(France) Daniel Piton	Kawasaki KL 250
48	(France) Jacques Micallef	Yamaha XT 500
49	(France) Luc Offenstein	Yamaha XT 500
50	(France) Michel Poncet	Honda XL 250S
51	(France) Pierre Banino	Yamaha XT 500
52	(France) Alain Schaecht	Honda XL 250S
53	(France) Pierre Schricke	Suzuki TS125
54	(France) Bernard Gautier	Honda XL 250S
55	(France) Alain Martin	Honda XL 250S
56	(France) Eric Malot	Yamaha XT 500
57	(France) Thierry Roghe	Honda XL 250S
58	(France) Eric Popineau	Honda XL 250S
59	(France) Michel Razet	Honda XL 250S
60	(France) Jean-Pierre Tonnelline	Honda XL 250S
61	(France) Paul-Eric Allard	Suzuki TS125
62	(France) Alain Vial	Suzuki SP 370
64	(France) Laurent Gomis	Suzuki SP 370
65	(France) Hubert Auriol	Yamaha XT 500
66	(France) Philippe Jambert	BMW R65
67	(France) Jean-François Chanéac	Honda XL 250S
68	(France) Didier Boucher	Yamaha XT 500
69	(France) Alain Gaeremynck	Suzuki SP 370
70	(Belgium) Alain Padou	Honda XL 250S
71	(France) Yannik Lenglet	Honda XL 250S
72	(France) Guy Leconte	Yamaha XT 500
73	(France) Jacques Maitrot	Honda XL 250S
74	(France) Guy Albaret	Yamaha XT 500
75	(France) Patrick Meziani	Yamaha XT 500
76	(France) Pierre Berty	Yamaha XT 500
77	(France) Jean-pierre Pachoud	Yamaha XT 500
78	(France) Patrice Dodin	Yamaha XT 500
79	(France) Patrick Debuire	Yamaha XT 500
81	(France) Serge Dumolin	Yamaha XT 500
82	(France) Lionel Rousseau	Yamaha XT 500
83	(France) Bernard Rigoni	Guzzi TT 500
84	(France) Alain Piatek	Guzzi TT 500
85	(France) Alain Legrand	Guzzi TT 500
86	(France) Eric Breton	Guzzi TT 500
88	(France) Martine Renier	Guzzi TT 500
94	(France) Alain Bard	Yamaha XT 500

Entry list — Cars/Trucks

No.	Driver	Co-driver	Co-driver 2/Technician	Vehicle
100	(Monaco) Hubert Rigal	(France) Dominique Rochette	-	Range Rover V8
101	(France) Maurice Calamel	(France) Michel Calamel	-	Land Rover
102	(France) Bernard Hervier	(France) Christian Caillon	-	Range Rover V8
103	(France) Daniel Nollan	(France) Philippe Hayat	(France) Jean-Pierre Domblides	Renault KZ
104	(France) Jean-François Piot	(France) Pierre Raux	(France) Jean-Pierre Boulme	Toyota BJ
105	(France) Bernard Maingret	(France) Christian Maingret	-	Mercedes-Benz Unimog
106	(France) Max Hugueny	(France) Bernard Trévidic	-	Toyota Diesel
107	(France) Christian Duboscq	(France) Pierre-Emmanuel Froissart	-	Lada Niva
108	(France) Gérard Mair	(France) Georges Vanelslande	-	Ford Transit
109	(France) Stéphan Bosteels	(France) Stéphane Bosteels	-	Citroën GS
110	(France) François Forestier	(France) Philippe Meneau	-	Toyota BJ
111	(France) Pierre Dagoury	(France) Bertrand Tournier	-	Lada Niva
112	(France) Claude Neveu	(France) Gary Carrera	(France) Gilles Maurice	Toyota BJ
113	(France) Jean-Michel Bordais	(France) Marcel Quie	-	Range Rover V8
114	(France) Philippe Leroux	(France) Gilbert Pozzo di Borgo	-	Toyota BJ
115	(France) Jean-Louis Figureau	(France) Jean-Paul Ydraut	-	Peugeot 504
116	(France) André Piguet	(France) Philippe D'Agostino	(France) François Jacquin	Citroën DS
117	(France) Bernard Lemonnier	(France) Jacqueline Lemonnier	-	Toyota Diesel
118	(France) Pierre Chamagne	(France) Raymond Thérage	-	Peugeot 504
119	(France) Philippe Tiercin	(France) Michel Gadeaud	-	Citroën CX
120	(France) Christophe Neveu	(France) Gilles Gaignault	-	Range Rover V8
121	(France) Michel Delannoy	(France) Frédéric Harrewyn	-	Toyota Diesel
122	(Switzerland) Enrico Paci	Unknown	-	Jeep Wagoneer
123	(Belgium) Edi-Paul Heinis	(Belgium) Pierre Heinis	-	Volkswagen 1300
124	(France) François Jacquet	Unknown	-	Land Rover
125	(France) Guy Chambily	(France) Michel Desaunay	-	Toyota BJ
126	(France) Claude Renault	(France) Jacques Cholet	-	Lada Niva
127	(France) Pierre Bouille	(France) Gilles Morel	-	Renault 5
128	(France) Chantal Comte	(France) Christiane van Ryswyck	-	Volkswagen 181
129	(France) Yves Sunhill	(France) Jean-Paul Sevin	-	Buggy Sunhill
130	(France) Pierre-Louis Moreau	(France) Jean-Yves Touya	-	Peugeot 504
131	(France) Claude Marreau	(France) Bernard Marreau	-	Renault 4 Sinpar
132	(France) Pierre Minonzio	(France) Jean-Louis Ledentu	-	Lada Niva
133	(France) Henri Mouren	(France) Henri Braquet	-	Toyota BJ
134	(France) Alain Vandekerkhove	(France) Daniel Pichot	(France) Gérard Dutertry	Toyota BJ
135	(France) Dominique Fougerouse	(Belgium) Christine Beckers	(France) Marguerite Ondarts	Toyota BJ
136	(France) Pierre Fougerouse	(France) Anne-Marie de Belabre	-	Toyota BJ
137	(France) Patrick Barbier	(France) Jean-Louis Dieude	(France) Michel Hardy	Range Rover V8
138	(France) Gérard Sarrazin	(France) Lucette Sarrazin	-	Range Rover V8
139	(France) Philippe Catel	(France) Anne Catel	-	Range Rover V8
140	(Italy) Agostino Tocci	(Italy) Carlo Fucci	-	Fiat Campagnola
141	(Italy) Tommaso Carletti	(Italy) Amarilli Carletti	-	Fiat Campagnola
142	(Italy) Franco Arbizzi	(Italy) Giovanni Crappolo	-	Fiat Campagnola
143	(Italy) Cesare Giraudo	(Italy) Antonio Cavalleri	(Italy) Mario Cavalleri	Fiat Campagnola
144	Unknown	Unknown	Unknown	Unknown
145	Unknown	Unknown	Unknown	Fiat Campagnola
146	Unknown	Unknown	Unknown	Unknown
147	Unknown	Unknown	Unknown	Unknown
148	(France) Françoise Rayer	(France) Chantal Gauche	-	Lada Niva
149	(France) Jacky Leguy	(France) Michel Beaujean	-	Mercedes-Benz Unimog
150	(France) Jean-Jacques Ratet	(France) Robert Ignazi	-	Toyota BJ
151	(France) Jean-Claude Leclerc	(France) Christian Crye	-	Toyota BJ
152	(Belgium) Franz Deladriere	(Belgium) Pierre Deghaye	(Belgium) Françoise Deghaye	Mercedes-Benz Unimog
153	(Belgium) Guy Deladriere	(France) Franz Deladriere	-	Buggy Strakit
155	(France) Marcel Hugueny	(France) Patrick Chapuis	-	Toyota BJ
156	(France) Jacky Privé	(France) Reynald Privé	-	Range Rover V8
157	(France) Dominique Fondrillon	(France) Marcel Schaecht	-	Toyota BJ
158	(France) Frédéric Gayet	(France) Annie Benard	-	Buggy
159	(France) Michel Etchepar	(France) Gérard Loupias	-	Mercedes-Benz Unimog
160	(France) Francis Humblot	(France) Jean-Claude Lombard	-	Toyota BJ
161	(France) Laurent Bacholle	(France) Canut	-	Toyota BJ
162	(France) Alain Génestier	(France) Joseph Terbiaut	(France) Jean Lemordant	Range Rover V8
163	(France) Jean-François Sausset	(France) Pierre Le Monnier	-	Renault 4
164	(France) Olivier Turcat	(France) Dominique de Araujo	-	Cournil
165	(France) Marc André	(France) Philippe Puyfoulhoux	-	Peugeot 404 Plateu
166	(France) Jean Dominique Clément	(France) Anne Clément	-	Land Rover
167	(France) Christian Sandron	(France) Philippe Alberto	-	Citroën Dyane
168	(France) René Metge	(France) Claude Barbier	-	Range Rover V8
169	(France) Georges Houel	(France) Christian Pouchelon	-	Renault 30
170	(France) Gil Guillot	(France) Patrice Pradeau	-	Cournil
171	(France) Philippe Chapel	(France) Sannier	(France) Yves Belleville	Range Rover V8
172	(France) Jean-Pierre Kurrer	(France) Jean-Claude Henriet	-	Cournil
173	(France) Gérard Dorangeon	(France) Bernard Preschey	-	Renault 5
174	(France) Michel Puren	(France) Pierre Dumas	-	Range Rover V8
175	(France) René Banino	(France) Henri Legourriérec	-	Toyota BJ
176	(France) Claude Sezalory	(France) Diven Casarini	(France) De Frémont	Toyota BJ
177	(France) Eric Vuillemin	(France) Daniel Adrian	-	Peugeot 404 Plateu
178	(France) Dominique Bertrand	(France) Thierry De Saulieu	(France) Claude Prévost	Fiat Campagnola
179	(France) Christian De Cortanze	(France) Pierre Rigal	-	Fiat Campagnola
180	(France) Jean-François Dunac	(France) François Beau	(France) Jean-Pierre Chapel	Pinzgauer 6X6
181	(France) Michel Pignot	(France) Jean-Claude Marie	-	Saviem SM8
182	(France) Max Meynier	(France) Francis Zegut	(France) Christian Boudas	Toyota FJ40
183	(France) Philippe Hrouda	(France) Marie-Josée Perez	(France) Nicole Chastenet	Peugeot 504 Break
184	(France) Jacky Haas	(France) Elisabeth Trebuchet	(France) Henri Poulain	Renault 12 Break
185	(France) Gérard Bouvier	(France) Gérard Ceolin	(France) Odile Rosanval	Peugeot 504 Break
186	(France) Guy Dreumont	(France) Serge Rafal	-	Peugeot 504 Break
187	(France) Alain Mekki	(France) Jean Neault	-	Unic
188	(France) Joseph De Quecker	(France) Jean-Pierre Dufour	(France) François-Xavier Beaudet	Toyota BJ
189	(France) Christian Rodier	(France) Bourdex	(France) Fabre	Mercedes-Benz Unimog
190	(France) Bernard Guengant	(France) Christian van Ryswyck	(France) Gabriel Sivaly	Range Rover V8
191	(France) Michel van Gorp	(France) Dominique Pipat	-	Toyota BJ
192	(France) Daniel Petit	(France) Françis Mare	-	Unic
193	(France) Christian Lacombe	(France) Catherine de Mesmaeker	(France) Georges Renou	Toyota BJ
194	(France) Benoît Chavane	(France) Alain Corroler	-	Talbot Rancho
195	(France) William Mazoyer	Unknown	-	Saviem TP3
196	(France) Pierre Devaux	(France) Jean-Louis Malvoisin	(France) Roland Digaldi	Unic
199	Unknown	Meppiel	Jardin	Mercedes-Benz
200	(France) Thierry Sabine	(France) Daniel Lentaigne	-	Toyota BJ

== Stages ==
Stage	Date	From	To	Dist.	Winner (cars)	Winner (bikes)
1	26 December 1978	(France) Paris	(France) Montlhéry	3.6	(France) C. Neveu	(France) C. Desnoyers
1	27 December 1978	(France) Montlhéry	(France) Marseille		Liaison only	
—N/a	28–30 December 1978	Transportation to Africa				
2	31 December 1978	(Algeria) Algiers	(Algeria) Reggane		Liaison only	
2	1 January 1979	(Algeria) Reggane	(Algeria) In Salah	270	(France) J. Privé	(France) C. Rayer
2	2 January 1979	(Algeria) In Salah	(Algeria) Tamanrasset		Liaison only	
3	3 January 1979	(Algeria) Tamanrasset	(Algeria) In Guezzam	373	(France) C. Neveu	(France) R. Potisek
3	4 January 1979	(Niger) Assamaka	(Niger) Arlit	230	(France) G. Daurangeon	(France) P. Schaal
3	5 January 1979	(Niger) Arlit	(Niger) Agadez	231	(France) P-L. Moreau	(France) J-C. Olivier
4	6 January 1979	(Niger) Agadez	(Niger) Niamey	230	(France) C. Marreau	(France) J-C. Olivier
5	7 January 1979	(Niger) Niamey	(Mali) Gao	448	Stage cancelled	
—N/a	8 January 1979	(Mali) Gao		—N/a	Rest day	
6	9 January 1979	(Mali) Gao	(Mali) Mopti	600	(France) A. Génestier	(France) G. Comte
6	10 January 1979	(Mali) Mopti	(Mali) Bamako		Liaison only	
7	11 January 1979	(Mali) Bamako	(Mali) Nioro du Sahel	417	(Italy) C. Giraudo	(France) P. Vassard
8	12 January 1979	(Mali) Nioro du Sahel	(Mali) Kayes	270	None declared	(France) C. Rayer
8	13 January 1979	(Mali) Kayes	(Senegal) Bakel		Liaison only	
8	14 January 1979	(Senegal) Bakel	(Senegal) Dakar	96	(Monaco) H. Rigal	(France) G. Comte

- The above distances (in kilometres) refer only to the competitive timed part of the stage, which make up 3,168 km.

== Results ==
Final standings (positions 1–10)
Pos.	No.	Competitor(s)	Vehicle	Class
1	12	(France) Cyril Neveu	Yamaha XT 500	Moto
2	2	(France) Gilles Comte	Yamaha XT 500	Moto
3	23	(France) Philippe Vassard	Honda XL 250S	Moto
4	162	(France) Alain Génestier (France) Joseph Terbiaut (France) Jean Lemordant	Range Rover V8	Auto
5	131	(France) Claude Marreau (France) Bernard Marreau	Renault 4 Sinpar	Auto
6	52	(France) Alain Schaecht	Honda XL 250S	Moto
7	143	(Italy) Cesare Giraudo (Italy) Antonio Cavalleri (Italy) Mario Cavalleri	Fiat Campagnola	Auto
8	3	(France) Christian Rayer	Yamaha XT 500	Moto
9	141	(Italy) Tommaso Carletti (Italy) Amarilli Carletti	Fiat Campagnola	Auto
10	134	(France) Alain Vandekerkhove (France) Gérard Dutertry (France) Daniel Pichot	Toyota BJ	Auto

Final standings (positions 11–74)
Pos.	No.	Competitor(s)	Vehicle	Class
11	73	(France) Jacques Maitrot	Honda XL 250S	Moto
12	65	(France) Hubert Auriol	Yamaha XT 500	Moto
13	21	(France) Bernard Neimer	Honda XL 250S	Moto
14	34	(France) Bernard Atanne	Honda XL 250S	Moto
15	64	(France) Laurent Gomis	Suzuki SP 370	Moto
16	100	(Monaco) Hubert Rigal (France) Dominique Rochette	Range Rover V8	Auto
17	140	(Italy) Agostino Tocci (Italy) Carlo Fucci	Fiat Campagnola	Auto
18	125	(France) Guy Chambily (France) Michel Desaunay	Toyota BJ	Auto
19	41	(France) Martine de Cortanze	Honda XL 250S	Moto
20	16	(France) Jean Pierre Dos Reis	Honda XL 250S	Moto
21	74	(France) Guy Albaret	Yamaha XT 500	Moto
22	70	(Belgium) Alain Padou	Honda XL 250S	Moto
23	150	(France) Jean-Jacques Ratet (France) Robert Ignazi	Toyota BJ	Auto
24	55	(France) Alain Martin	Honda XL 250S	Moto
25	139	(France) Philippe Catel (France) Anne Catel	Range Rover V8	Auto
26	121	(France) Michel Delannoy (France) Frédéric Harrewyn	Toyota Diesel	Auto
27	133	(France) Henri Mouren (France) Henri Braquet	Toyota BJ	Auto
28	132	(France) Pierre Minonzio (France) Jean-Louis Ledentu	Lada Niva	Auto
29	26	(France) Henri Gabrelle	Honda XL 250S	Moto
30	58	(France) Eric Popineau	Honda XL 250S	Moto
31	142	(Italy) Franco Arbizzi (Italy) Giovanni Crappolo	Fiat Campagnola	Auto
32	17	(France) Patrice Taravella	Honda XL 250S	Moto
33	76	(France) Pierre Berty	Yamaha XT 500	Moto
34	29	(France) Marie Ertaud	Yamaha XT 500	Moto
35	13	(France) Patrick Beaufront	Yamaha XT 500	Moto
36	54	(France) Bernard Gautier	Honda XL 250S	Moto
37	112	(France) Claude Neveu (France) Gary Carrera (France) Gilles Maurice	Toyota BJ	Auto
38	11	(France) Yves Bon	Yamaha XT 500	Moto
39	47	(France) Daniel Piton	Kawasaki KL 250	Moto
40	68	(France) Didier Boucher	Yamaha XT 500	Moto
41	135	(France) Dominique Fougerouse (Belgium) Christine Beckers (France) Marguerite Ondarts	Toyota BJ	Auto
42	107	(France) Christian Duboscq (France) Pierre-Emmanuel Froissart	Lada Niva	Auto
43	10	(France) Thierry Pascault	Yamaha XT 500	Moto
44	180	(France) Jean-François Dunac (France) François Beau (France) Jean-Pierre Chapel	Pinzgauer 6X6	Trucks
45	42	(France) Pascale Geurie	Honda XL 250S	Moto
46	18	(France) Pierre Mengue	Yamaha XT 500	Moto
47	113	(France) Jean-Michel Bordais (France) Marcel Quie	Range Rover V8	Auto
48	83	(France) Bernard Rigoni	Guzzi TT 500	Moto
49	110	(France) François Forestier (France) Philippe Meneau	Toyota BJ	Auto
50	62	(France) Alain Vial	Suzuki SP 370	Moto
51	172	(France) Jean-Pierre Kurrer (France) Jean-Claude Henriet	Cournil	Auto
52	176	(France) Claude Sezalory (France) Diven Casarini (France) De Frémont	Toyota BJ	Auto
53	117	(France) Bernard Lemonnier (France) Jacqueline Lemonnier	Toyota Diesel	Auto
54	138	(France) Gérard Sarrazin (France) Lucette Sarrazin	Range Rover V8	Auto
55	157	(France) Dominique Fondrillon (France) Marcel Schaecht	Toyota BJ	Auto
56	106	(France) Max Hugueny (France) Bernard Trévidic	Toyota Diesel	Auto
57	104	(France) Jean-François Piot (France) Pierre Raux (France) Jean-Pierre Boulme	Toyota BJ	Auto
58	28	(France) Max Commençal	Yamaha XT 500	Moto
59	192	(France) Daniel Petit (France) Françis Mare	Unic	Trucks
60	101	(France) Maurice Calamel (France) Michel Calamel	Land Rover	Auto
61	175	(France) René Banino (France) Henri Legourriérec	Toyota BJ	Auto
62	166	(France) Jean Dominique Clément (France) Anne Clément	Land Rover	Auto
63	72	(France) Guy Leconte	Yamaha XT 500	Moto
64	57	(France) Thierry Roghe	Honda XL 250S	Moto
65	19	(France) Grégoire Verhaeghe	Honda XL 125S	Moto
66	171	(France) Philippe Chapel (France) Sannier (France) Yves Belleville	Range Rover V8	Auto
67	174	(France) Michel Puren (France) Pierre Dumas	Range Rover V8	Auto
68	170	(France) Gil Guillot (France) Patrice Pradeau	Cournil	Auto
69	164	(France) Olivier Turcat (France) Dominique de Araujo	Cournil	Auto
70	118	(France) Pierre Chamagne (France) Raymond Thérage	Peugeot 504	Auto
71	103	(France) Daniel Nollan (France) Philippe Hayat (France) Jean-Pierre Domblides	Renault KZ	Auto
72	187	(France) Alain Mekki (France) Jean Neault	Unic	Trucks
73	165	(France) Marc André (France) Philippe Puyfoulhoux	Peugeot 404 Plateu	Auto
74	127	(France) Pierre Bouille (France) Gilles Morel	Renault 5	Auto
