= List of Dakar Rally competitors =

This is a list of notable motorsports athletes that have competed in the Dakar Rally. This list includes drivers, riders, co-drivers, and mechanics.

== Drivers ==
Name	Country	Dakar Début	Titles
Mohammed Abu-Issa	Qatar	2014	
Joseph Adua	France	2004	
Nasser Al-Attiyah	Qatar	2004	Cars - 2011, 2015
Yazeed Al-Rajhi	Saudi Arabia	2015	
Philippe Alliot	France	1988	
Fernando Alonso	Spain	2020	
Luc Alphand	France	1998	Cars - 2006
Alain Ambrosino	France	1983	
Jacques Anquetil	France	1986	
Artur Ardavichus	Kazakhstan	2011	
Zohra Ataouat	Algeria	1980	Trucks - 1980
Jean Karl Atzert	France	2013	
Hubert Auriol	France	1979	Bikes - 1981, 1983; Cars - 1992
Brian Baragwanath	South Africa	2015	
Joan Barreda	Spain	2011	
Matthieu Baumel	France	2005	Cars (co-driver) - 2015
Piotr Beaupre	Poland	2012	
Christine Beckers	Belgium	1979	
Bernard Béguin	France	1985	
Paul Belmondo	France	1990	
Luciano Benavides	Argentina	2018	
Denis Berezovskiy	Kazakhstan	2011	
Miki Biasion	Italy	1999	
Jorge Andrés Boero	Argentina	2011	
Lucas Bonetto	Argentina	2012	
Charley Boorman	Great Britain	2006	
Wessel Bosman	South Africa	2015	
Jan Roelf Bouwknegt	New Zealand	2015	
Claude Brasseur	France	1981	Cars (co-driver) - 1983
Jean-Claude Briavoine	France	1980	
Alex Caffi	Monaco	2012	
Andy Caldecott	Australia	2004	
Ignacio Casale	Chile	2010	Quads - 2014
Kurt Caselli	United States	2013	
Caroline Casiraghi Princess	Monaco	1985	
David Casteu	France	2003	
Matt Campbell	Canada	2014	
Jost Capito	Germany	1983	Trucks (co-driver) - 1985
Karl-Friedrich Capito	Germany	1981	Trucks - 1985
Petar Cenkov	Bulgaria	2011	
Ronan Chabot	France	2003	
Vladimir Chagin	Russia	1990	Trucks - 2000, 2002, 2003, 2004, 2006, 2010, 2011
Guerlain Chicherit	France	2005	
Quinn Cody	United States	2011	
Nunzio Coffaro	Venezuela	2012	Cars T1.2 - 2012
Marc Coma	Spain	2002	Bikes - 2006, 2009, 2011, 2014, 2015
Gilles Comte	France	1979	
Tim Coronel	Netherlands	2007	
Tom Coronel	Netherlands	2007	
Hervé Cotel	France	1980	
Jean-Paul Cottret	France	1999	Cars (co-driver) - 2004, 2005, 2007, 2012, 2013
Andrew Cowan	Great Britain	1983	
Jacek Czachor	Poland	2000	
Marek Dabrowski	Poland	2000	
Peter Dalkin	Great Britain	1980	
Bernard Darniche	France	1983	
Christophe Declerck	France	2009	
Cyril Despres	France	2000	Bikes - 2005, 2007, 2010, 2012, 2013
Carlo de Gavardo	Chile	1996	
Gérard de Rooy	Netherlands	2002	Trucks - 2012, 2016
Jan de Rooy	Netherlands	1982	Trucks - 1987
Giniel de Villiers	South Africa	2003	Cars - 2009
Roberto di Persio	Italy	1991	
Alain Duclos	France	2000	
Romain Dumas	France	2015	
Vic Elford	Great Britain	1982	
Beñat Errandonea	Andorra	2003	
Ruben Faria	Portugal	2006	
Ignacio Flores	Peru	2012	
Xavier Foj	Spain	1991	
Jean-Pierre Fontenay	France	1989	Cars - 1998
Paulo Fiuza	Portugal	2007	
Philippe Gache	France	2003	
Victor Gallegos	Chile	2014	
Alain Génestier	France	1979	Cars - 1979
Raphael Gimbre	France	1985	
Jordi Ginesta	Andorra	1987	
Jeremias González	Argentina	2014	
Robby Gordon	United States	2005	
Timo Gottschalk	Germany	2007	Cars (co-driver) - 2011
Georges Groine	France	1981	Trucks - 1982, 1983
Albert Grimaldi	Monaco	1985	
Sebastián Guayasamin	Ecuador	2014	
Rodolfo Guilloli	Guatemala	2015	
Cristina Gutiérrez	Spain	2017	Challenger - 2024
Emanuel Gyenes	Romania	2007	
Kasih Hanggoro	Indonesia	2010	
Michał Hernik	Poland	2015	
Michel Hidalgo	France	1991	
Krzysztof Hołowczyc	Poland	2005	
Jacques Houssat	France	1985	Trucks - 1991
Todor Hristov	Bulgaria	2011	
Sebastian Husseini	Netherlands	2013	
Gert Huzink	Netherlands	2012	
Jacky Ickx	Belgium	1981	Cars - 1983
Jean-Pierre Jabouille	France	1984	
Clayton Jacobsen	Australia	2014	
Ivan Jakeš	Slovakia	2007	
Jean-Pierre Jaussaud	France	1982	
Peter Jerie	Australia	2005	
Firdaus Kabirov	Russia	2000	Trucks - 2005, 2009
Juha Kankkunen	Finland	1988	Cars - 1988
Andrey Karginov	Russia	2010	Trucks - 2014
Ukyo Katayama	Japan	2002	
Jutta Kleinschmidt	Germany	1988	Cars - 2001
Ondrej Klymciw	Czech Republic	2015	
Henk Knuiman	Netherlands	1999	
Raymond Kopa	France	1985	
Corrine Koppenhague	France	1979	
Freddy Kottulinsky	Sweden	1980	Cars - 1980
Jacques Laffite	France	1988	
Sergio Lafuente	Uruguay	2011	
Jan Lammers	Netherlands	2010	
Pierre Lartigue	France	1982	Cars - 1994, 1995, 1996
Gérard Lenorman	France	1990	
Camélia Liparoti	Italy	2009	
Albert Llovera	Andorra	2007	
Sébastien Loeb	France	2016	
Aleš Loprais	Czech Republic	2006	
Karel Loprais	Czech Republic	1986	Trucks - 1988, 1994, 1995, 1998, 1999, 2001
Gianni Lora Lamia	Italy	1990	
Josef Macháček	Czech Republic	1999	Quads - 2009
Thierry Magnaldi	France	1990	
Henri Magne	France	1982	Cars (co-driver) - 1997, 2000
Adam Małysz	Poland	2012	
Ayrat Mardeev	Russia	2009	Trucks - 2015
Bernard Marreau	France	1979	Cars (co-driver) - 1982
Claude Marreau	France	1979	Cars - 1982
Hiroshi Masuoka	Japan	1987	Cars - 2002, 2003
Alister McRae	Great Britain	2009	
Colin McRae	Great Britain	2004	
Sue Mead	United States	2000	
Fabrizio Meoni	Italy	1992	Bikes - 2001, 2002
Michel Merel	France	1980	
René Metge	France	1979	Cars - 1981, 1984, 1986
Mark Miller	United States	2002	
Jiří Moskal	Czech Republic	1986	Trucks - 1986, 1987, 1988
Jes Munk	Denmark	2011	
Cyril Neveu	France	1979	Bikes - 1979, 1980, 1982, 1986, 1987
Eduard Nikolaev	Russia	2007	Trucks - 2013
Walter Nosiglia	Bolivia	2014	
Edi Orioli	Italy	1986	Bikes - 1988, 1990, 1994, 1996
Alain Padou	Belgium	1979	
Olivier Pain	France	2006	
Eric Palante	Belgium	2003	
Alejandro Patronelli	Argentina	2010	Quads - 2011, 2012
Marcos Patronelli	Argentina	2009	Quads - 2010, 2013
Llewelyn Pavey	Australia	2015	
Simon Pavey	Australia	1998	
Michel Périn	France	1993	Cars (co-driver) - 1994, 1995, 1996, 2014
Henri Pescarolo	France	1980	
Stéphane Peterhansel	France	1988	Bikes - 1991, 1992, 1993, 1995, 1997, 1998; Cars - 2004, 2005, 2007, 2012, 2013
Loïck Peyron	France	1988	
Jean-Marie Pfaff	Belgium	2003	
Leeroy Poulter	South Africa	2014	
Toby Price	Australia	2015	
Jakub Przygonski	Poland	2009	
Pablo Quintanilla	Chile	2013	
Jean Ragnotti	France	1980	
Gaston Rahier	Belgium	1983	Bikes - 1984, 1985
Jean-Jacques Ratet	France	1979	
Christian Rayer	France	1979	
Yves Rénier	Switzerland	1980	
Peter Reif	Austria	1991	Trucks - 1997
Alicia Reina	Argentina	2014	
Hubert Rigal	Monaco	1979	
Hélder Rodrigues	Portugal	2006	
Nani Roma	Spain	1996	Bikes - 2004; Cars - 2014
Willem Saaijman	South Africa	2015	
Bruno Saby	France	1992	Cars - 1993
Richard Sainct	France	1991	Bikes - 1999, 2000, 2003
Carlos Sainz	Spain	2006	Cars - 2010, 2020
Eliseo Salazar	Chile	2009	
Juan Carlos Salvatierra	Bolivia	2011	
Nelson Sanabria	Paraguay	2014	
Laia Sanz	Spain	2011	
Jean-Louis Schlesser	France	1984	Cars - 1999, 2000
Annie Seel	Sweden	2002	
Kenjiro Shinozuka	Japan	1986	Cars - 1997
Paul Smith	Australia	2013	
Rafał Sonik	Poland	2009	Quads - 2015
Dmitry Sotnikov	Russia	2014	
Carlos Sousa	Portugal	1995	
Emiliano Spataro	Argentina	2011	
Guilherme Spinelli	Brazil	2009	
Hans Stacey	Netherlands	2004	Trucks - 2007
Chuck Stearns	United States	1985	Bikes - 1985
Jonah Street	United States	2006	
Teruhito Sugawara	Japan	1999	
Yoshimasa Sugawara	Japan	1983	
Sam Sunderland	Great Britain	2012	
Elmer Symons	South Africa	2005	
Zoltán Szaller	Hungary	2009	
Patrick Tambay	France	1987	
Sylviane Telliez	France	1980	
Orlando Terranova	Argentina	2005	
Mark Thatcher	Great Britain	1982	
Maurice Trintignant	France	1982	
André Trossat	France	1980	
Pål Anders Ullevålseter	Norway	2002	
Jurgen van den Goorbergh	Netherlands	2009	
Peter van Merksteijn, Sr.	Netherlands	2009	
Aleksandr Vasilevski	Belarus	2012	
Vladimir Vasilyev	Russia	2013	
Philippe Vassard	France	1979	
Ari Vatanen	Finland	1987	Cars - 1987, 1989, 1990, 1991
Jordi Viladoms	Spain	2006	
Federico Villagra	Argentina	2014	
André Villas-Boas	Portugal	2018	
Adrien Villette	France	1981	Trucks - 1981
Giacomo Vismara	Italy	1984	Trucks - 1986
Dirk von Zitzewitz	Germany	1997	Cars (co-driver) - 2009
Matthias Walkner	Austria	2015	
Achim Warmbold	Germany	1985	
Koen Wauters	Belgium	1999	
Patrick Zaniroli	France	1980	Cars - 1985

== Gallery ==
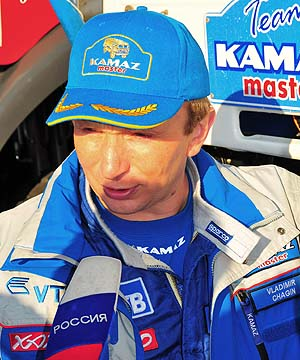
Vladimir Chagin, six times winner in the trucks category

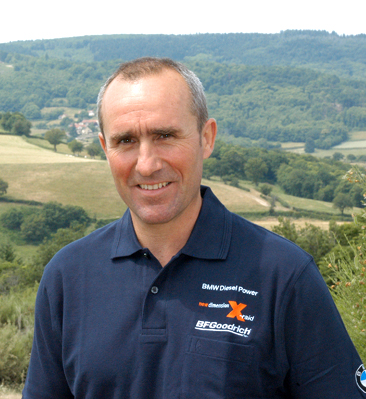
Stéphane Peterhansel, an eleven times winner in trucks and car

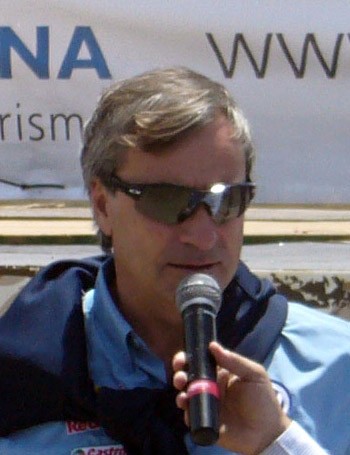
Carlos Sainz won the Dakar Rally in 2010

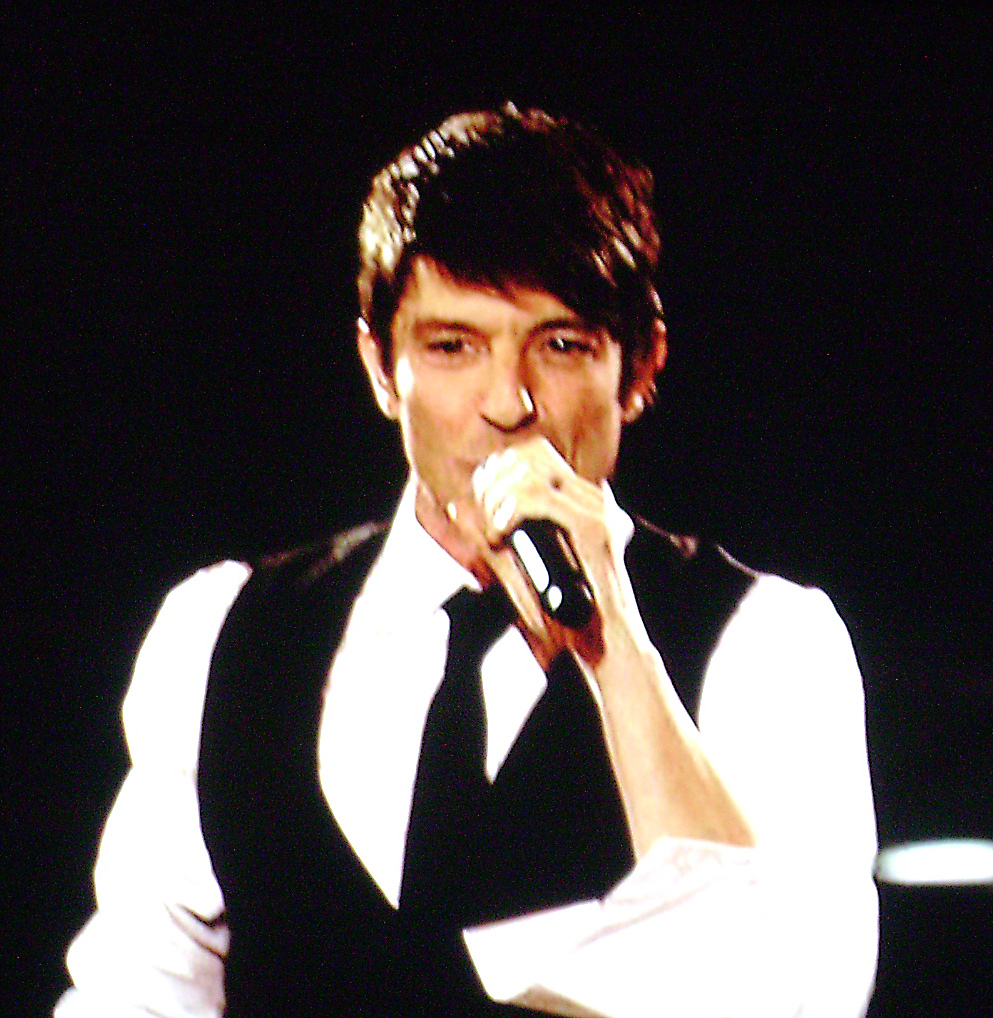
Belgian television presenter Koen Wauters competes in the rally frequently

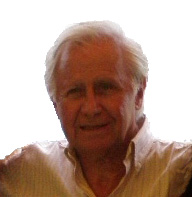
French footballer Michel Hidalgo took part in Paris-Dakar in 1991

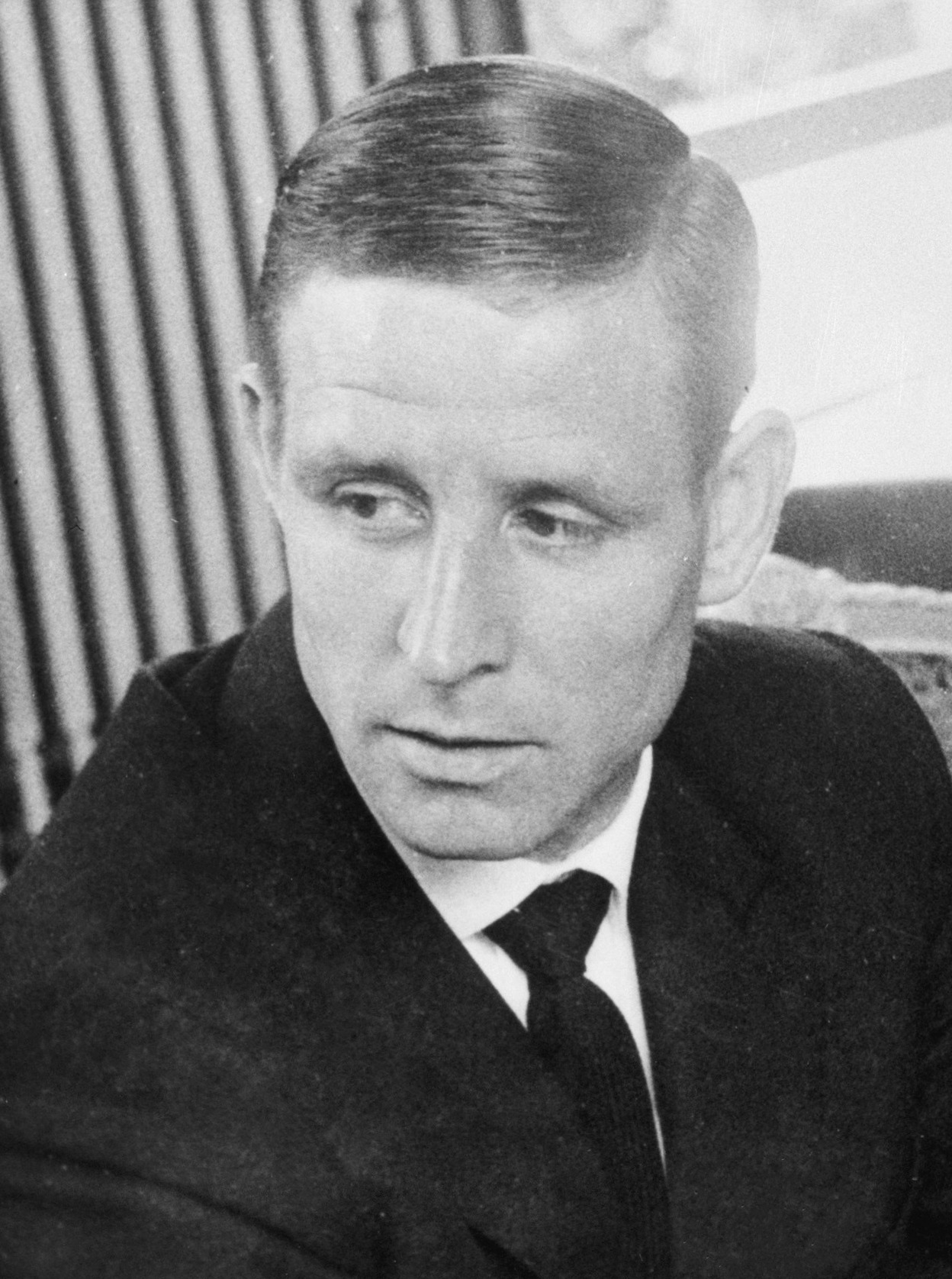
French footballer Raymond Kopa took part in Paris-Dakar in 1985

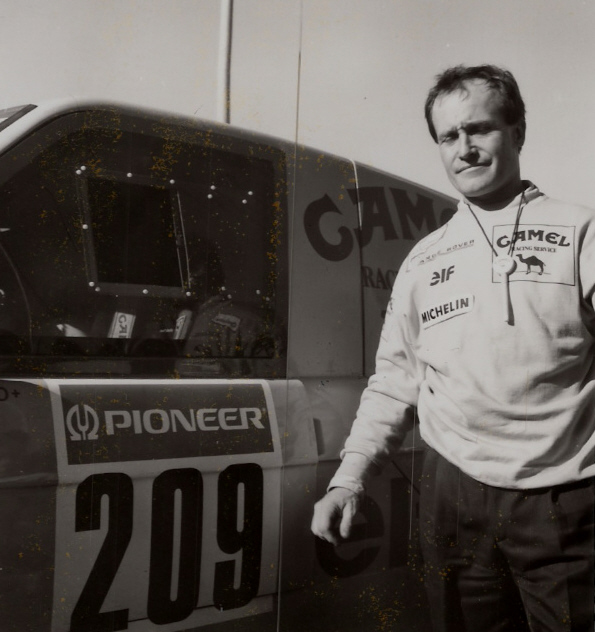
French driver Patrick Zaniroli during the 1988 Paris-Dakar

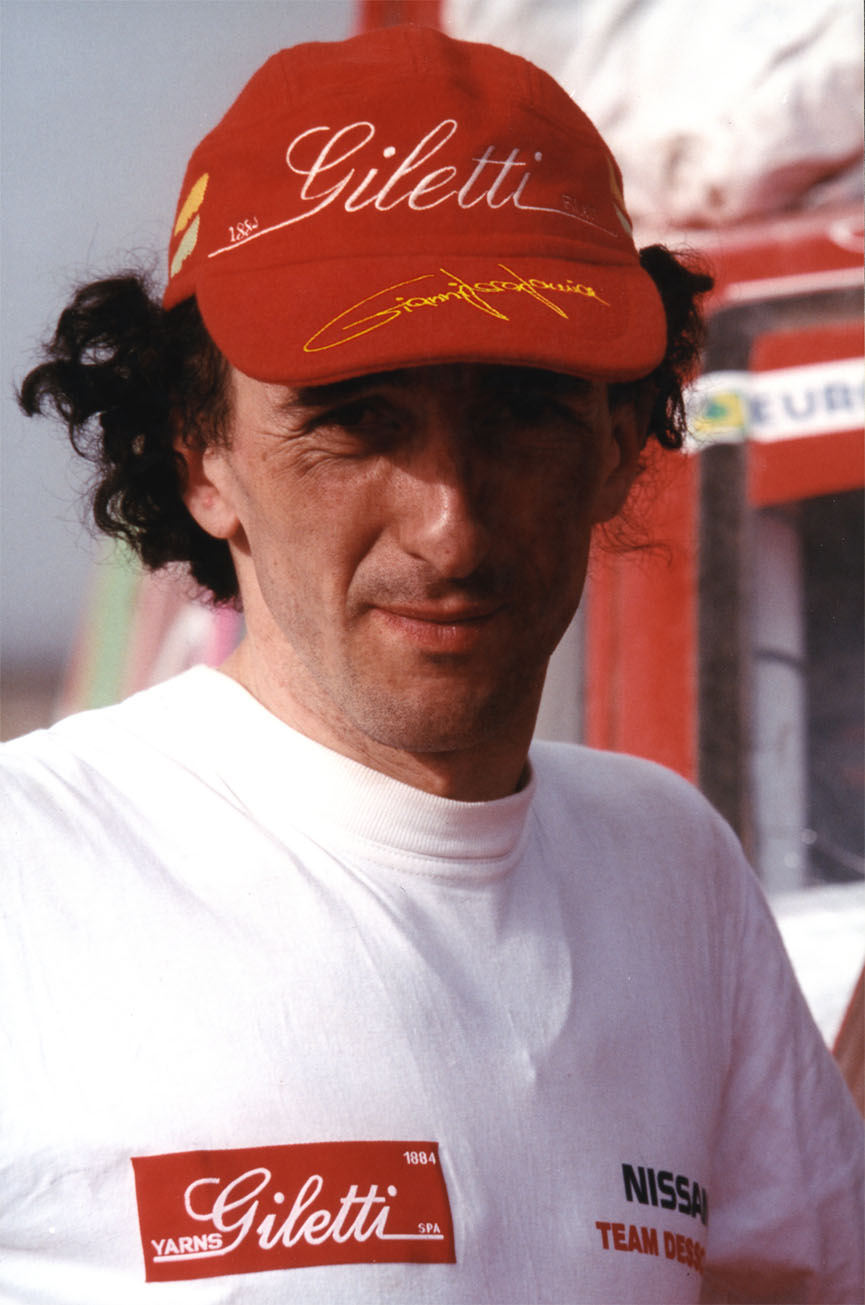
Gianni Lora Lamia During the Granada-Dakar 1999. Italian rally raid driver, he took part in numerous editions of the Dakar Rally from 1989 to 2004 and other international rally raid races representing Italy.

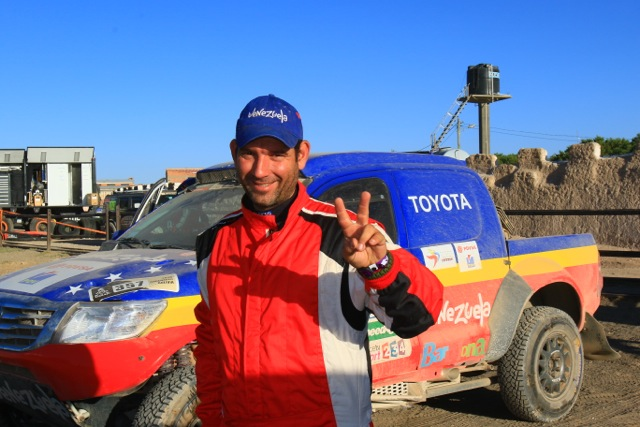
Nunzio Coffaro, Piloto de automovilismo, Rally Cross Country, ha participado en numerosas ocaciones en competencias internacionales representando a Venezuela.
