= 1980 Paris–Dakar Rally =

Off-road motorsport event in France and Africa

← Previous event	Next event →
- Host country: France; Algeria; Mali; Upper Volta; Senegal

1980 Dakar Rally also known as the 1980 Paris–Dakar Rally was the 2nd running of the Dakar Rally event, starting from Paris on 1 January and finishing in Dakar on the 23 January. The 1980 event saw vehicle manufacturers such as Yamaha, Volkswagen, Lada, and BMW taking part and the introduction of a truck category.

== Summary ==
216 competitors started the rally of which 81 made the finish. Cyril Neveu won for the second time in succession on a Yamaha, Freddy Kottulinsky won the car class driving a Volkswagen Iltis and Zohra Ataouat became the first winner of the truck class driving for Sonacome.

== Entry list ==
=== Number of entries ===
Stage	Bikes	Cars	Trucks	Total
Start of rally	90	116	10	216
End of rally	25	49	7	81

=== Competitor list ===
Entry list — Bikes

No.	Driver	Bike
1	(France) Dominique Boisgontier	Yamaha DTMX 125
2	(France) Pierre David	MZ 250
3	(France) Martine De Cortanze	Yamaha 500
4	(France) Grégoire Verhaeghe	Honda XLS 250
5	(France) Yvan Tcherniavsky	Vespa P200E
6	(France) Bernard Tcherniavsky	Vespa P200E
7	(France) Bernard Neimer	Vespa P200E
8	(France) Marc Simonot	Vespa P200E
9	(France) Hubert D'aboville	Kawasaki KL 250
10	(France) Norbert D'aboville	Kawasaki KL 250
11	(France) Guillaume D'aboville	Kawasaki KL 250
12	(France) Baudouin D'aboville	Kawasaki KL 250
13	(France) Gérard D'aboville	Kawasaki KL 250
14	(France) Christine Martin	Honda XLS 250
15	(France) Nicole Maitrot	Honda XLS 250
16	(France) Jacques Maitrot	Honda XLS 250
17	(France) Jean-Louis Daudet	Yamaha DMX 250
18	(France) Pierre-Michel Decombeix	Honda XLS 250
21	(France) Michel Montange	Suzuki SP 370
22	(France) Marc Joineau	Suzuki SP 370
23	(France) Michel Razet	Suzuki SP 370
24	(France) Jean-Pierre Tonnelline	Suzuki SP 370
25	(France) Jean-Noël Castanet	Suzuki SP 370
26	(France) Bernard Tabarly	Suzuki SP 370
27	(France) Gilbert Galinier	Suzuki SP 370
28	(France) Alain Fesquet	Honda XLS 500
29	(France) Bruno Vecchioni	Honda XLS 500
30	(France) Thierry Henriette	Yamaha XT 500
31	(France) Pierre Mengue	Yamaha XT 500
32	(France) Jean-Michel Yvora	Yamaha XT 500
33	(France) Gilbert Lebrun	Honda XLS 500
34	(France) Louis Leandri	Honda XLS 250
35	(France) Jean-Pierre Lerude	Honda XLS 500
36	(France) Luc Quesson	Honda XLS 500
37	(Belgium) Alain Gaeremynck	Honda XR 500
38	(Belgium) Alain Padou	Honda XR 500
39	(France) Daniel René	Honda XLS 500
41	(France) Bernard Rigoni	Honda XLS 500
42	(France) Gilles Desheulles	KTM 240
43	(France) Philippe Vassard	KTM 240
44	(France) Marie Ertaud	Yamaha XT 500
45	(France) François De Casanove	Yamaha XT 500
46	(France) Philippe De Casanove	Yamaha XT 500
47	(France) Jacques-Philippe Auriol	Yamaha XT 500
48	(France) Ludovic Loue	Yamaha XT 500
49	(France) Gilles Maurice	Yamaha XT 500
50	(France) Cyril Neveu	Yamaha XT 500
51	(France) Pierre Berty	Yamaha XT 500
52	(France) Flavien Malguy	Yamaha XT 500
53	(France) Jean-claude Lesault	Yamaha XT 500
54	(France) Patrick Beaufront	Yamaha XT 500
55	(France) Pierre-henri Hollenweger	Yamaha XT 500
56	(France) Patrick Duisit	Yamaha XT 500
57	(France) Alain Dupuis	Yamaha XT 500
58	(France) Michel Merel	Yamaha XT 500
59	(France) Eric Breton	Yamaha XT 500
60	(France) Jean-Noël Pineau	Yamaha XT 500
61	(France) Patrice Roa	Yamaha XT 500
62	(France) Jean-Michel Plu	Yamaha XT 500
63	(France) Jean-claude Dinga	Yamaha XT 500
64	(France) Christian Figlia	Yamaha XT 500
65	(France) Jean-Luc Delchet	Yamaha XT 500
66	(France) Serge Stacoffe	Yamaha XT 500
67	(Belgium) Christian Becker	Yamaha XT 500
68	(France) Philippe Léonard	Yamaha XT 500
69	(France) Patrick Meziani	Yamaha XT 500
70	(France) Antoine Mayorga	Yamaha XT 500
71	(France) Dante Favaro	Yamaha XT 500
72	(France) Jean-Michel Lyonnard	Yamaha XT 500
73	(France) Jean-Pierre Tisserant	Yamaha XT 500
74	(France) Guy Albaret	Yamaha XT 500
75	(France) Gilles Burgat	Yamaha XT 500
76	(France) Pascal D'ursel	Yamaha XT 500
77	(France) Daniel Lorenzini	Yamaha XT 500
78	(France) Jean-Jacques Lefebvre	Yamaha XT 500
79	(France) Gérard Paineau	Yamaha XT 500
80	(France) Jean-Pierre Lloret	Yamaha XT 500
81	(France) Christian Rayer	Yamaha XT 500
82	(France) Gilles Comte	Yamaha XT 500
83	(France) Gérard Ladaurade	Yamaha XT 500
85	(France) Michel Cheylan	Ducati 750
86	(France) Georges Fenouil	BMW 800
87	(France) Hubert Auriol	BMW 800
88	(France) Pascal Boujieau	BMW 1000 Proto
89	(Switzerland) Giorgio Tabarin (Switzerland) Claude Lampart	Side 1000
90	(France) Vincent Murgat (France) Claude Boyet	Side 1000

Entry list — Cars

No.	Driver	Co-driver	Co-driver 2/Technician	Technician 2	Vehicle
91	(France) Yann Pawoe	(France) Sitahar	-	-	Peugeot 404
92	(France) Bernard Jaure	(France) Louis Injey	-	-	Peugeot 404
93	(France) Alain Kurt	(France) André Eletufe	-	-	Peugeot 404
96	(France) Jean-Claude Avoyne	(France) Bertrand Leclercq	-	-	Citroën Traction
97	(France) Corinne Koppenhague	(France) Marie Françoise Placq	-	-	Jeep Hotchkiss
98	(France) Daniel Nollan	(France) Philippe Hayat	-	-	Renault KZ
99	(France) Jocelyn Minatchy	(France) Sylviane Tromeur	(France) Hervé David	(France) Joelle Ilous	Renault R2087
100	(United Kingdom) Peter Dalkin	(United Kingdom) John Waghorn	-	-	Citroën GSA X3
101	(France) François Destruel	(France) Thierry Perichard	-	-	Renault 5
102	(France) Bernard Hervier	(France) Christian Caillon	-	-	Range Rover V8
104	(France) Yves Sunhill	-	-	-	Buggy Sunhill 1980
105	(France) Hervé Cotel	(France) Claude Corbetta	-	-	Buggy Cotel
106	(France) Bertrand Roncin	(France) Benoît Bizet	-	-	Citroën DS
107	(France) Monique Delannoy	(France) Catherine Bordier Bonnier	-	-	Peugeot 504
108	(France) Noël Gron	(France) Alain Enderlen	-	-	Peugeot 504 Coupe
109	(France) Jean-Michel Neyrial	(France) Patrick Fournol	-	-	Peugeot 504
110	(France) Guy Asensi	(France) Adelino Vaz	-	-	Peugeot 504
111	(France) Gérard Boin	(France) Marcel Cusson	-	-	Peugeot 504
112	(France) Claude Delles	(France) Jean-Pierre Lamy	(France) Alain Biron	-	Citroën DS
113	(Senegal) Ibrahim Thiandoum	(Senegal) El-Hadj Sow	-	-	Citroën CX
114	(France) André Costa	(France) Alain Corroler	-	-	Citroën CX
115	(France) Jean-Pierre Giovannini	(France) Jean-Jacques Cibien	-	-	Citroën CX Break
117	(France) Thierry Armanet	(France) Claude Cravero	-	-	Peugeot 504 Break
120	(France) Claude Marreau	(France) Bernard Marreau	-	-	Renault 4 Sinpar
121	(France) Yves Belleville	(France) Daniel Michel	-	-	Citroën AK 400
122	(France) Hugues Dubois	(France) Charles Mignard	-	-	Lada Niva
123	(France) Sylviane Goutaland	(France) Michèle Autun	-	-	Lada Niva
124	(France) Lino Bonaldi	(France) Bernard Pailloux	-	-	Lada Niva
125	(France) Christian Duboscq	(France) Jacqueline Duboscq	-	-	Lada Niva
126	(France) André Trossat	(France) Jacky Touron	-	-	Lada Niva
127	(France) Christine Dacremont	(France) Joëlle Pioch	-	-	Lada Niva
128	(France) Jean-Claude Briavoine	(France) Bernard Clerisse	-	-	Lada Niva
129	(France) Jean-Louis Hervieu	(France) Jean-Paul Verneuil	-	-	Lada Niva
130	(France) Gil Guillot	(France) Patrice Pradeau	-	-	Cournil
131	(France) Patrick Thenoux	(France) Olivier Gouilloud	-	-	Cournil
132	(France) Olivier Turcat	(France) Dominique de Araujo	-	-	Cournil
133	(France) Jean-Pierre Kurrer	(France) Jean-Marie Chanteux	-	-	Cournil
135	(France) Frédéric Harrewyn	(France) Lyonel Liger	-	-	Mercedes-Benz 240 GD
136	(France) Patrick Zaniroli	(France) Philippe Colesse	-	-	Volkswagen Iltis
137	(Sweden) Freddy Kottulinsky	(Germany) Gerd Löffelmann	-	-	Volkswagen Iltis
138	(France) Jean Ragnotti	(France) Georges Vaills	-	-	Volkswagen Iltis
139	(Germany) Roland Gumpert	(Germany) Eder Alois	-	-	Volkswagen Iltis
140	(France) Pierre Raux	(France) Jean-louis Raimondi	-	-	Toyota BJ
141	(France) Max Sachsenhaus	Unknown	-	-	Toyota BJ
143	(France) Alain Berla	(France) C. Arbin	(France) J.-P. Henriot	-	Toyota BJ
144	(France) Alain Bard	(France) Pascal Daniel	-	-	Toyota BJ
145	(France) Jo Tougeron	(France) Didier Ratouit	-	-	Toyota BJ
146	(France) Pierre Laville	(France) Philippe Michel	-	-	Toyota BJ
147	(France) Jean-Pierre Pastissie	(France) Gérard Dantan Merlin	(France) Jean-Claude Andreoli	-	Toyota BJ
148	(France) Gérard Barral	(Belgium) François Besnard	-	-	Toyota BJ43
149	(France) Rousseau	(France) Gary Carrera	-	-	Toyota BJ
151	(France) Max Hugueny	(France) Jean-Fred Prost	-	-	Toyota BJ
152	(France) Marcel Hugueny	(France) Carlos Santos	-	-	Toyota BJ
153	(France) Robert Barbe	(France) Claude Duriaux	(France) Pierre Mesplomb	-	Toyota BJ
154	(France) Patrick Remusat	(France) François Pruvot	-	-	Toyota BJ
155	(France) Jean Léonard	(France) Blondeau	-	-	Toyota BJ
156	(Switzerland) Jean-Claude Geiser	(France) Eric Roblin	-	-	Toyota BJ
157	(France) Jacques Delefortrie	(France) Pierre Delefortrie	(France) Patrick Prat	-	Toyota BJ43
158	Lhamery	Williart	-	-	Toyota BJ
159	(France) Pierre Coquant	(France) Bernard Atanne	(France) Cardinal	-	Toyota BJ
160	(France) Yves Renier	(France) Yves Genies	(France) Pat Le Guen	-	Toyota BJ
161	(France) Philippe Leroux	(France) Luigi Maserati	-	-	Toyota BJ
162	(France) Jean-Claude Bonaldi	(France) Marcel Baffeleuf	-	-	Toyota BJ
163	(France) Roland Mollard	(France) Christine Dransard	-	-	Toyota BJ
164	(France) Henri Lizard	(France) Jean-Jacques Soriano	-	-	Toyota BJ
165	(France) Michel Delannoy	(France) Gérard Badiou	-	-	Toyota BJ
166	(France) Gérard Planson	(France) Francis Paulian	-	-	Toyota HJ45
167	(Belgium) Pierre Heinis	(Belgium) Edi Paul Heinis	-	-	Toyota BJ
168	(France) Guichard	(France) Flamain	(France) Soler	-	Toyota BJ
169	(France) Philippe Mongin	(France) Jean-Etienne Souvant	(France) Christian Simonpietri	-	Toyota BJ
171	(France) Louis Andrieu	(France) Christian Bouillon	-	-	Toyota BJ
172	(France) Fisquet	(France) Naon	(France) Bongiovani	-	Toyota BJ
173	(France) Ghislain Moy	(France) Michel Indlet	(France) Régis Noury	-	Toyota BJ40
174	(France) Christian Rodier	(France) Brigitte Mairesse	-	-	Toyota BJ
175	(Belgium) Jean-Claude Vanbersy	(Belgium) Thierry De Mortier	-	-	Daihatsu
176	(Belgium) Claude Bourgoignie	(Belgium) Jean-Pierre Tasiaux	(Belgium) Maurice Gierst	-	Range Rover V8
177	(Belgium) Christine Beckers	(Belgium) Thierry Gérin	(Belgium) Marc Stinglhamber	-	Range Rover V8
178	(France) Michel Puren	(France) Philippe Chapel	-	-	Range Rover Proto Turbo
179	(France) Claude Neveu	(France) Jean-Paul Auborg	-	-	Range Rover V8
180	(France) Christophe Neveu	(France) Rémy Bourgoin	-	-	Range Rover V8
181	(France) François Forestier	(France) Bernard Galego	-	-	Range Rover V8
182	(France) Philippe Versini	(France) Daniel Adrian	-	-	Range Rover V8
183	(France) Daniel Bejuy	(France) Denis Capecci	-	-	Range Rover V8
184	(France) Mario Constans-Gavarry	(France) Philippe Bertelin	-	-	Range Rover V8
185	(France) Jean-Paul Sevin	(France) Kalicky	-	-	Range Rover V8
186	(France) Catherine Dufresne	(France) Martine Renier	(France) Christian Crye	-	Range Rover V8
187	(France) Philippe Chateau	(France) Alain Boyer	-	-	Range Rover V8
188	(France) Claude Guermonprez	(France) Jean-Claude Ravez	-	-	Range Rover V8
189	(France) Jean-Michel Bordais	(France) Marcel Quie	-	-	Range Rover V8
190	(France) Robert Claudin	(France) Marie-Claude Claudin	-	-	Range Rover V8
191	(France) Yannick Le Maguer	(France) Patrick Morvan	-	-	Range Rover V8
192	(France) Jean-Pierre Simon	(France) Etienne Boulanger	-	-	Range Rover V8
193	(France) Antoine Granja	(France) José Lourseau	(France) Jean-Pierre Lefèvre	-	Range Rover V8
194	(France) Alain Kerc	(France) Jean-Paul Ydraut	-	-	Renault 12
196	(France) Henri Pescarolo	(France) Mauro Bellatriacia	-	-	Land Rover
197	(France) René Trautmann	(France) Roberto Valleci	-	-	Land Rover
198	(France) François Brébant	(France) Dominique Nayrole	-	-	Land Rover
199	(France) Jean-Pierre Hanrioud	(Italy) Moreno Bertini	-	-	Land Rover
200	(France) Jean-François Piot	(Italy) Bruno Spragia	-	-	Land Rover
201	(United Kingdom) Anthony Howard	(United Kingdom) Anne Hope	-	-	Range Rover V8
202	(Switzerland) Daniel Neri	(Switzerland) Jean-Claude Neri	-	-	Jeep CJ7
203	(Switzerland) Enrico Paci	(Switzerland) Willy Freiburghaus	-	-	Jeep Wagoneer
204	(France) Michel Diallo	Rispal	-	-	Sbarro Windhound
205	(France) Henri Cotentin	(France) Serge Blanchard	-	-	AMC Cherokee
206	(France) Nicolas Hulot	(France) Jean-Paul Flory	(France) Etienne-Georges Baitifoulier	-	Range Rover V8
207	(France) Jean-Jacques Bordier	(France) Dominique Lemoyne	-	-	Land Rover
210	(France) Christian De Léotard	(France) Francis Dumortier	-	-	Renault 5 6x6
211	(France) Christian Tamalet	(France) Françoise Tamalet	-	-	Pinzgauer
212	(France) Jacques Clatot	(France) Jean-Claude Kaiser	(Austria) Dietmar Beinhauer	-	Pinzgauer

Entry list — Trucks

No.	Driver	Co-driver	Technician	Vehicle
221	(France) Eric Della Torre	(France) Pottier	-	Mercedes-Benz Unimog
222	(France) Georges Groine	(France) Bruno Groine	(France) Hugues Larrouzé	Mercedes-Benz LP913
223	(France) Bernard Heu	(France) Daniel Delobel	(France) Gilbert Versino	MAN 20280
224	(France) Catherine Plessis	(France) Guillautie	(France) André Deliaire	MAN
225	(France) Jean-Claude Marie	(France) Cyril Boulay	-	Renault SM8
226	(France) Jacques Frumholtz	(France) Francis Doz	-	Renault SM8
227	(Algeria) Mouhamed Affane	(Algeria) Bouhafs Zergoune	(Algeria) Lakhdar Haddou	Sonacome
228	(Algeria) Miloud Ataouat	(Algeria) Hadj Daou Boukrif	(Algeria) Mahiedine Kaoula	Sonacome
229	(Algeria) Abdelkader Bouzid	(Algeria) Daid	(Algeria) Mekhelef	Sonacome
230	(France) René Metge	(France) Thierry De Saulieu	(France) Georges Landais	Leyland Marathon

== Stages ==
Stage	Date	From	To	Dist.	Winner (cars)	Winner (bikes)
P	1 January	(France) Paris	(France) Olivet	4	(France) J-C. Briavoine	(France) C. Neveu
P	2 January	(France) Olivet	(France) Marseille		Liaison only	
	3–5 January	Transportation to Africa				
1	6 January	(Algeria) Algiers	(Algeria) In Salah	37	(France) J-C. Briavoine	(France) C. Neveu
2	7 January	(Algeria) In Salah	(Algeria) Reggane	270	(France) C. Neveu	(France) E. Breton
2	8 January	(Algeria) Reggane	(Algeria) Bordj Badji Mokhtar	630	(France) J. Ragnotti	(France) M. Merel
2	9 January	(Algeria) Bordj Badji Mokhtar	(Mali) Gao	675	(Sweden) F. Kottulinsky	(France) H. Auriol
	10 January	(Mali) Gao		Rest day		
3	11 January	(Mali) Gao	(Mali) Mopti	595	(Sweden) F. Kottulinsky	(France) H. Auriol
3	12 January	(Mali) Mopti	(Mali) Niono		Liaison only	
3	13 January	(Mali) Niono	(Mali) Tombouctou	570	(France) J. Ragnotti	(France) G. Desheulles
3	14 January	(Mali) Tombouctou	(Mali) Gao	424	(France) C. Neveu	(France) H. Auriol
4	15 January	(Mali) Gao	(Republic of Upper Volta) Bobo-Dioulasso		Liaison only	
5	16 January	(Republic of Upper Volta) Bobo-Dioulasso	(Mali) Kolokani	120	(Sweden) F. Kottulinsky	(France) M. Merel
	17 January	(Mali) Kolokani		Rest day		
6	18 January	(Mali) Kolokani	(Mali) Nioro du Sahel	280	(France) C. Marreau	(France) C. Neveu
6	19 January	(Mali) Nioro du Sahel	(Mali) Kayes	247	(Sweden) F. Kottulinsky	(France) P. Vassard
7	20 January	(Mali) Kayes	(Senegal) Bakel		Liaison only	
7	21 January	(Senegal) Bakel	(Senegal) Linguère		Liaison only	
7	22 January	(Senegal) Linguère	(Senegal) Lompoul	87	(France) H. Cotel	(France) P. Vassard
7	23 January	(Senegal) Lompoul	(Senegal) Dakar	120	(France) C. Neveu	(France) C. Neveu

== Leading results ==
=== Bikes ===
Pos.	No.	Competitors	Vehicle
1	50	(France) Cyril Neveu	Yamaha XT 500
2	58	(France) Michel Merel	Yamaha XT 500
3	60	(France) Jean-Noël Pineau	Yamaha XT 500
4	80	(France) Jean-Pierre Lloret	Yamaha XT 500
5	86	(France) "Fenouil"	BMW 800
6	43	(France) Philippe Vassard	KTM 240
7	38	(Belgium) Alain Padou	Honda XR 500
8	48	(France) Ludovic Loue	Yamaha XT 500
9	74	(France) Guy Albaret	Yamaha XT 500
10	22	(France) Marc Joineau	Suzuki SP 370

=== Cars ===
Pos.	No.	Competitor	Vehicle
1	137	(Sweden) Freddy Kottulinsky (West Germany) Gerd Löffelmann	Volkswagen Iltis
2	136	(France) Patrick Zaniroli (France) Philippe Colesse	Volkswagen Iltis
3	120	(France) Claude Marreau (France) Bernard Marreau	Renault 4
4	138	(France) Jean Ragnotti (France) Georges Vaills	Volkswagen Iltis
5	180	(France) Christophe Neveu (France) Rémy Bourgoin	Range Rover

- Of the 216 starters, 81 completed the event - 49 cars (of 116), 25 bikes (of 90) and 7 trucks (of 10).
