= Yamaha XT 600 =

Model of motorcycle

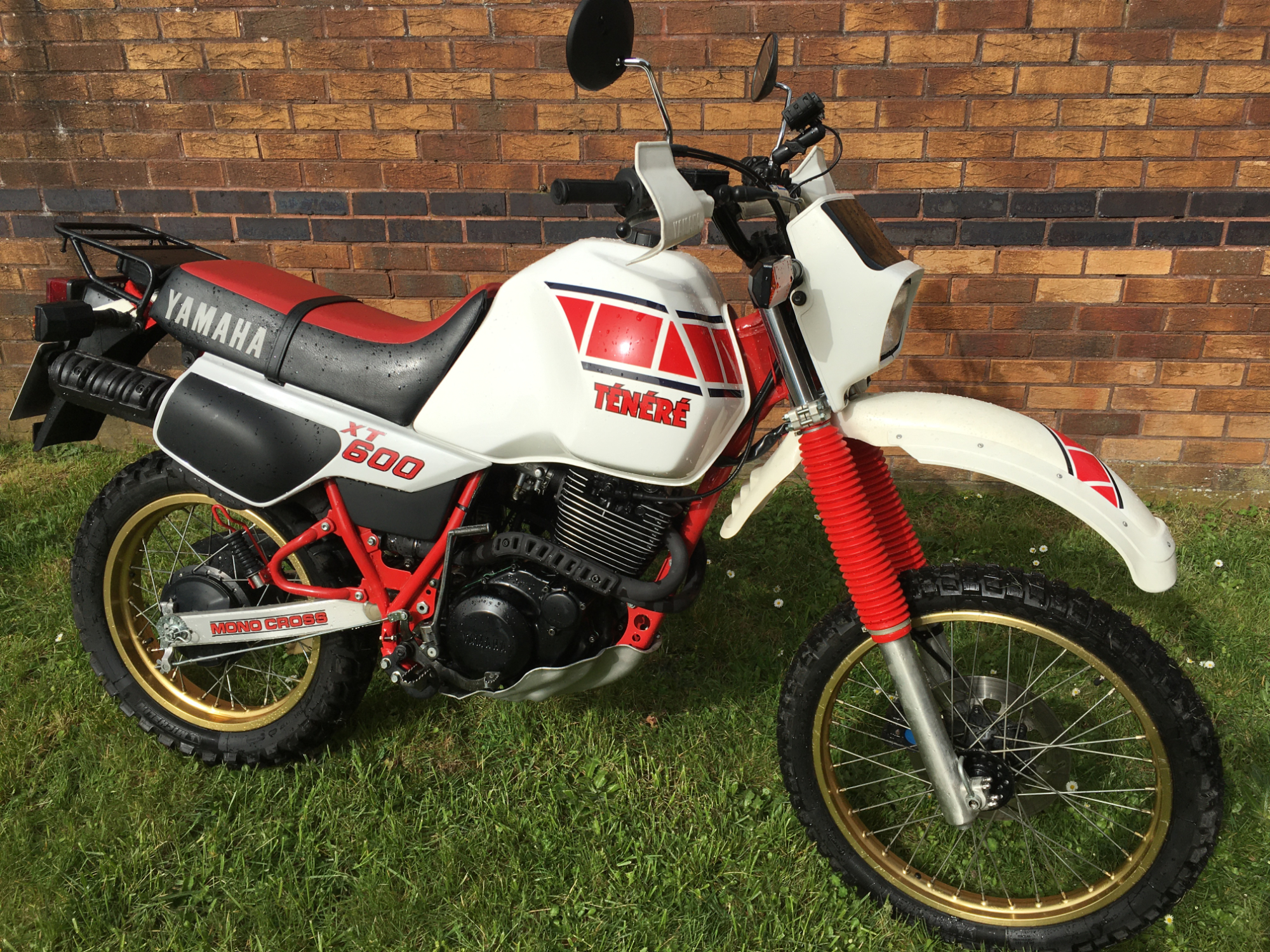
The original 34L version of the XT600Z Ténéré distinguishable by the vertical blocks on the tank.

The Yamaha XT600 is a single-cylinder enduro motorcycle manufactured by Japanese motorcycle manufacturer Yamaha. It was built from 1984 to 2003, in various different versions.

== Model history ==
The XT600 is considered to be an all-purpose Enduro, which is suitable for use on the road as well as off-road driving. Its disc brakes, four-valve engine, mono-shock absorber (Monocross) and contemporary 12-volt electrics represented significant improvements over the 1975 Yamaha XT500 model.

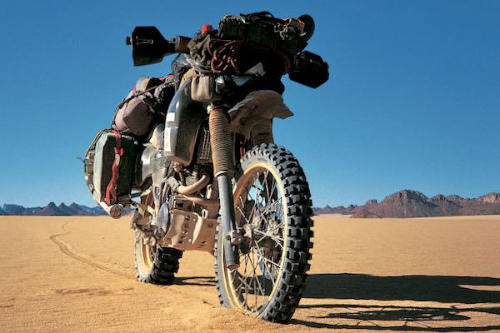
Second generation 1VJ Ténéré in the Sahara. Note the sawn-off mudguard to help cool the vulnerable cylinder head on early 1VJs

The first XT600 was introduced in June 1983: the XT600ZL Ténéré (type 34L), with the Yamaha XT550 engine, kick start only, with a 30-litre tank. In 1984 the basic XT600 was introduced to "replace" the XT550. In addition to the changes in design, the main difference was an 11.5-litre tank instead of the 30-litre long-range 600ZL Ténéré's tank; the road-model Yamaha SRX was released later. In 1991, the somewhat obsolete XT600Z Ténéré was replaced by the water-cooled, five-valve Yamaha XTZ660, which failed to carry on the legendary reputation of its air-cooled predecessors.

Over the years, the XT600 was built in different variants, most of which only differ from one another in appearance. The most important change in the XT600, which had only had a kick start, was in 1990: the XT600E was presented as a new model with a more contemporary design, chrome-plated steel wheel instead of aluminum wheels, now without a tachometer, with the exhaust as a supporting frame member, a 13.9-litre tank (early 3TB models had 13.0 L total capacity tank, with 2 L reserve), and an electric starter. In addition, the oil tank, which was previously located under the left side cover, was moved forward behind the steering head between the frame and girder bridge. Due to high demand, the XT600K, which featured a kick-starter, but was otherwise structurally identical to the XT600E model, was introduced to the market; the series ran until 1995. Due to more stringent emissions requirements, the power of the XT600E, which had become the only available model, was reduced by 4 kW to 29 kW (39 hp), and a tachometer was reintegrated in the cockpit. The clutch actuation on the engine body was moved from the left to the right side, and the muffler was no longer part of the rear frame. The reliability of the XT unit was not reduced, mileages of over 100,000 km without an engine rebuild being not uncommon.

The bike was eventually succeeded by several newer versions, including the XT660R (road-trail), XT660X (motard), and XT660Z Ténéré (adventure). Additionally, it inspired larger models, notably the adventure-styled XTZ750 Super Ténéré and XT1200Z Super Ténéré.

=== Points of interest ===
The 600ZL was known as such because it was a 600Z 34L. However this trend did not continue in the following 55W model of 1984/5, otherwise this could have been known as 600ZW. The easiest way to distinguish a type 34L from the near-identical (but in many small ways superior) 55W, is that the latter has sloping speed blocks on the tank.

== Technical data ==
- Type (serial No.): 34L, etc. (see below)
- Unladen weight:— type 2KF, 1987: 163 kg; type 2KF, 1989: 153 kg
- Fork:— diameter: 41 mm; travel: 255 mm (front), 225 mm (rear; type 2KF rear: 235 mm)
- Engine:—
  - Air-cooled single-cylinder four-stroke, 4-valve engine, orientated vertically
  - Bore: 95 mm
  - Stroke: 84 mm
  - Displacement: 595 cm^{3}
  - Compression ratio: 8.5:1
- Maximum speed: 141–155 km/h (88–96 mph) (depending on model)
- Power: 20 to 34 kW (27–46 hp) (depending on restriction)
- Drive train: 5 gears, chain drive
- Seat height: 860 mm (33.9 in)

== Models ==
Year	Serial number	Designation	Performance
MY 83–84	34L	XT 600 ZL	20 to 33 kW (27–44 hp)
MY 85	55W	XT 600 Z	20 to 33 kW (27–44 hp)
MY 84, 85	47N (Switzerland)	XT 600 Z	
MY 86–87	1VJ	XT 600 Z	20 to 34 kW (27–46 hp)
MY 88–90	3AJ	XT 600 Z	20, 25 & 34 kW (27, 34 & 46 hp)
MY 88–90	3DS (Switzerland)	XT 600 Z	28–32 hp

Year	Serial number	Designation	Performance
MY 84–86	43F	XT 600	20 to 33 kW (27–44 hp)
MY 87–89	2KF	XT 600	33 kW (44 hp)
MY 87–89	2NF	XT 600	limited to 20 kW (27 hp)
MY 90–94	3TB	XT 600 E & K	33 kW (44 hp)
MY 90–94	3UW	XT 600 E & K	limited to 20 kW (27 hp)
MY 95–97	3TB	XT 600 E	25 to 29 kW (34–39 hp)
MY 97–99	VJ01	XT 600 E	25 to 29 kW (34–39 hp)
MY 99–03	DJ02	XT 600 E	25 to 29 kW (34–39 hp)

Designation	Year	Serial number	Intended Market
XT 600 ZL	1983, 84	39E	AUS, EUR
XT 600	1984, 85, 86	43F	USA, CAN, EUR
XT 600	1984, 85, 86	47N	EUR (Switzerland)
XT 600 S, T	1984, 85, 86, 87	49L	USA, AUS
XT 600 N, S, T	1984, 85, 86, 87	49M	USA
XT 600 L, N, S, T	1984, 85, 86, 87	49N	USA
XT 600 NC, LC	1984, 85	49R	USA
XT 600 SC	1986	49R	USA
XT 600 TC	1987	49R	USA
XT 600	1987	2KF	USA, CAN
XT 600 N	1987	2NF	USA, EUR (Germany)
XT 600	1988, 89	2WJ	EUR (Switzerland)
XT 600 U	1988	2WK	USA, CAN
XT 600 U, UC, W, WC	1989, 90	3EW	USA
XT 600	1989	2KF	USA, CAN, EUR
XT 600	1989	2NF	USA, CAN, EUR
XT 600 E	1990, 91, 92, 93, 94	3TB	USA, CAN, EUR, OCE, JPN, OTH
XT 600 EN	1990, 91, 92, 93	3UW	EUR (Germany)
XT 600 E	1990, 91, 92, 93, 94	3UX	USA, CAN, EUR
XT 600 AC	1990	3UY	USA
XT 600 EA	1990	3UY	USA
XT 600 E	1990, 91, 92, 93, 94, 95	3UY	USA
XT 600 BC	1991	3UY	USA
XT 600 D, DC	1992	3UY	USA
XT 600 EE, EC	1993	3UY	USA
XT 600 EA	1990	3WR	USA, CAN
XT 600 EB	1991	3WR	USA, CAN
XT 600 E	1992	3WR	USA, CAN
XT 600 EE	1993	3WR	USA, CAN
XT 600 E	1994, 95, 96, 97, 98, 99, 2000, 01, 02	3WR	OCE, AUS
XT 600 (kickstarter)	1991, 92	3TB	EUR (Spain, France)
XT 600 N (kickstarter)	1991, 92	3UW	EUR (Germany)
XT 600 E	1995, 96, 97, 98	3TB	EUR
XT 600 KH	1993	3TB	USA, CAN, EUR (France)
XT 600 KN	1992	3UW	EUR (Germany)
XT 600 E	1994	3UW	EUR
XT 600 E	1995, 96, 97, 99, 2000, 02	3UX	EUR (Switzerland)
XT 600 E	1996	4MW	Brazil
XT 600	1994	3TB	EUR
XT 600 E	1999, 2000, 01, 02	DJ021	EUR

== Literature ==
- Bucheli Verlags: Yamaha XT 600 Ténéré / XT 600 from year 1983: Manual for care, maintenance and repair ISBN 3-7168-1789-9
- Bucheli Verlags: Yamaha XT 600 E from 1990, ISBN 3-7168-1869-0
- Yamaha Motor Co Ltd, 1st edition Apr 1983: Yamaha ZT600ZL Supplementary Service Manual serial# from 39E000101 Manual# 39E-28197-60
- Yamaha Motor Co Ltd, 1st edition Dec 1983: Yamaha ZT600ZL Supplementary Service Manual serial# from 39E004101 Manual# 53R-28197-20
