= Rayer =

Rayer is a surname. Notable people with this surname include:

- Christian Rayer (born 1945), French motorcycle racer
- Ellie Rayer (born 1996), English field hockey player
- Francis G. Rayer (1921-1981), British science fiction writer
- Mike Rayer (born 1965), Welsh rugby union player
- Pierre François Olive Rayer (1793–1867), French physician
- RSN Rayer (born 1971), Malaysian politician and lawyer

== See also ==
- Rayer Bazaar, Dhaka
