= Nunzio Daniel Coffaro Zuzzolo =

Venezuelan-Italian rally driver

Nunzio Coffaro
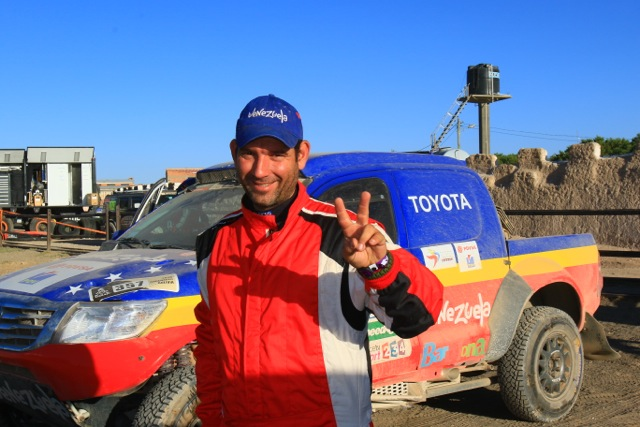
- Nunzio Coffaro at the 2016 Dakar Rally
- Nationality: Venezuela / Italy
- Full name: Nunzio Daniel Coffaro Zuzzolo
- Born: November 29, 1975 (age 50) Maracay, Aragua, Venezuela

Rally Raid / Cross-Country Rally career
- Years active: 2002–present
- Teams: Team Azimut / Go Fast (GWM)

Nunzio Daniel Coffaro Zuzzolo (born 29 November 1975) is a Venezuelan-Italian rally raid driver specializing in cross-country events. He won the 2013 FIA World Cup for Cross-Country Rallies in the T1.1 class. He has regularly represented Venezuela in major international motorsport events, including the Dakar Rally.

== Early life and education ==
Coffaro was born in Maracay, Venezuela, in 1975, into a family of Italian origin. He completed a degree in Mechanical Engineering at the Universidad de Oriente (Anzoátegui Campus) and subsequently worked in the petroleum industry before transitioning to professional off-road racing.

== Career ==
Coffaro began competing in national off-road competitions in Venezuela before progressing to international events. Among his early off-road appearances were the Adventure AWA 4x4, the Outback Challenge in Australia, the Rainforest Challenge in Malaysia, and the Andes Challenge in Ecuador.

=== Dakar Rally and international competition ===
Coffaro is best known for his participation in cross-country rally raids. Driving for Team Azimut, he debuted at the Dakar Rally in 2012, finishing 38th in the general classification. In 2013, he achieved a 20th-place overall finish.

Also in 2013, Coffaro competed in the FIA World Cup for Cross-Country Rallies, securing category results at events including the Baja España Aragón and the Hungarian Baja, securing the T1.1 class title that season. In recognition of this result, he received an award at the 2013 FIA Americas Awards ceremony.

He returned to the Dakar Rally in 2016, finishing 31st in the overall classification. Later that year, he recorded 10th-place finishes at both the Abu Dhabi Desert Challenge and the Silk Way Rally in Russia.

After a hiatus from major international raids, Coffaro returned to cross-country rally in the 2020s. In 2024, he competed in the Rallye du Maroc in the T4 SSV class and won the T4 category at the Rally de Sardegna (3rd overall). In 2025, he finished 2nd overall in the T1+ category at the Artugna Race in Italy. In 2026, he joined Great Wall Motor's (GWM) motorsport program under the Go Fast (GF) structure.

== Results ==
=== Dakar Rally ===
Year	Category	Vehicle	Position
2012	Cars	Toyota	38th
2013	Cars	Toyota	20th
2016	Cars	Toyota	31st

== Key achievements ==
- 2005: 3rd place – Adventure AWA 4x4 Challenge (Venezuela)
- 2009: 2nd place – Outback Extreme 4x4 Challenge (Australia)
- 2011: 1st place – Mud Rally Raid (Colombia)
- 2012: 1st place (T1.2 Category) – 2012 Dakar Rally
- 2013: 1st place (T1.1) & 3rd overall – Sealine Cross-Country Rally (Qatar)
- 2013: 1st place (T1.1) & 5th overall – Baja España Aragón (Spain)
- 2013: 1st place (T1.1) & 3rd overall – Hungarian Baja (Hungary)
- 2013: FIA World Cup for Cross-Country Rallies Champion (T1.1 Category)
- 2014: 1st place (Challenge) & 1st overall – Rally Colombia
- 2016: 31st place overall – 2016 Dakar Rally
- 2016: 10th place overall – Silk Way Rally (Russia)
- 2016: 10th place overall – Abu Dhabi Desert Challenge
- 2024: 8th place (T4 SSV) – Rallye du Maroc (Morocco)
- 2024: 1st place (T4) & 3rd overall – Rally de Sardegna (Italy)
- 2025: 2nd place overall (T1+ Category) – Artugna Race (Italy)
