= Yamaha XT 500 =

Motorcycle

Yamaha XT500
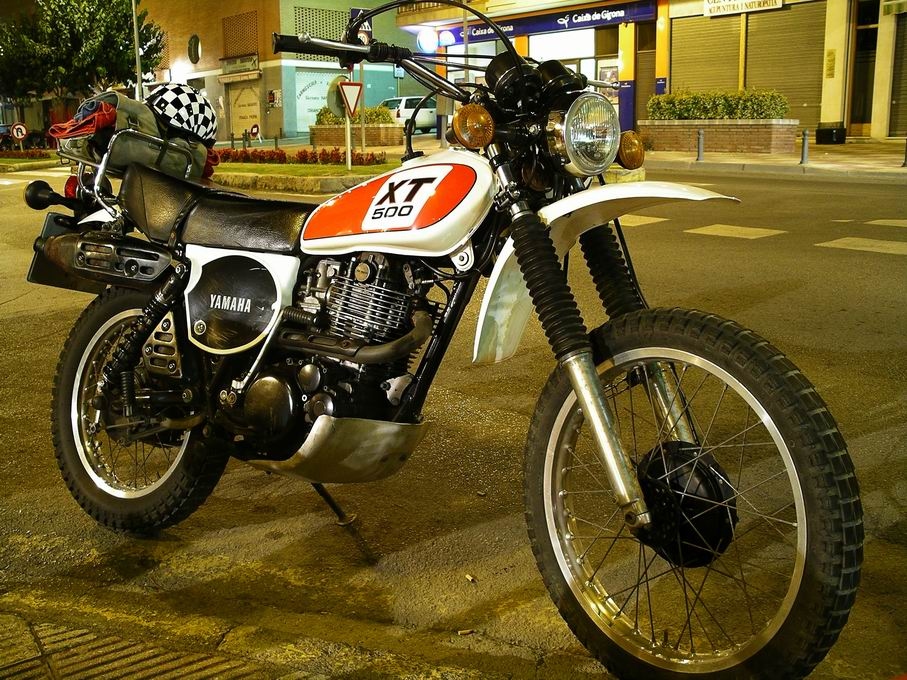
- 1978 Yamaha XT500
- Manufacturer: Yamaha Motor Company
- Also called: TT500 The TT500 and XT500 are two different bikes same engines and frames
- Parent company: Yamaha Corporation
- Production: 1976–1989
- Assembly: Iwata, Shizuoka, Japan
- Predecessor: None
- Successor: XT550/XT600/XT660
- Class: Dual-sport, Enduro (TT500)
- Engine: 499 cc (30.5 cu in) 4-stroke single SOHC
- Bore / stroke: 87 mm × 84 mm (3.4 in × 3.3 in)
- Compression ratio: 9.0:1
- Transmission: Manual 5-speed gearbox
- Frame type: Half-duplex cradle
- Brakes: SLS drum front and rear
- Tires: F: 3.00-21-4PR; R: 4.00-18-4PR
- Wheelbase: 1,420 mm (56 in)
- Dimensions: L: 2,170 mm (85 in); W: 875 mm (34.4 in); H: 1,140 mm (45 in)
- Seat height: 830 mm (33 in)
- Fuel capacity: 8.8 litres (1.9 imperial gallons; 2.3 US gallons)
- Oil capacity: 2.2 litres (2.3 US quarts)
- Turning radius: 2,200 mm (87 in)
- Related: SR500, TT500

The Yamaha XT500 is a twin-valve single-cylinder enduro-adventure motorcycle made by Yamaha from 1975 until 1989. It shares its power plant with the street version SR500 and its off-road brother, the Yamaha TT500. All parts such as the transmission and chassis were produced in Japan.

The first XT 500 was shown at the US dealer convention in September 1975, and in Europe in the summer of 1976. The bike became an instant success and was produced until 1981 when it was replaced by four-valve engines. It laid the ground for the later range of XT bikes ranging from 125 cc (XT125) to the current 660 cc (Yamaha XT660Z Ténéré) and contributed largely to Yamaha's image. In France alone, 62,000 XT 500s were sold from 1976 to 1990.

The XT won the first big African rallies, which were on the rise in the late seventies. It started with Paris–Abidjan-Nice and then the Paris–Dakar Rally, which confirmed the supremacy of the XT 500. Bengt Åberg competed in the 1977 500cc Motocross World Championship on a highly modified Yamaha XT500 built in collaboration with former world champions Torsten Hallman and Sten Lundin. Åberg rode the bike to a victory in the first moto of the 1977 500cc Luxembourg Grand Prix and ended the season ranked 9th in the final world championship standings.

The 21-inch front wheel and the 18-inch rear with enduro-style tires make it fit for both on- and off-road use. Seat height and ground clearance are adequate and the machine has the typical dual-purpose handling characteristics, which makes it suitable for a wide range of duties, from crossing rough city roads to country lanes or paths.

The XT range debuted in 1976 with the XT500 four-stroke single. Later, other models followed, spreading from XT125 to the latest XT660. Both the XT and TT ranges represent the typical Yamaha model development consistency, with model refinements over a long period of time.

After 1982 the successive four-valve XT600s were sold in some markets in 500 cc form until 1989, but this was not the original, classic twin-valve XT500.
