= Alain Génestier =

French rally driver

- Nationality: French
- Born: c. 1948

Championship titles
- 1979: Dakar Rally - Cars class

Alain Génestier (born c. 1948) is a former professional rally driver from France. He was the winner of the first Dakar Rally in the cars class (fourth overall) in 1979.

== Dakar Rally ==
Year	Category	Team	Vehicle	Rank
1979	Cars	(France) Joseph Terbiat (France) Jean Lemordant	Range Rover V8	1st

Sporting positions
Preceded by None	Dakar Rally; Car Winner; 1979	Succeeded by Freddy Kottulinsky
