= Éric Breton =

French composer, pianist and conductor

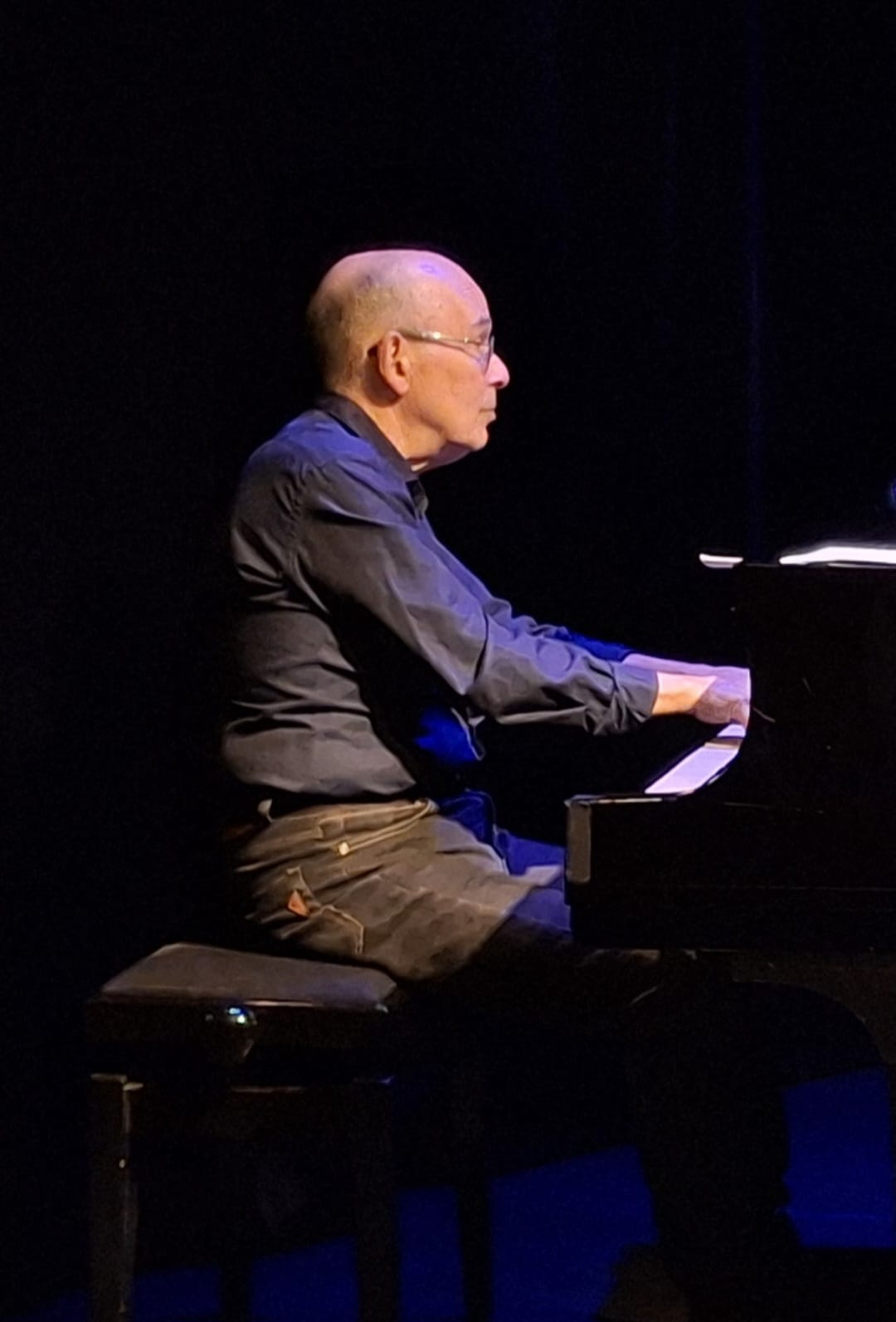
Éric Breton

Éric Breton (born 1954 in Avignon) is a French composer, pianist and conductor. His catalogue includes orchestral and instrumental music, works for piano, song cycles, sacred music, cantatas, incidental music and opera.

== Biography ==
Breton was born in Avignon, where he studied piano, harmony and counterpoint. He studied piano with Hélène Varszegi, composition and orchestration with Ivan Jullien, and conducting with Ernst Schelle. His musical activity has combined composition with work as a pianist and conductor.

In 1994, he was appointed Ambassador of Art and Culture of the city of Avignon and became an honorary member of the Sarajevo Philharmonic Orchestra. In 1996, he received the Sloboda Award for the Defence of Human Rights and Humanism in Bosnia and Herzegovina.

The human voice occupies a central place in Breton's output. He has composed more than one hundred songs on texts by writers including Petrarch, Victor Hugo, Pablo Neruda, Frédéric Mistral and Christian Bobin. His stage works frequently combine literary subjects with spiritual, social and environmental themes.

== Music and stage works ==
Breton's catalogue ranges from solo and chamber music to vocal and theatrical works. Among his instrumental compositions are Mes années de pèlerinage for piano and Farces et attrapes for trumpet, trombone, vibraphone and marimba. He also composed music for Gérard Vantaggioli's play Les Petits Adieux, presented at the Théâtre du Chien qui Fume in Avignon, and a setting of Jean de La Fontaine's fables for children's choir and mixed wind quintet.

His vocal works include Poèmes espagnols, a song cycle performed by soprano Lydia Mayo with Breton at the piano, and the sacred composition Messe d'Avignon (2003).

=== Le Messie du peuple chauve ===
Le Messie du peuple chauve is an opera with a libretto by Breton, based on the novel by Augustin Billetdoux. Its protagonist, Simon, is a young man affected by alopecia who interprets his condition as part of a wider ecological crisis, establishing a parallel between human baldness, deforestation and the destruction of biodiversity. The work was given its world première at the Opéra Confluence of the Opéra Grand Avignon on 20 November 2020.

Reviewing the première, Irma Foletti described Breton's music as approachable and predominantly tonal, noting its contrasting atmospheres and references to musical theatre, Francis Poulenc, Claude Debussy, Philip Glass and John Adams. She considered the final part of the opera particularly effective in its use of brass, percussion, English horn and choral writing. Christian Wasselin, writing in Opéra Magazine, characterised the score as frankly tonal and primarily concerned with emotion and meditative atmosphere, describing the work as a “noble lament”.

=== Le Soleil et les autres étoiles ===
Le Soleil et les autres étoiles, opéra with libretto and music by Eric Breton, was inspired by the murder of the monks of Tibhirine in 1996. The dramatic action is deliberately placed outside a precisely identified country, period or religion. Set in an isolated monastery threatened by violence, it examines faith, fear, fraternity, sacrifice and spiritual freedom.

The title refers to the final verse of Dante Alighieri's Divine Comedy. A concert version was presented in Avignon in October 2025 by the Chorus of the Opéra Grand Avignon, conducted by Alan Woodbridge, in a collaboration between the Opéra Grand Avignon and Musique Sacrée en Avignon.

=== L'Incantatore ===
L'Incantatore (2024) is a dramatic poem by the Italian dramatist and musicologist Natalia Di Bartolo, with original music by Breton, written for spoken voice, soprano and piano. Di Bartolo conceived it as an autonomous theatrical text in blank hendecasyllables and wrote it for actor and director Simon Domenico Migliorini. Breton subsequently composed a score in dialogue with the poem, while preserving the literary and dramaturgical autonomy of the spoken text.

The central character is Theatre itself, personified as an ancient, wounded and seductive figure reflecting upon its history, its powers and the danger of its disappearance. The soprano character Zoe, whose name means “life” in Greek, is the sung counterpart to the spoken protagonist. The work is therefore structured through the interaction of dramatic speech, song and live piano music.

The world première took place on 26 July 2024 during the 22nd Festival Internazionale Teatro Romano Volterra, in the archaeological setting of the Roman Theatre of Volterra. Migliorini directed the production and performed the title role; Breton played the piano and performed his own score; the Franco-Spanish soprano Lydia Mayo sang the role of Zoe; and Eleonora Ferrari appeared as dancer. The production resulted from a collaboration developed between Di Bartolo in Sicily, Migliorini and the Volterra Festival in Tuscany, and Breton and Mayo in France.

The Volterra production was subsequently brought to Breton's native city of Avignon. It was performed on 12 October 2025 in the historic auditorium of the Théâtre du Chien qui Fume during the ninth Semaine Italienne – Bella Italia, a Franco-Italian cultural event promoted by the Grand Avignon and the City of Avignon in collaboration with Italian cultural institutions. The performance retained Migliorini as director and spoken-voice performer, Breton as composer and pianist, and Mayo as Zoe.

French reviews emphasised the relationship between poetic language and Breton's restrained musical contribution. Jean-Pierre Bacot and Jean-Marie Cabot described the production as a hybrid theatrical form in which spoken voice, soprano and piano confront and complement one another, stressing the delicacy of Breton's music and the primacy of the poetic text. Marguerite Romeuf praised the originality of Di Bartolo's dramatic conception and the formal discipline of the hendecasyllabic verse, while describing Breton's music as continuously present but discreet enough to leave the spoken and sung protagonists at the centre of the performance.

== Selected works ==
- Poèmes espagnols, song cycle
- Messe d'Avignon (2003)
- Mes années de pèlerinage, for piano
- Farces et attrapes, for trumpet, trombone, vibraphone and marimba
- Les Fables de La Fontaine, for children's choir and mixed wind quintet
- Les Petits Adieux, incidental music
- Le Messie du peuple chauve, opera
- Le Soleil et les autres étoiles, opera
- L'Incantatore (2024), dramatic poem by Natalia Di Bartolo with original music by Breton
