= Patrick Chapuis =

French photographer (1949–2021)

- Born: 3 September 1949; Toulouse, France
- Died: 13 January 2021 (aged 71); Paris, France
- Occupation: Photographer

Patrick Chapuis (3 September 1949 – 13 January 2021) was a French photographer.

== Biography ==
Chapuis spent his childhood living in Gabon. His father was an astronomic photographer. While attending secondary school in Toulouse, he became friends with Claude Nori, who would go on to found the photo gallery and publishing house Contrejour. Chapuis studied photography at the École technique de photo de Toulouse, where he was a student of Jean Dieuzaide, and at the École nationale supérieure des arts décoratifs. He made his debut as a reporter-photographer in Iraq in 1984. His reports on the Kurds were published exclusively in Paris Match.

Since 1987, Chapuis has published numerous reports on Ancient Egypt and became an official photographer for the Louvre museum and of the French mission of the Bubasteum.

Other photographic reports Chapuis has published have appeared in GEO, National Geographic, Le Figaro Magazine, Science & Vie, Stern, Science, and others.

Patrick Chapuis died in Paris on 13 January 2021 at the age of 71.

== Publications ==
- Les Tombeaux retrouvés de Sakkara (2003)
- Le Labyrinthe des pyramides (2011)
- Mastabas de l’Egypte ancienne (2012)
- Intenses cités (2016)
