= Freddy Kottulinsky =

German-Swedish racing and rallying driver (1932–2010)

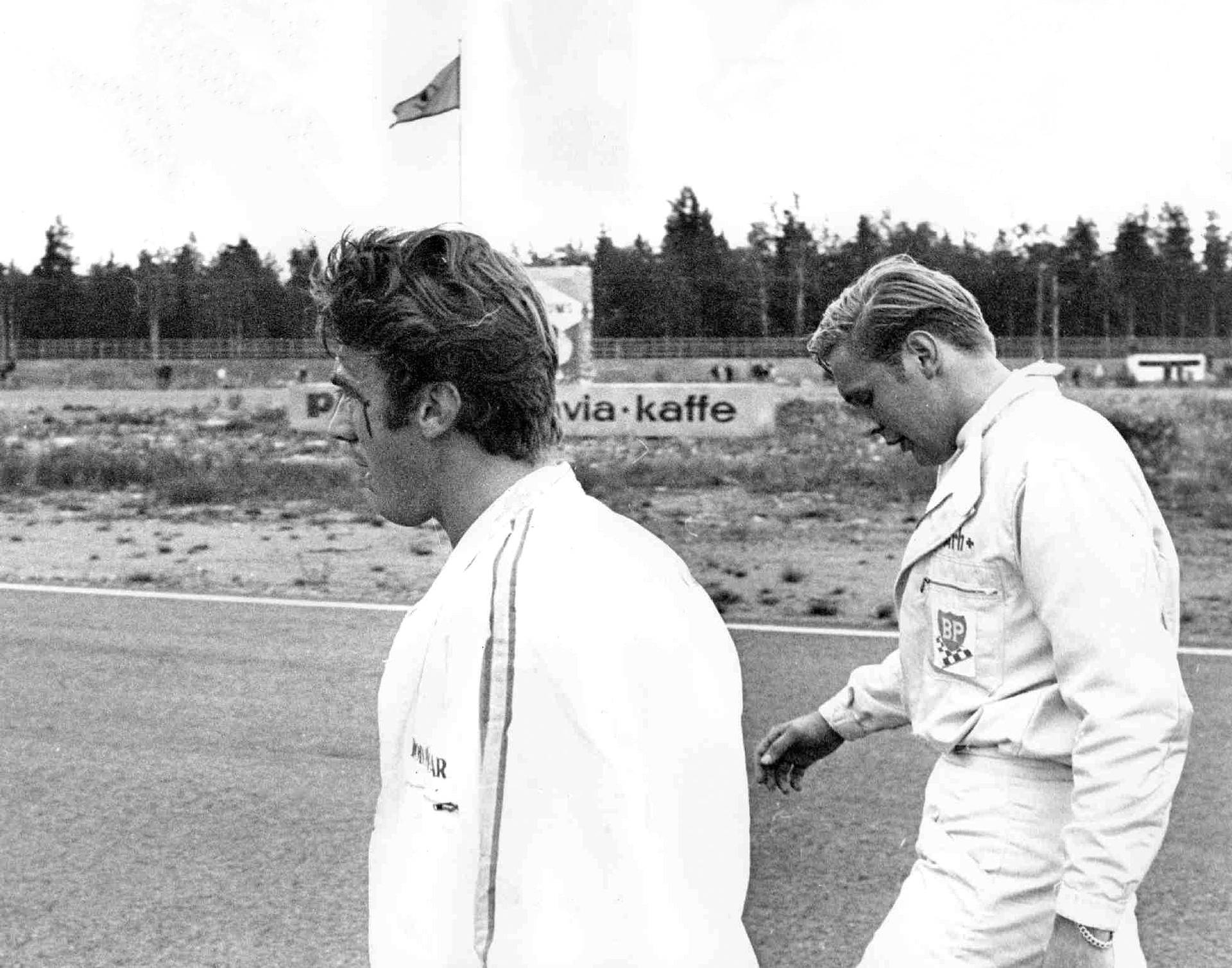
Freddy Kottulinsky (left) and the Finnish driver Matti Lamminen in Keimola, Finland, 1968, after their Formula Three vehicles had collided.

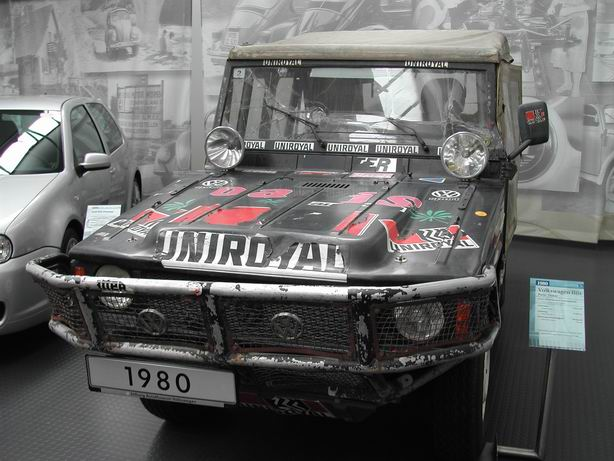
Dakar Rally winner of 1980

Winfried Philippe Adalbert Karl Graf Kottulinsky Freiherr von Kottulin, better known as Freddy Kottulinsky (20 July 1932 – 4 May 2010), was a German-Swedish racing and rallying driver who won the Paris-Dakar Rally in 1980. He was born in Munich.

== Biography ==
A member of an old Austrian-Silesian noble family, he was born on 20 July 1932, the son of Count Adalbert Kottulinsky von Kottulin (b. 1904) and his wife, Countess Maria Schenk von Stauffenberg (1905-1940). In 1953, he went to Sweden, where he set up a repair shop. In the 1960s, and mostly with a Swedish racing licence, Kottulinsky competed in Formula 3, Formula Vee and Formula 2. In F3 he became Swedish champion in 1966 on a Lotus 35 Cosworth. Together with Ronnie Peterson and Torsten Palm he in 1970 scored a Swedish win in the F3 European Cup for nations. In 1974, he won Formel Super V's European Gold Cup on a Lola T320.

He also entered rallies, as did his daughter Susanne Kottulinsky who had been born in 1960. His granddaughter Mikaela Åhlin-Kottulinsky is also a racing driver in Audi Sport TT Cup. In 1980, he won the Paris-Dakar Rally together with Gerd Löffelmann in a 4WD VW Iltis prepared by Audi. When asked for the first time to drive one of three cars that were supposed to support Jean Ragnotti, Kottulinsky, who had neither experience nor desire to race in a desert, declined indirectly by asking for a high salary. Shortly before the race began, the team hired him anyway, and Kottulinsky entered the race with hardly any preparation. He did not have tent nor sleeping bag, but enough spare parts to keep the car running without having to wait for support. The design of this four wheel drive system provided the basis for Audi's Quattro system, which debuted later in 1980 on the original Audi Quattro. In that time, Kottulinsky also trained the mechanics to drive the team's service vehicles quickly and safely. This developed into Audi Fahrsicherheitstraining (driving safety lessons), for which Kottulinsky worked 25 years until retirement.

Kottulinsky lived in Görkwitz in Thüringen for several years, promoting the local race track Schleizer Dreieck. At over 70 years of age, he was still entering motorsport events, e.g. on 11 August 2006 with a Datsun 240Z in the AvD-Historic-Marathon-400 on the Nordschleife of the Nürburgring. He died on 4 May 2010 in Karlstad.

== Racing record ==
=== Complete European Formula Two Championship results ===
(key) (Races in bold indicate pole position; races in italics indicate fastest lap)

Year	Entrant	Chassis	Engine	1	2	3	4	5	6	7	8	9	10	11	12	13	14	Pos.	Pts
1975	Fritz Lochmann Racing	Ralt RT1	BMW	EST	THR	HOC	NÜR	PAU	HOC	SAL	ROU	MUG	PER	SIL	ZOL	NOG	VAL; DNQ	NC	0
1976	Fritz Lochmann Racing	Ralt RT1	BMW	HOC	THR; NC	VAL; DNQ	SAL; 7	PAU; 8	HOC; DNQ	ROU; Ret	MUG; Ret	PER; Ret	EST; 17	NOG; 11	HOC; NC			17th	1
1977	Fritz Lochmann Racing	Ralt RT1	BMW	SIL; 8	THR; Ret	HOC; Ret	NÜR; 10	VAL; 15	PAU; 13	MUG; 10	ROU; 8	NOG; Ret	PER; 9	MIS; Ret	EST; 7	DON		NC	0

=== Complete Deutsche Tourenwagen Meisterschaft results ===
(key) (Races in bold indicate pole position) (Races in italics indicate fastest lap)

Year	Team	Car	1	2	3	4	5	6	7	8	9	Pos.	Pts
1986		Audi 200 Quattro	ZOL	HOC	NÜR	AVU; DNS	MFA; Ret	WUN	NÜR; 18	ZOL	NÜR	40th	1

Sporting positions
Preceded by Alain Génestier	Dakar Rally; Car Winner; 1980	Succeeded by René Metge
