= Sinpar =

Defunct French automobile and manufacturer

- Industry: Automotive
- Founded: 1907, 1946
- Founder: Léon Demeester
- Defunct: 1980
- Fate: Taken over by Renault in 1980
- Headquarters: Courbevoie, France
- Products: Off-road and sports cars

Sinpar was a French automobile company which was originally founded in 1907 and then restarted in 1946 by Léon Demeester. Prior to World War I, the company built voiturettes, while the post-war iteration specialized in off-road vehicles.

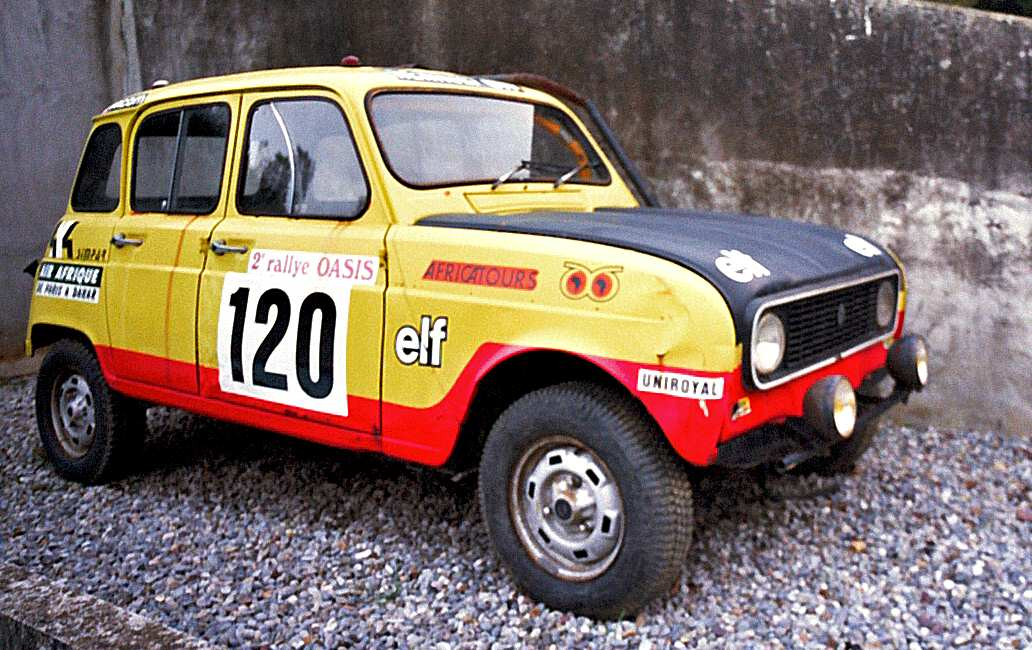
Four-wheel drive Renault 4 Sinpar from the 1980 Paris-Dakar Rally

== Pre-war ==
The Sinpar was originally a French automobile manufactured from 1907 until 1914. The company built de Dion-Bouton-engined voiturettes in Courbevoie; cars used either 4½ CV or 8 CV power units. An 8 CV four seat car produced from 1912 until 1914 was identical with the 8 CV Demeester.

The name "Sinpar" was derived from the Latin sine par, meaning "without equal".

== Interwar ==
Between the wars, the Sinpar shops engaged in extending and reinforcing truck chassis, mostly Fords and Citroëns. They also sold other kits and parts such as upgraded axles, reduction, and overdrive gear kits.

== After 1946 ==
After operations ceased during World War II, Léon Demeester, who had established the business back in 1907, together with his son Pierre restarted the company in 1946. Sinpar then engaged in manufacturing winches and heavy-duty transmission sub-assemblies for four- and six-wheel drive trucks. In the fifties Sinpar expanded into manufacturing oil field trucks. In the 1960s Sinpar also sold around 150 four-wheel drive trucks under its own brand. Called the Sinpar Castor, they used the cabin and many other parts from the Renault Estafette. These specialist items were provided to a range of industrial companies in France until 1975 when Saviem took over the company's activities.

Another source refers to Sinpar Appareils S.A. in Colombes, using the Sinpar make for cars from 1964 until approximately 1974. The Eidgenössische Typenprüfungskommission from Switzerland listed it as Appareils Sinpar from Colombes in 1973.

In autumn 1962, Sinpar launched an all-terrain derivative of the Renault 4. Initially fitted with a three-speed transmission—with the Renault 3's shorter gearing—it was only available with the larger, 845 cc 800-01 engine. An extra short first gear was also offered, for even better climbing abilities. The cost of the conversion was nearly two thirds the price of a new Renault 4, limiting sales mainly to institutional users.

During the later 1960s, the business increasingly focused on four-wheel drive conversions for various Renault models, notably the Renault Goélette, the vans mostly being destined for service with the French army, along with the Renault 4, Renault Rodéo, Renault 6, and the Renault 12. Although most of the cars were sold in France, larger sales volumes were also achieved in the more mountainous regions of Switzerland, where there was significant customer demand for reasonably priced four-wheel drive cars, which auto-makers were disinclined to address until the European arrival of the Subaru. A Sinpar-prepared Renault 4 finished third in the 1980 Paris–Dakar Rally, after having finished fifth the year before. A Sinpar Renault 12 break with a Gordini-prepped engine finished third in the Rallye Côte-Côte (from the Côte d'Ivoire to the Côte d'Azur). Two Renault 12 Sinpar 1800 took part in next year's Rallye Côte-Côte as well, finishing first and eleventh. Sinpar also manufactured the beach car version of the Renault 4, the "Plein Air."

In the 1960s and 1970s, Sinpar also showed some of their own chassis. In 1962, they showed an all-wheel-drive chassis with fully independent, torsion bar suspension, fitted with the Ford 6D engine from the Thames Trader. In 1968 Sinpar designed the Torpedo S, a jeep-style car with body by Brissonneau and Lotz, which did not enter production. In the early 1970s Sinpar expanded by taking over Carrosserie Rotrou's plant in Verneuil-sur-Avre.

Together with the company's German agent, Rau GmbH of Stuttgart, Sinpar also helped develop a four-wheel-drive version of the Ford Transit in 1982. Reflecting the companies involved, it was called the SIRA-Ford Transit.

After the 1976 death of Pierre Demeester, the company's future was uncertain. In 1980, Renault took over the company, which continued to produce modified all-terrain Renault-based vehicles at Chassieu. The new, Renault-owned business was still called "Sinpar", but was turned into a backronym which stood for "Société Industrielle de Production et d'Adaptations Rhodanienne" instead.

In 1998, the company was fully subsumed into Renault V.I. and the Sinpar name retired.
