= Yamaha XT550 =

Motorcycle built by Yamaha

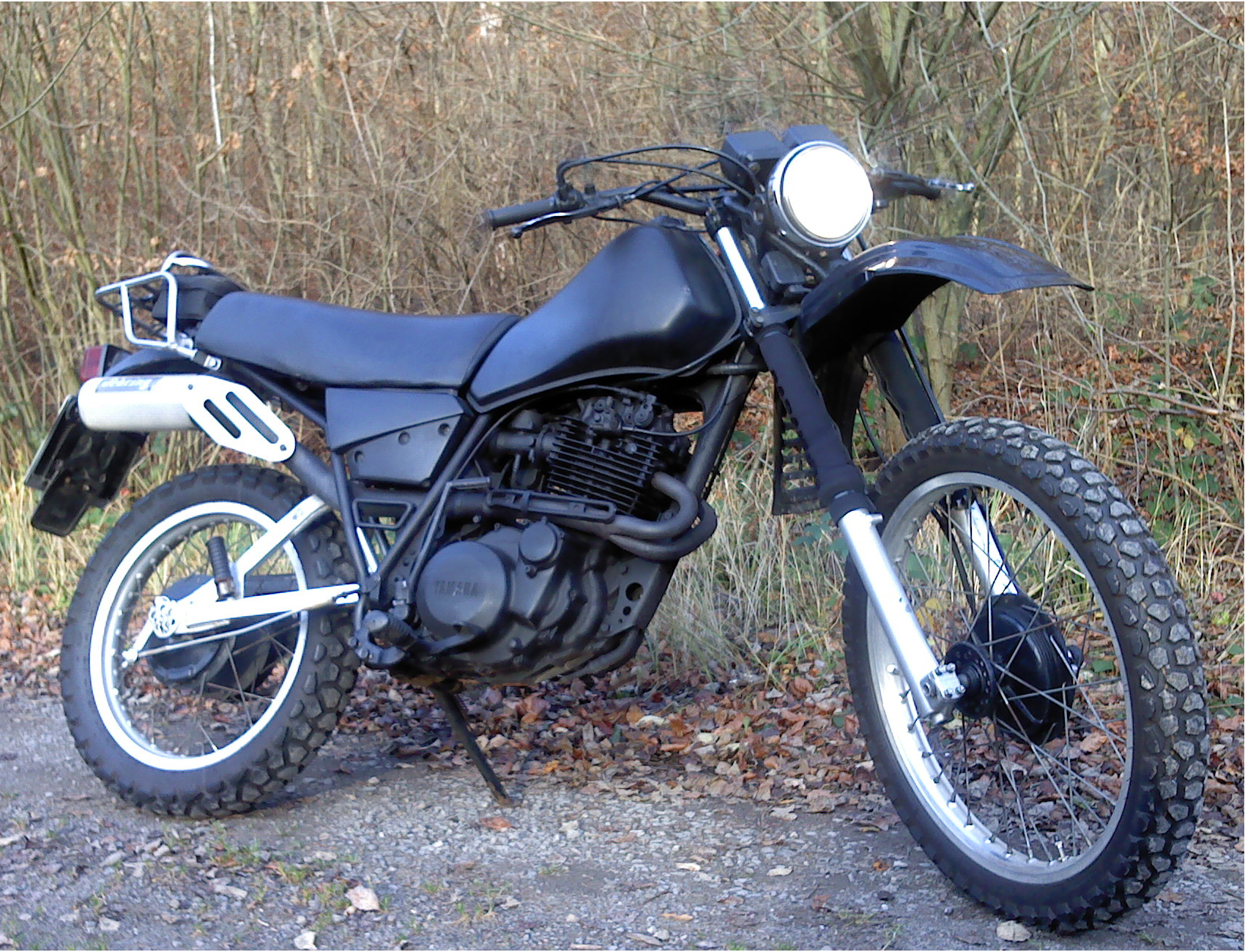
XT550

The Yamaha XT 550 was a motorcycle produced in Japan by the Yamaha Motor Company in 1982 and 1983

XT 550 had an innovative gas tank design, single overhead camshaft, four valves, monoshock rear suspension, and – a first on a motorcycle – a two-stage YDIS intake system. The XT 550 engine was a replacement.

The XT 550 could easily reach 95 mph (152 km/h).

XT 550 has standard motorcycle features: it has a high-mounted front fender, a small round headlight, a two-piece dual seat, a high-mounted exhaust system, an engine plate, and wire-spoke wheels with off-road tires.
