= Honda XL250 =

Motorcycle

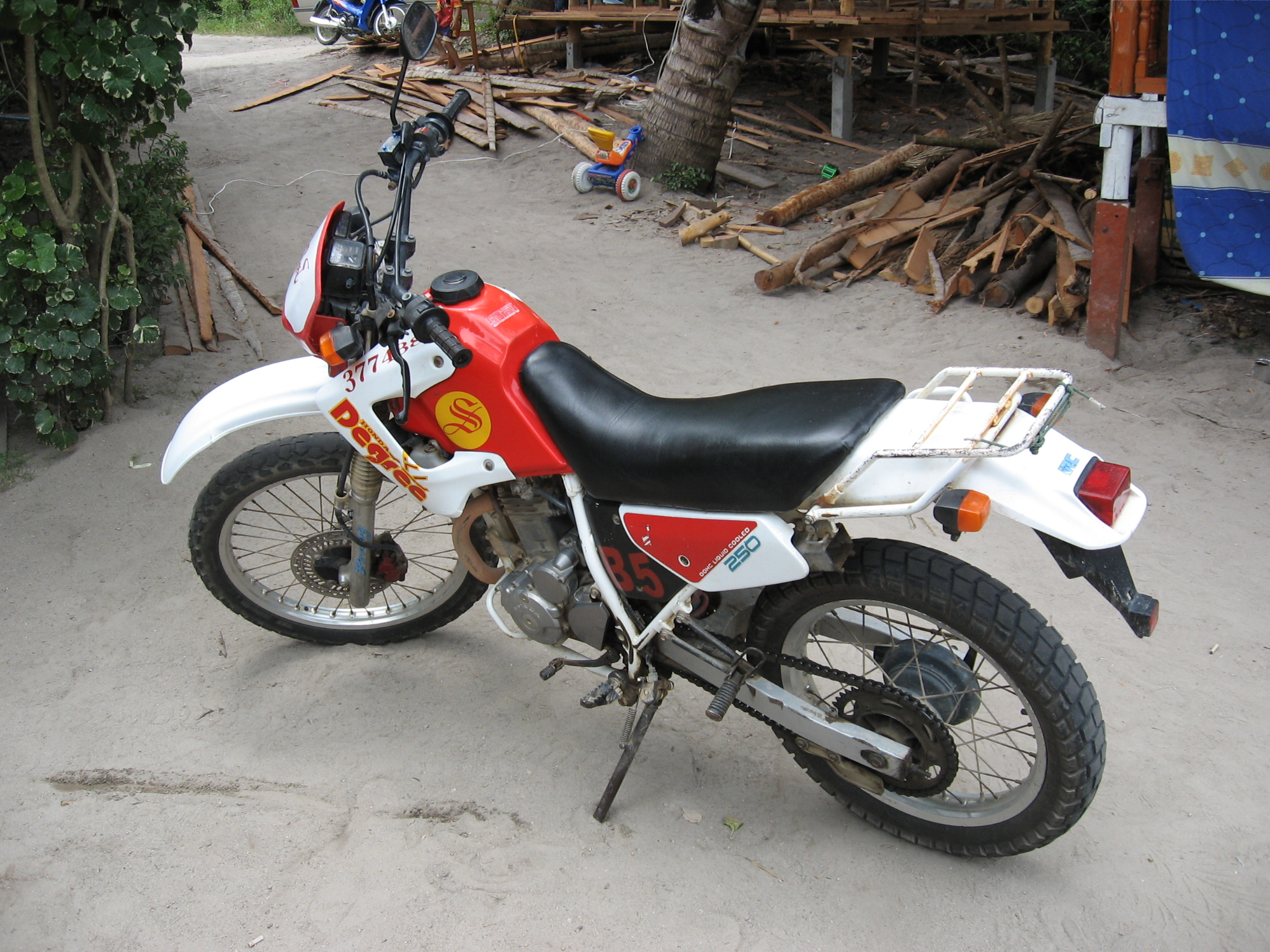
A Honda XL250 Degree from the 1990s

Honda XL250 is a four-stroke 250 cc (15 cu in) motorcycle from Honda introduced in 1972, and manufactured through most of the 1980s. When it appeared it was the first modern four-stroke enduro motorcycle and the first mass-produced four-valve motorcycle. (The first four-valve single was the Ricardo Triumph four-valve of the 1920s, and the first four-valve engine was the Indian 8-valve V2 racer of 1911.)

The XL250, and the later XL350, laid the groundwork for the revolutionary big modern four-stroke-enduro wave.

The XL250 is an "enduro" or dual-sport bike meaning it physically looks like a dirt bike, and shares many characteristics with a dirt bike, but it is street-legal and intended for on- and off-road use. The bike is completely mechanically operated as there are no hydraulics on the bike. The 250cc 4-stroke motor produced 20 horsepower. The bike weighs 288 lbs with oil, grease, and petrol. Fuel capacity is 2.4 gallons (9.5 litres). Demand for this model has remained high among collectors and enthusiasts. An interesting observation with the XL250s models was their narrow streamlining, being only 12 inches at their widest point excluding the handlebars.

The 1980 XL250 introduced few changes, however during its production the rear chain tensioner was added.

The 1981 XL250S was the last year to have the unique 23-inch front wheel, rear twin shock, and 6-volt electrical system. It also had upgraded rear brakes in a larger hub and a modified 5 plate clutch, and handsome twin speedo and tacho gauges in the Australian, continental variants. In 1982, the engine had the balancing shaft gear driven rather than chain driven making the engine quieter and a six-speed gearbox was introduced as well as an automatic cam chain tensioner. In 1982, Honda reverted to the 21-inch front wheel and introduced the rear single shock suspension, known as the Pro-Link, and a 12-volt electrical system. The 1984–1987 models were equipped with dual, progressively operated carburetors, (the left one opened 1/4-1/2 way before the right one opened and both reached full throttle together), and the short stroke variant of the RFVC type engine.

1987 marked the final year of the XL250R and XL600R for the USA. The XL series were replaced with the short-lived NX250 in 1988–1990. In 1992, Honda began the XR250L and XR650L, which are street legal and closely follow the roots of the XL series.

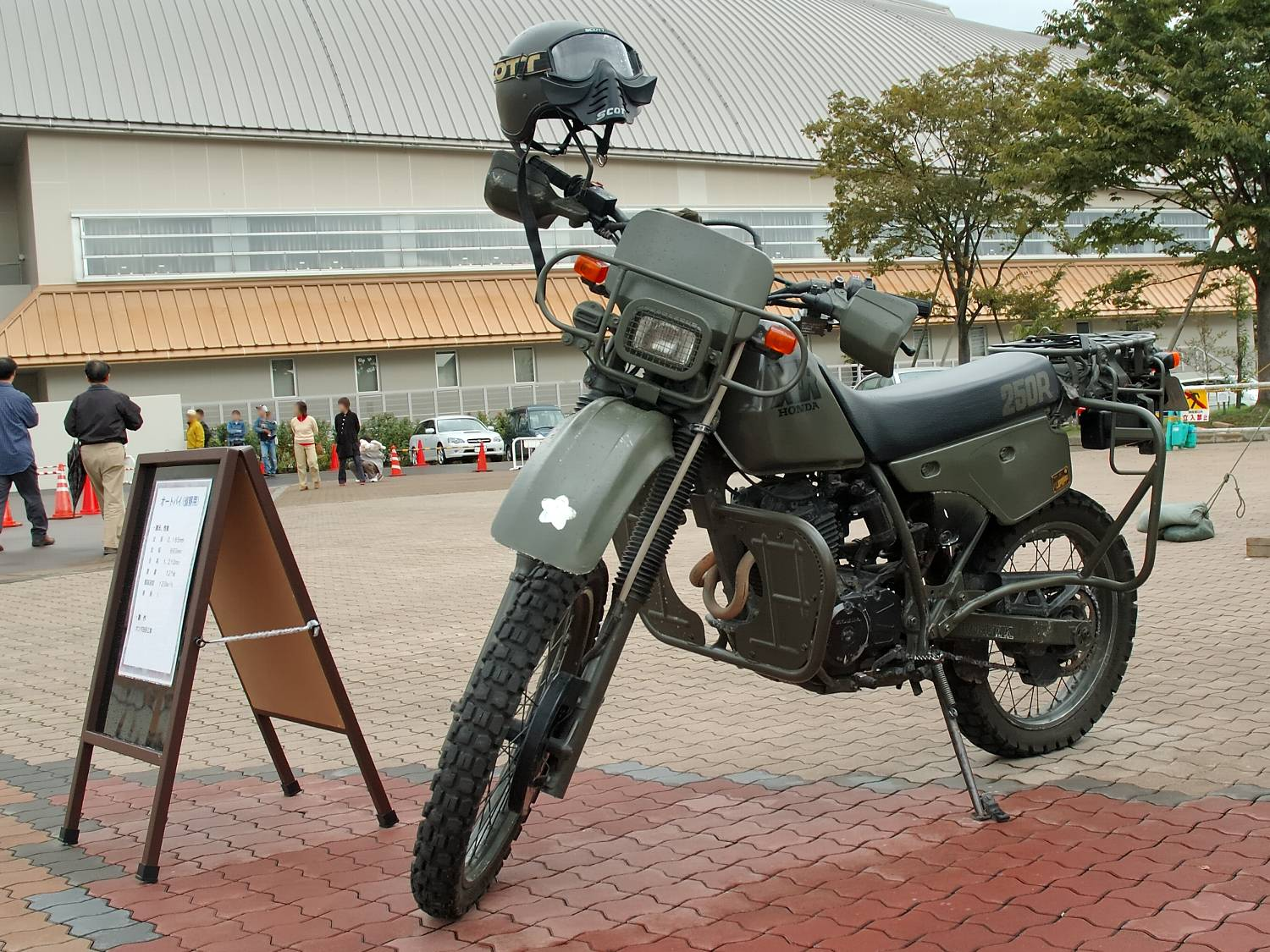
The military version for Japan army
