= Hubert Auriol =

French racing driver (1952–2021)

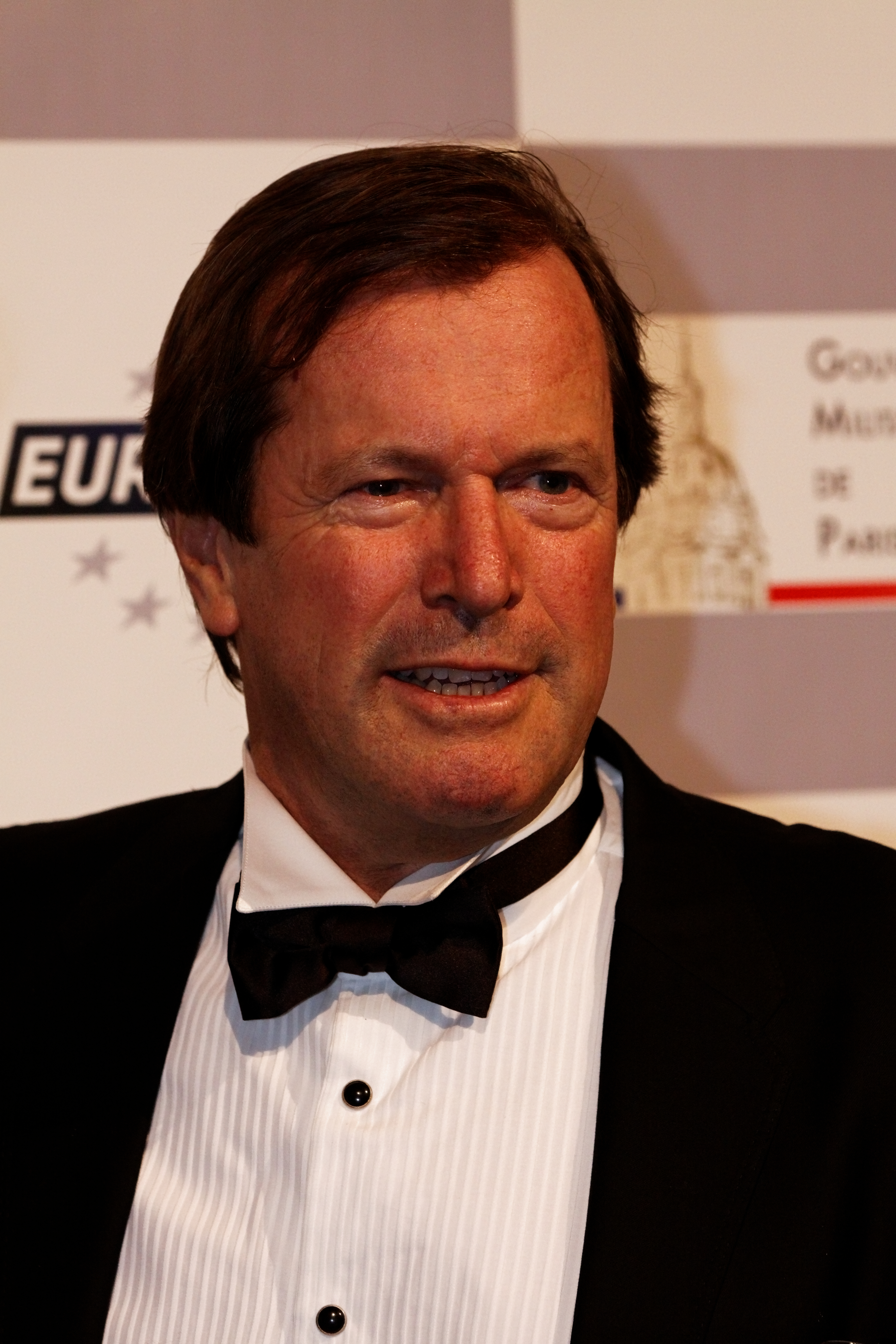
Auriol in 2012

Hubert Elisée Maurice Philippe Auriol (French: [ybɛʁ oʁjɔl]; 7 June 1952 – 10 January 2021) was a French professional off-road motorcyclist and auto racer competing in rally raid events. After retiring as a competitor, he served as the director of The Paris-Dakar rally. Auriol is notable for being the first competitor to win the Dakar rally on motorcycles and in automobiles. In 2012, Auriol was named an FIM Legend for his motorcycling achievements.

== Career ==
Auriol was born in Addis Abeba, Ethiopia, and began competing in motocross and enduro events in 1973. From 1979 to 1994, he took part in The Paris-Dakar rally, taking part in the first nine events on a motorcycle and the remaining seven in a car. On motorcycles, he won the event in 1981 and 1983 on a BMW R80G/S entered by BMW France, finishing in second in 1984. He broke both ankles on the penultimate day of the 1987 edition, while he was in the lead. He wrote a book with the French journalist Jean-Michel Caradec'h, "Paris Dakar. Une histoire d'hommes" about this story. Auriol then switched to the automobile class in 1988, first racing a factory-backed Mitsubishi Pajero Proto T3, but after losing the event to Ari Vatanen in 1990, switched to the Citroën team, winning in 1992 with a ZX Rallye Raid, co-driven by Philippe Monnet.

In 1994, Auriol joined Dakar organizer ASO and became race director of the event he won three times, starting in the 1995 edition. He headed the event until the 2004 edition, when he was replaced by Patrick Zaniroli. In 2008, he founded the Africa Eco Race.

Auriol lived in Suresnes with his wife and three children. He was not related to former World Rally Champion Didier Auriol.

== Death ==
Auriol, who had been suffering from cardiovascular disease for a long time, was hospitalized in serious condition after being infected by COVID-19 in Paris in November 2020, during the COVID-19 pandemic in France. While undergoing treatment for COVID-19, he died on 10 January 2021, at the age of 68, following a cardiac arrest.

Sporting positions
Preceded by Cyril Neveu	Dakar Rally; Motorcycle Winner; 1981	Succeeded by Cyril Neveu
Preceded by Cyril Neveu	Dakar Rally; Motorcycle Winner; 1983	Succeeded by Gaston Rahier
Preceded by Ari Vatanen	Dakar Rally; Car Winner; 1992	Succeeded by Bruno Saby
