= Cyril Neveu =

French rally racer (born 1956)

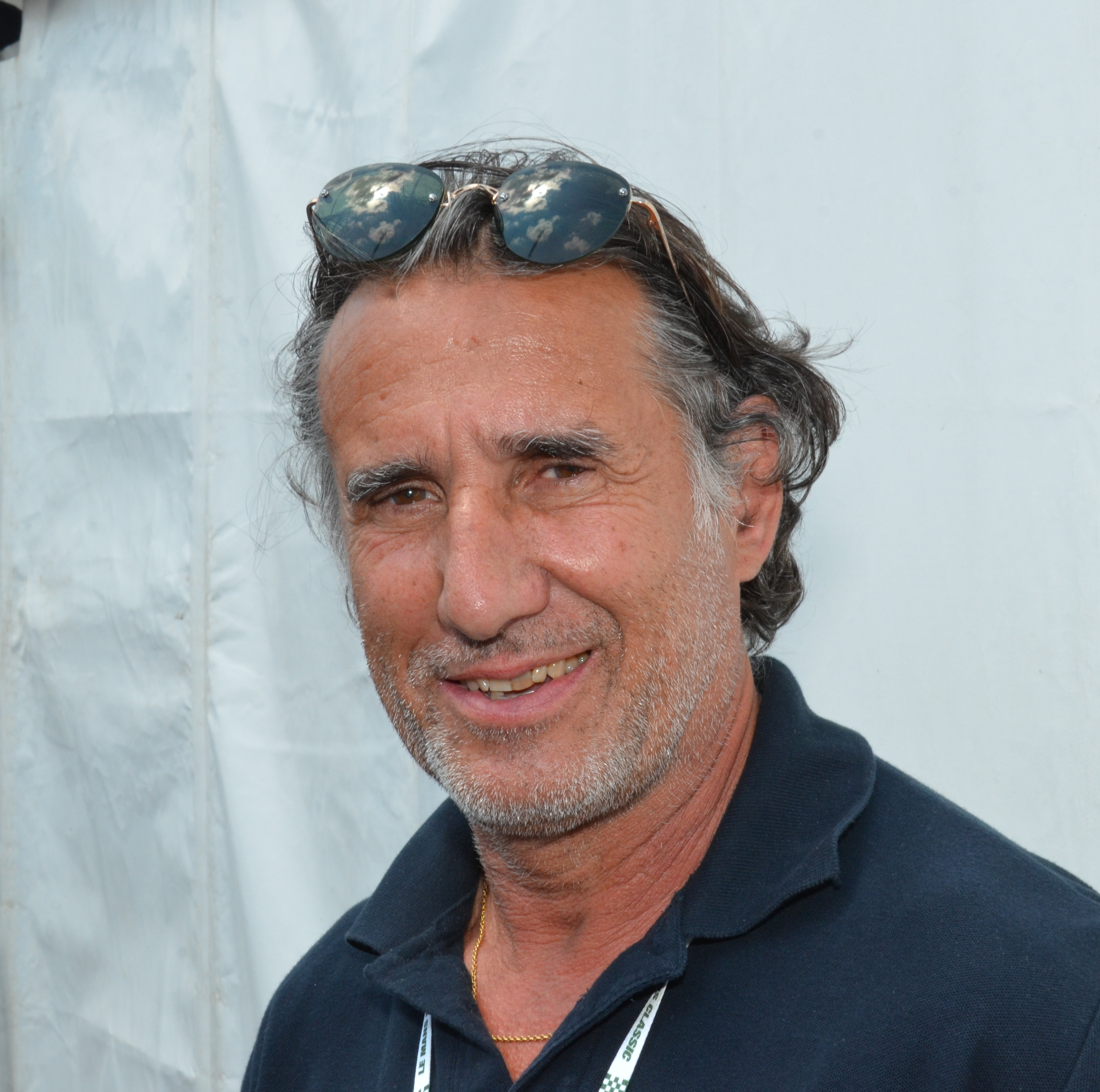
- Nationality: (France) French
- Born: 20 September 1956 (age 68); Orléans, France

Motocross career
- Years active: 1970s/1980s
- Grands Prix: Dakar Rally
- Wins: 5

Cyril Neveu (born 20 September 1956 in Orléans, France) is a French former professional motocross, enduro and rally raid racer. He is notable for winning the motorcycle division of the Dakar Rally five times in 1979, 1980, 1982, 1986, and 1987. He was the first competitor to win the Dakar Rally in the motorcycle category in 1979. In 2013, Neveu was named an FIM Legend for his motorcycling achievements.
