= Christian Rayer =

French motorcycle racer

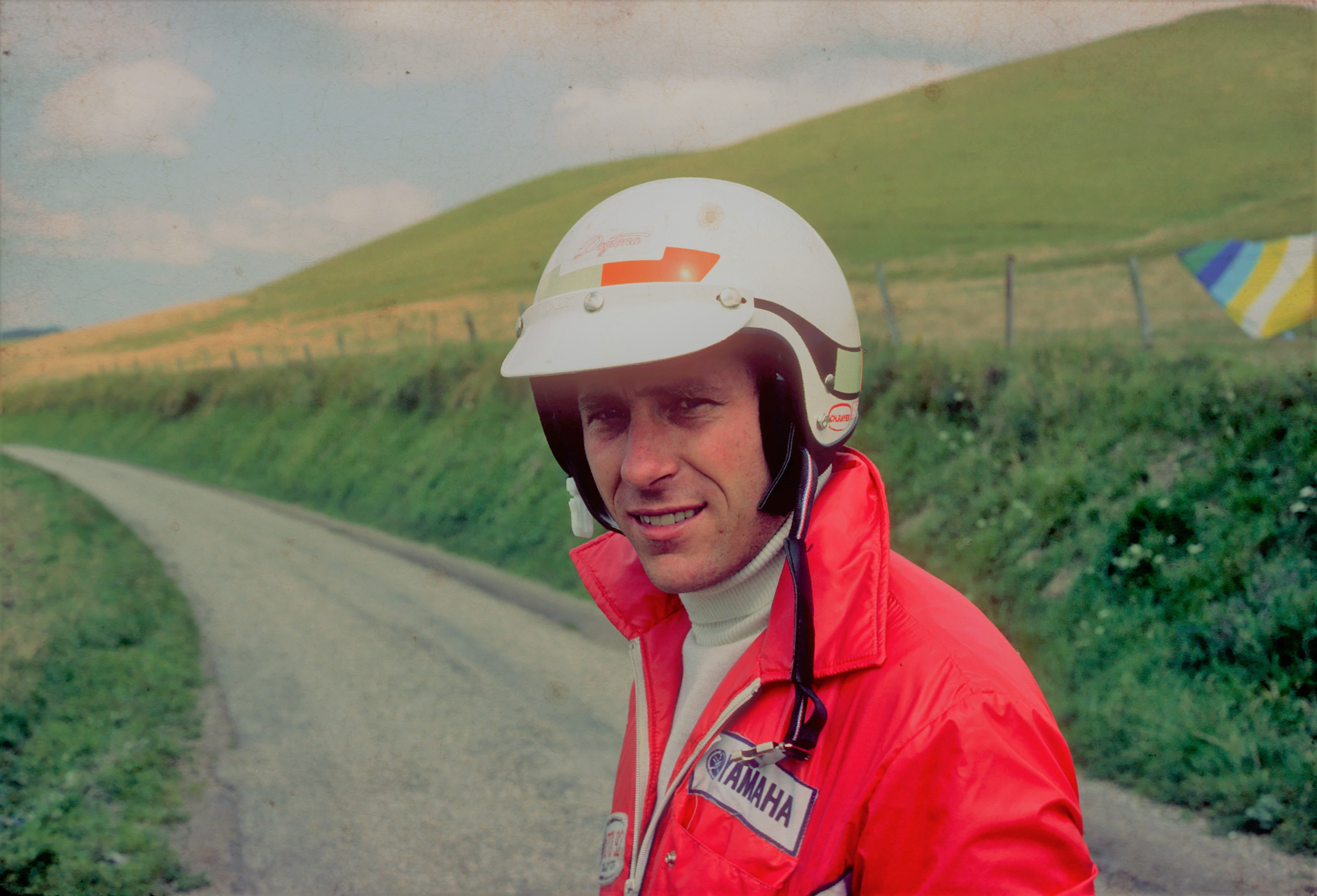
Chris RAYER Vol mont faucon.jpg

Christian Rayer (born 14 December 1945) is a French professional motorbike rider who also runs enterprises.

== Accomplishments ==
Six times champion of France in the Trial International, he participated in the creation of the first competition Trial bike, the Cota 247 when he was with the Spanish firm Montesa and won the trophy thrice at the famous “Six jours d’Ecosse” or “Scotland 6 days”. Thereafter, he was contracted by the Japanese firm Yamaha and participated in the creation of the first competition Trial bike for the brand in 1971, the TY 250cc.

Founder of the showroom Moto 92 at Chaville, Rayer went on to develop new engines for the bikes TY350-XT600-TY239-MX175-200cc. He was also the founder of the first riding school for all terrain bikers at Paris and participated as one of the official team members of Yamaha for the inaugural Paris-Dakar. He won many individual stages of this rally but was not successful in winning the rally itself. He took part in the Enduro races held at Touquet, again with Team Yamaha and finished second among 1000 starters.

An avid practitioner of Free-Flight and later, paragliding, Rayer was also interested and practises Microlight flying in France since 1977. Hunter and deep sea diver across the world, he would go on to become a professional Skipper of big sailing cruises for many years. He has written his autobiography and has explained his life in a book named “Le Parfum de l’au delà” or “The Scent of the beyond” which is available at Libra-moto, Paris.
