= Jutta Kleinschmidt =

German off-road racer

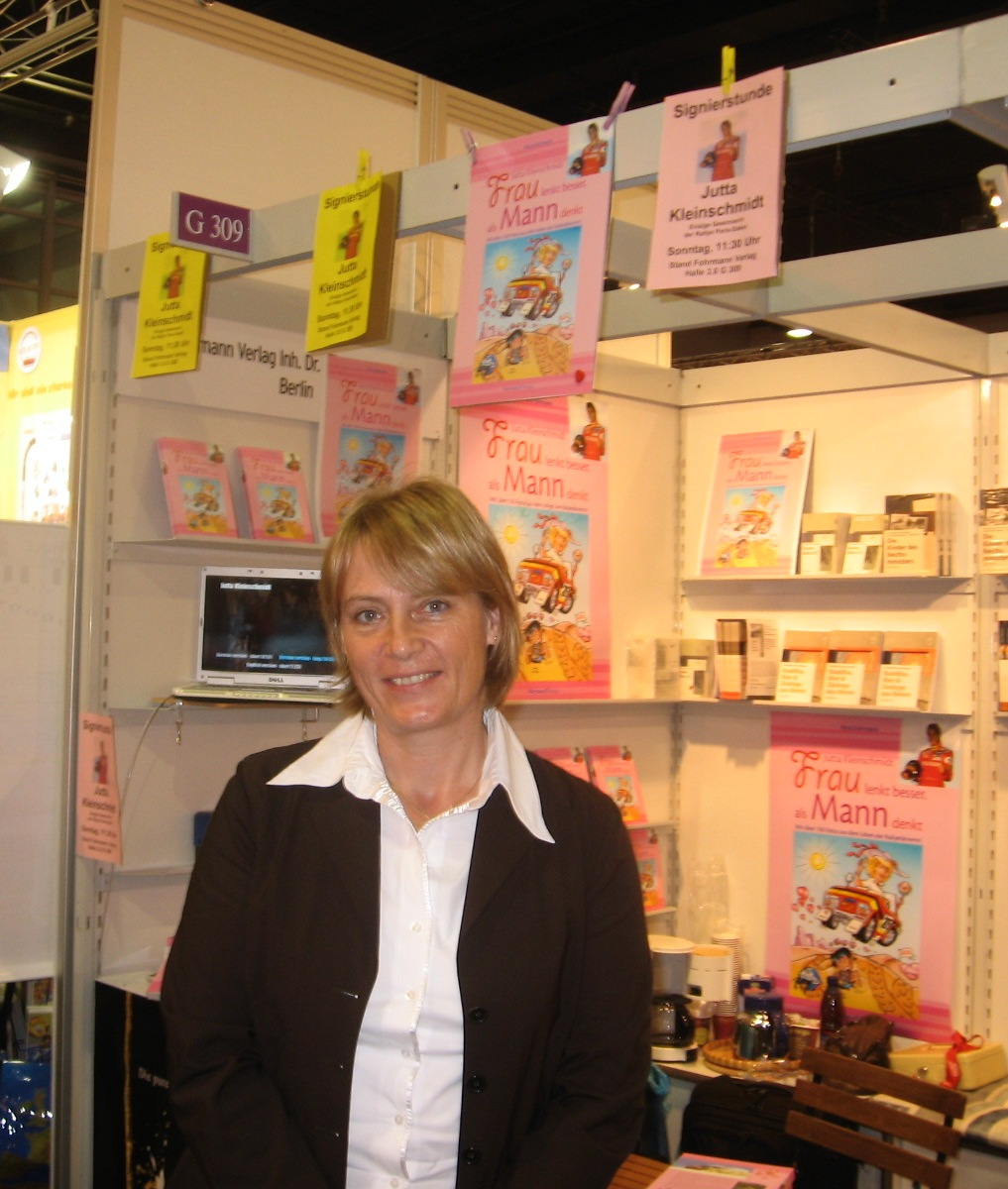
- Jutta Kleinschmidt in 2010
- Born: 29 August 1962 (age 64) Cologne, West Germany
- Championships: Dakar Rally
- Wins: 1 (2001)

Jutta Kleinschmidt (born 29 August 1962) is a German competitor of offroad automotive racing events. She is known for her numerous showings in the Paris Dakar Rally, and notably for having won the event in 2001, becoming the first woman driver to win the race and the only German to win the car category. In 2013, Kleinschmidt was named an FIM Legend for her motorcycling achievements.

== Biography ==
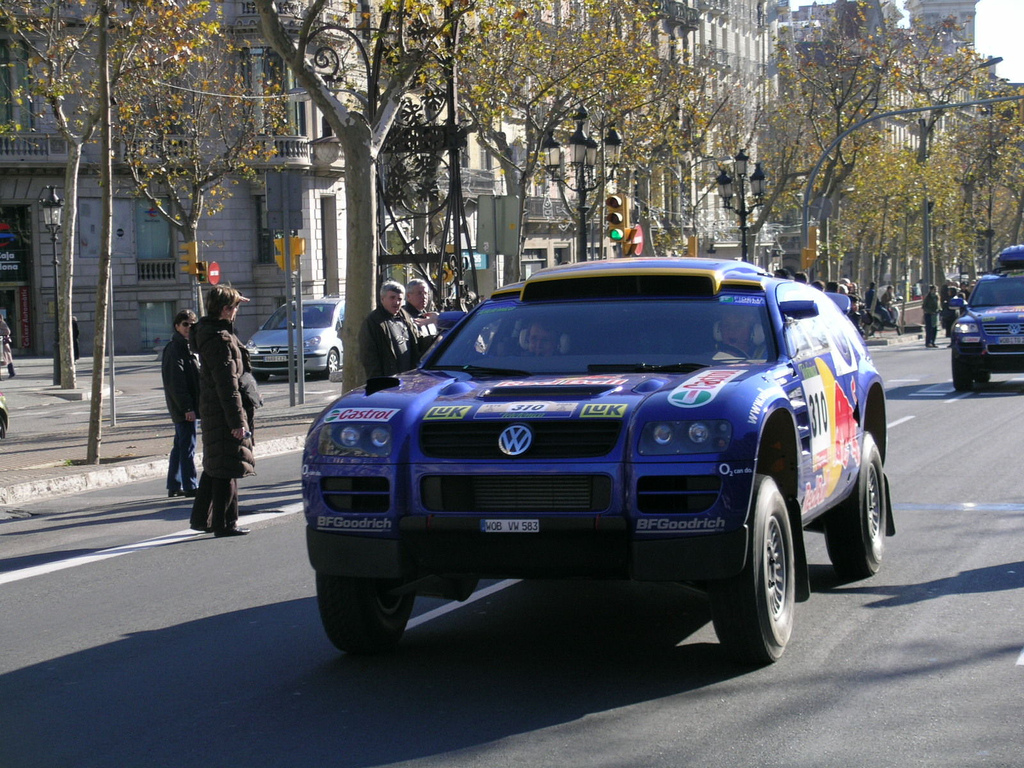
Jutta Kleinschmidt, VW Touareg, Paris Dakar Rally, 2005

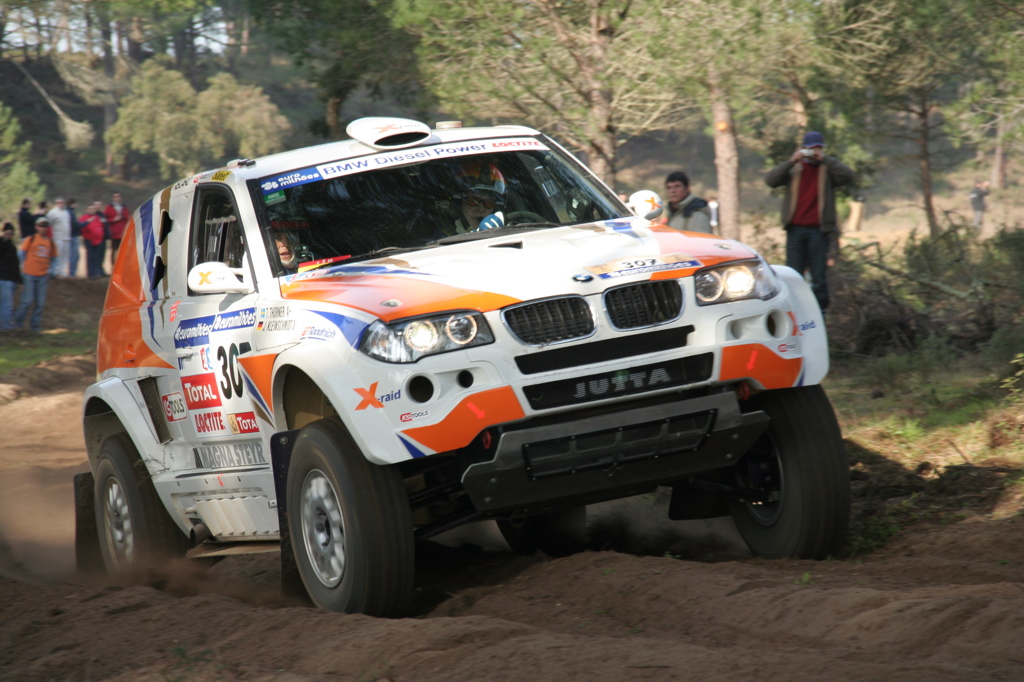
Jutta Kleinschmidt, BMW X3, Lisbon Dakar Rally 2007

Kleinschmidt was born in Cologne, Germany, and grew up in Berchtesgaden, Upper Bavaria. She studied physics at the Natural Science and Technical Academy Isny and then worked at BMW. She raced her first Paris-Dakar Rally in 1988 on a BMW motorcycle. In 1994, she switched to driving a car and, in 1997, became the first woman to win a stage of the Rally. The following year, she was on the podium and, in 2001, she became the first woman to win the Rally.

== Racing record ==
=== Dakar Rally ===
| Year | Category | Vehicle | Co-driver | Rank | Stages |
|---|---|---|---|---|---|
| 1988 | Bike | BMW | | Ret. | |
| 1992 | Bike | BMW | | 23rd | |
| 1994 | Bike | KTM | | 22nd | |
| 1995 | Cars | Mitsubishi Pajero Evolution | Dagmar Lohmann | 12th | |
| 1996 | Cars | Buggy Schlesser | Xavi Foj | Ret. | |
| 1997 | Cars | Buggy Schlesser | Jean Boutaire | 5th | 2 |
| 1998 | Cars | Buggy Schlesser | Matthew Stevenson | 24th | 1 |
| 1999 | Cars | Mitsubishi Pajero Evolution | Tina Thörner | 3rd | 2 |
| 2000 | Cars | Mitsubishi Pajero Evolution | Tina Thörner | 5th | 1 |
| 2001 | Cars | Mitsubishi Pajero Evolution | Andreas Schulz | 1st | |
| 2002 | Cars | Mitsubishi Pajero Evolution | Andreas Schulz | 2nd | 2 |
| 2003 | Cars | Mitsubishi Pajero Evolution | Fabrizia Pons | 8th | |
| 2004 | Cars | Volkswagen Race Touareg 2 | Fabrizia Pons | 17th | 1 |
| 2005 | Cars | Volkswagen Race Touareg 2 | Fabrizia Pons | 3rd | 1 |
| 2006 | Cars | Volkswagen Race Touareg 2 | Fabrizia Pons | Ret. | |
| 2007 | Cars | BMW X3 CC | Tina Thörner | 15th | |

=== Complete Extreme E results ===
(key)

| Year | Team | Car | 1 | 2 | 3 | 4 | 5 | 6 | 7 | 8 | 9 | 10 | Pos. | Points |
|---|---|---|---|---|---|---|---|---|---|---|---|---|---|---|
| 2021 | Abt Cupra XE | Spark ODYSSEY 21 | DES; Q | DES; R | OCE; Q 3 | OCE; R 5 | ARC; Q 2 | ARC; R 7 | ISL; Q 3 | ISL; R 2 | JUR; Q 4 | JUR; R 7 | 6th | 87 |
| 2022 | Abt Cupra XE | Spark ODYSSEY 21 | DES; 8 | ISL1; 9 | ISL2; DSQ | COP; WD | ENE | | | | | | 19th | 6 |

Sporting positions
| Preceded by Jean-Louis Schlesser | Dakar Rally; Car Winner; 2001 | Succeeded by Hiroshi Masuoka |
