= Mitsubishi Pajero Evolution =

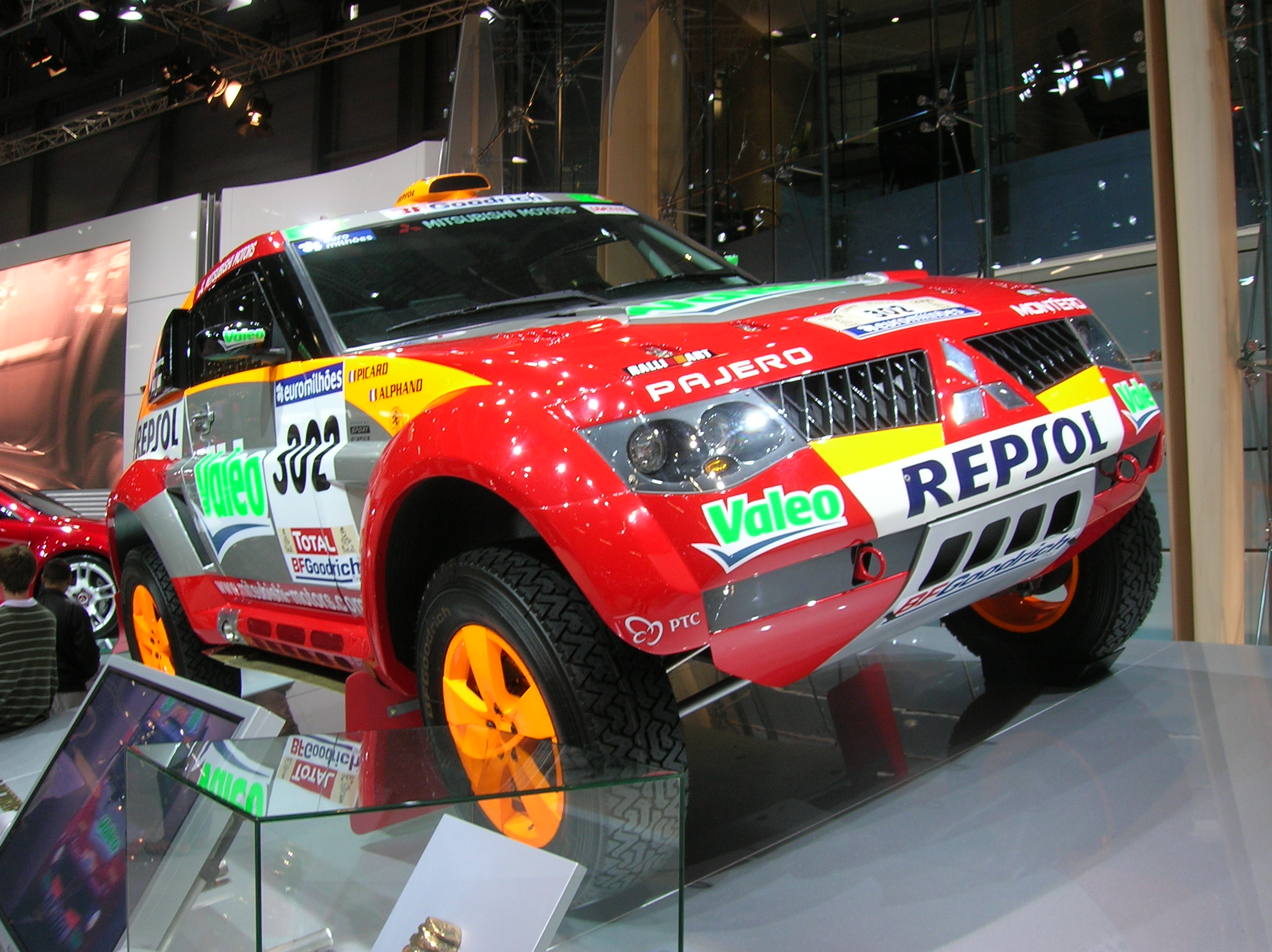
- The Pajero that won Dakar in 2006 with the former alpine skier Luc Alphand

Overview
- Manufacturer: Mitsubishi Motors
- Production: 1984–2007

Body and chassis
- Class: Rally raid
- Layout: front-engine, 4-wheel-drive

Powertrain
- Engine: 3.5 L 24-valve V6
- Transmission: 5 speed manual

Dimensions
- Wheelbase: 2,420 mm (95.3 in)
- Length: 4,075 mm (160.4 in)
- Width: 1,875 mm (73.8 in)
- Height: 1,915 mm (75.4 in)
- Curb weight: 1,970 kg (4,343 lb)

The Mitsubishi Pajero Evolution is an off-road competition car based on the Mitsubishi Pajero. It was specially designed to take part in the rally raids with the main objective of winning the Dakar Rally. In addition to those produced for competition use only, a road-legal version was manufactured by Mitsubishi from 1997 to 1999 in order to homologate the Pajero Evolution for the Dakar Rally's T2 class. Approximately 2500 road-legal examples were produced.

== Street version (V55W) ==
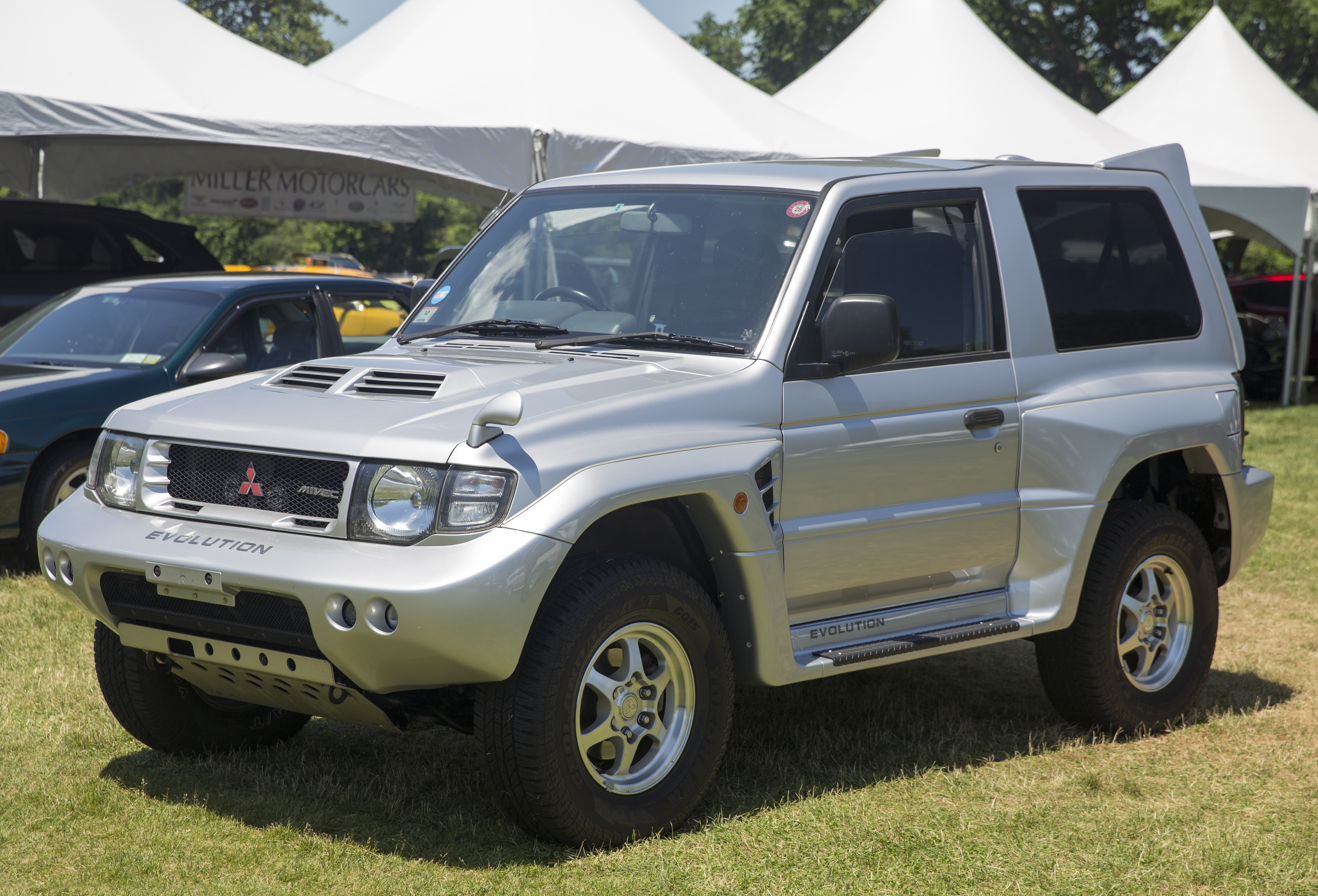
1997–1999 Mitsubishi Pajero Evolution street version

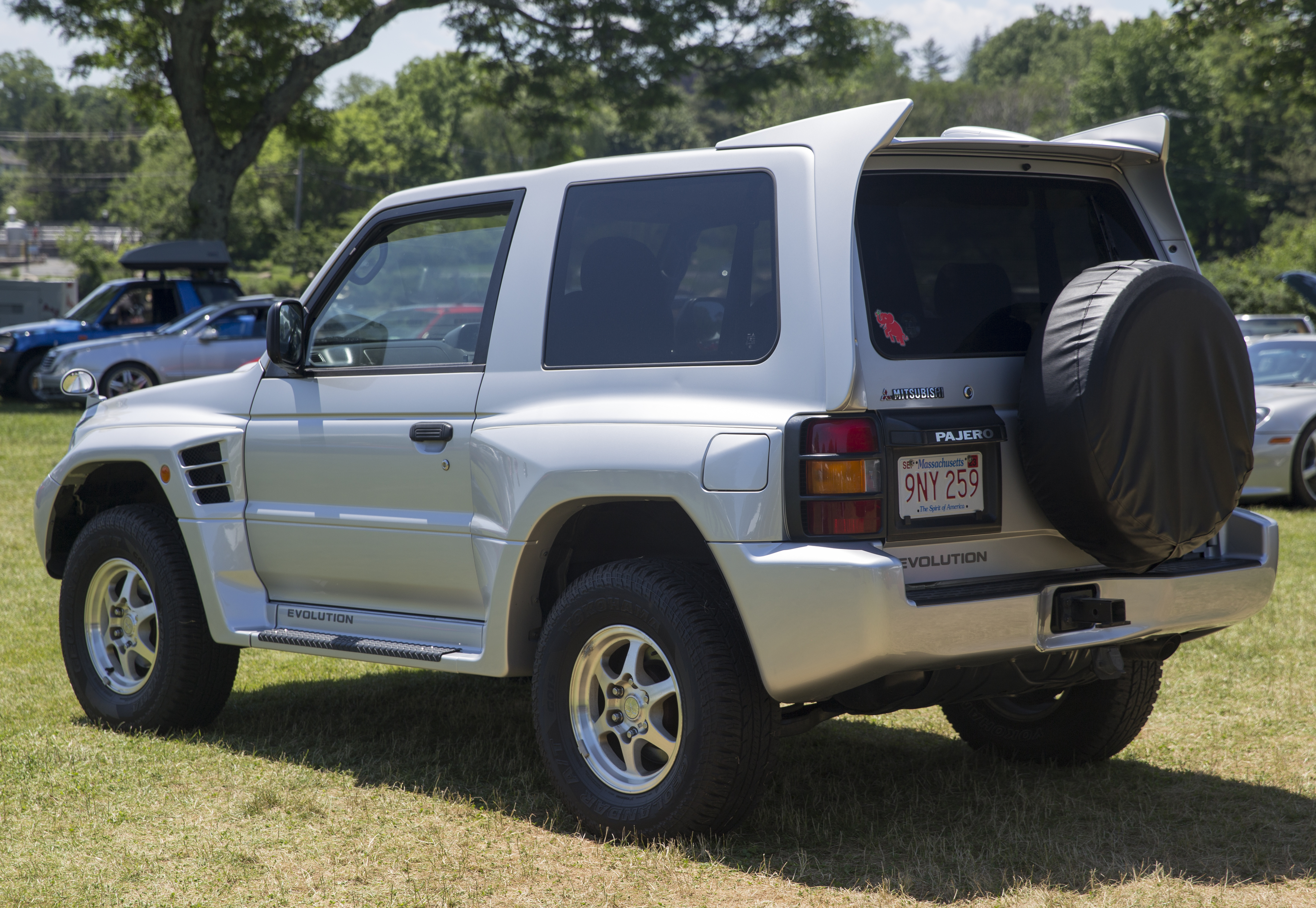
Rear view

The road-legal version of the Pajero Evolution was produced between 1997 and 1999. It was based on the second generation Pajero but had many features unique to the model. Approximately 2693 units were produced in order to homologate the type for the Dakar Rally's production-based T2 class. It was equipped with a 3.5-litre 24-valve DOHC V6 6G74 engine with MIVEC and a dual plenum variable intake. This engine produced a claimed 275 bhp at 6500 rpm. The two-door body incorporated large fender flares, two fin-like rear spoilers, a hood scoop, and various other racing-inspired styling elements. Skid plates and mudflaps were included for additional off-road protection. Double wishbone independent suspension was used on the front and the rear used a multi-link independent suspension unique to the Pajero Evolution. 4WD was standard, with front and rear Torsen differentials.

== Competition history ==
In January 1983, the first Pajero Evolution debuted at the Paris Dakar Rally, taking first place in 1985 at only the third attempt. Other wins followed, at events such as the Australasian Safari and Northern Forest.

With 12 victories from 1985 to 2007, it is the car that has won the Dakar Rally the most times.

=== Dakar victories ===
#	Year	Driver	Co-driver
1	1985	(France) Patrick Zaniroli	(France) Francia Jean Da Silva
2	1992	(France) Hubert Auriol	(France) Philippe Monnet
3	1993	(France) Bruno Saby	(France) Dominique Serieys
4	1997	(Japan) Kenjiro Shinozuka	(France) Henri Magne
5	1998	(France) Jean-Pierre Fontenay	(France) Gilles Picard
6	2001	(Germany) Jutta Kleinschmidt	(Germany) Andreas Schulz
7	2002	(Japan) Hiroshi Masuoka	(France) Pascal Maimon
8	2003	(Japan) Hiroshi Masuoka	(Germany) Andreas Schulz
9	2004	(France) Stéphane Peterhansel	(France) Jean-Paul Cottret
10	2005	(France) Stéphane Peterhansel	(France) Jean-Paul Cottret
11	2006	(France) Luc Alphand	(France) Gilles Picard
12	2007	(France) Stéphane Peterhansel	(France) Jean-Paul Cottret

A Mitsubishi Pajero Evolution, driven by Andrew Cowan, finished the 1984 Paris–Alger–Dakar as the third ranked winner in overall class after covering more than 11,000 km. Mitsubishi dominated with multiple first, second and third place podium finishes until their final wins in 2007. From 2001 to 2005, with the introduction of their third generation Pajero with monocoque chassis and fully independent suspension, Mitsubishi had 5 consecutive first-place finishes and 12 of all 15 podium finishes in the same time period. Their overall record was 12 total overall wins (1st place) in the "Cars Class" and 150 stage wins (the second best being Peugeot with only 78 stage wins in comparison). Mitsubishi earned the title of ‘Most Dakar Rally Wins by A Manufacturer’ from the Guinness World Records.
