= Gavardo (disambiguation) =

Gavardo may refer to:

- Gavardo, a town and comune in the province of Brescia, Lombardy, Italy
- Arimanno da Gavardo, Roman Catholic cardinal and Bishop of Brescia
- Biesse Carrera Gavardo, Italian UCI Continental team founded in 2018
- Carlo Alberto de Gavardo Prohens (1969–2015), a Chilean motorist and motorcyclist
