= Andreas Schulz (co-driver) =

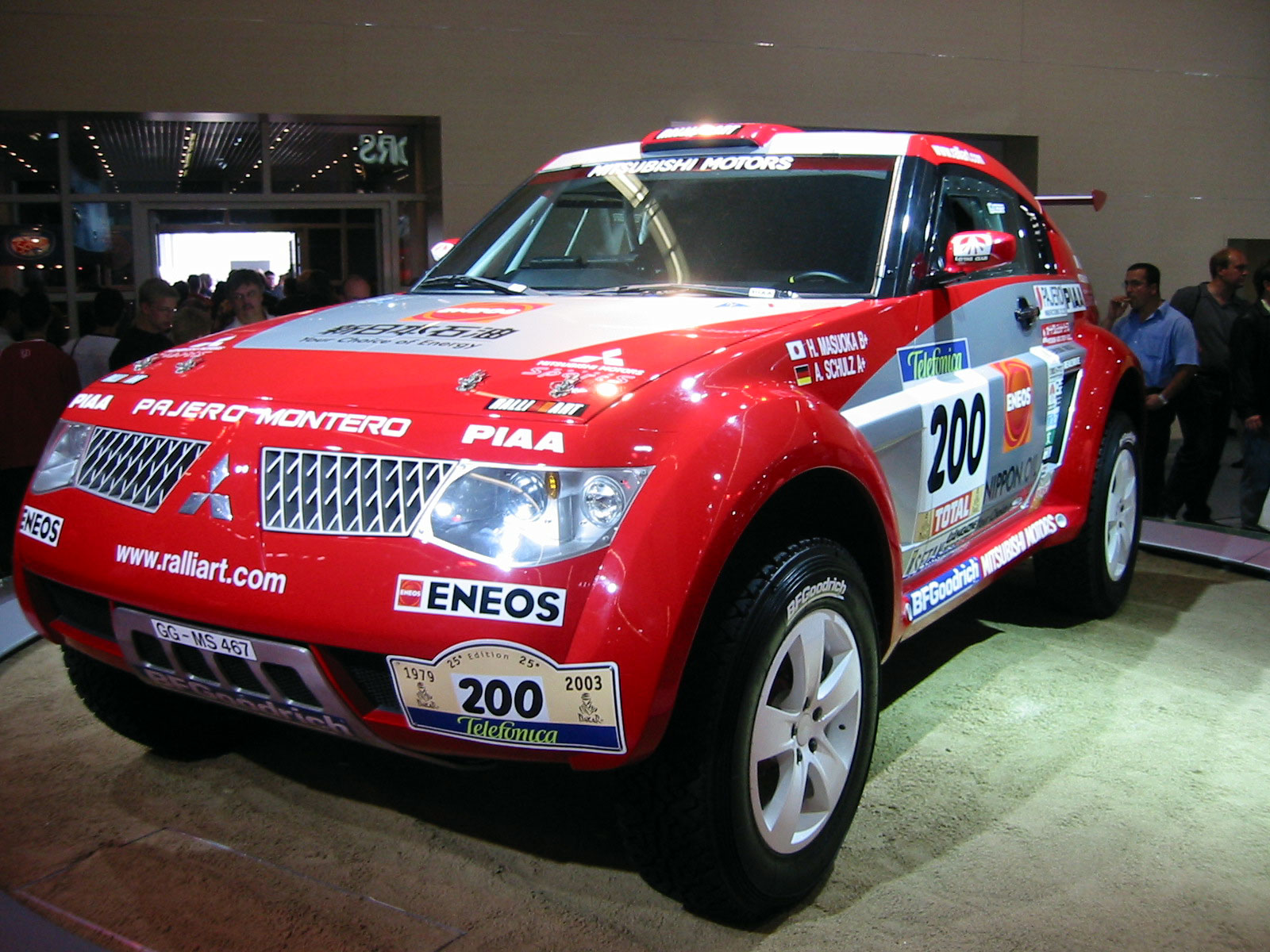
- Mitsubishi Pajero Evolution #200 which won Dakar Rally 2003 with Hiroshi Masuoka
- Born: 3 March 1955 (age 71) Munich, Germany
- Championships: 2001 Dakar Rally (cars); 2003 Dakar Rally (cars)

Andreas Schulz (born 3 March 1955) is a German co-driver who won, as navigator, two editions of Rally Dakar (cars). He is a member of the X-raid team.

== Rally Dakar ==
Year	Car	Driver	Rank
2000	Mitsubishi Pajero Evolution	(Japan) Hiroshi Masuoka	6th
2001	Mitsubishi Pajero Evolution	(Germany) Jutta Kleinschmidt	1st
2002	Mitsubishi Pajero Evolution	(Germany) Jutta Kleinschmidt	2nd
2003	Mitsubishi Pajero Evolution	(Japan) Hiroshi Masuoka	1st
2004	Mitsubishi Pajero Evolution	(Germany) Andrea Mayer	5th
2007	Volkswagen Race Touareg 2	(Portugal) Carlos Sousa	7th
