= Hiroshi Masuoka =

Hiroshi Masuoka may refer to:

- Hiroshi Masuoka (rally driver) (増岡 浩, born 1960), Japanese rally driver
- Hiroshi Masuoka (voice actor) (増岡 弘, 1936–2020), Japanese voice actor
