= Mitsubishi Evolution =

Mitsubishi Evolution may refer to:

- Mitsubishi Lancer Evolution
- Mitsubishi Pajero Evolution
