= Isny im Allgäu =

- Town
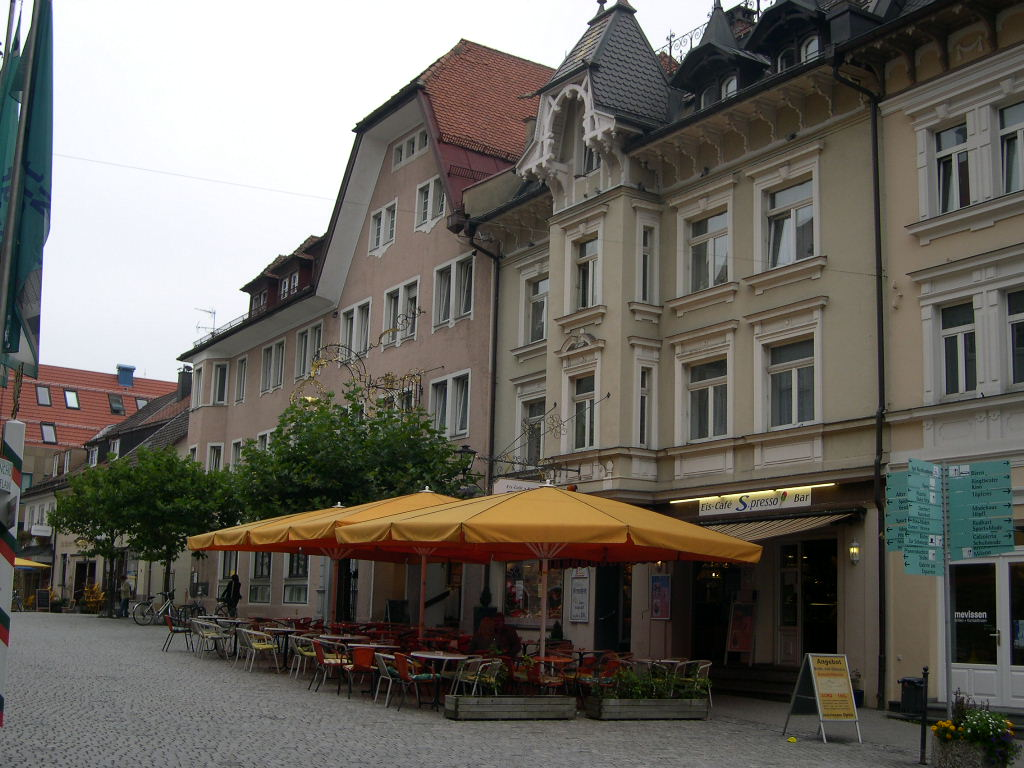

- Coat of arms

- Location of Isny im Allgäu within Ravensburg district
- Interactive map of Isny im Allgäu
- Location within Germany Location within Baden-Württemberg
- Coordinates: 47°41′31″N 10°2′22″E
- Country: Germany
- State: Baden-Württemberg
- Admin. region: Tübingen
- District: Ravensburg

Government
  - Mayor (2023–31): Rainer Magenreuter (Ind.)

Area
  - Total: 85.39 km^{2} (32.97 sq mi)
- Elevation: 704 m (2,310 ft)

Population (2025-12-31)
  - Total: 15,015
  - Density: 175.8/km^{2} (455.4/sq mi)
- Time zone: UTC+01:00 (CET)
  - Summer (DST): UTC+02:00 (CEST)
- Postal codes: 88316
- Dialling codes: 07562
- Vehicle registration: RV
- Website: www.isny.de

Isny im Allgäu (German pronunciation: [ˈɪsni ʔɪm ˈʔalɡɔʏ], lit. 'Isny in the Allgäu'; Low Alemannic: Isny im Allgai) is a town in south-eastern Baden-Württemberg, Germany. It is part of the district of Ravensburg, in the western, Württembergish part of the Allgäu region.

Isny was a Free Imperial City (Freie Reichsstadt) until the mediatisation of 1803.

== History ==
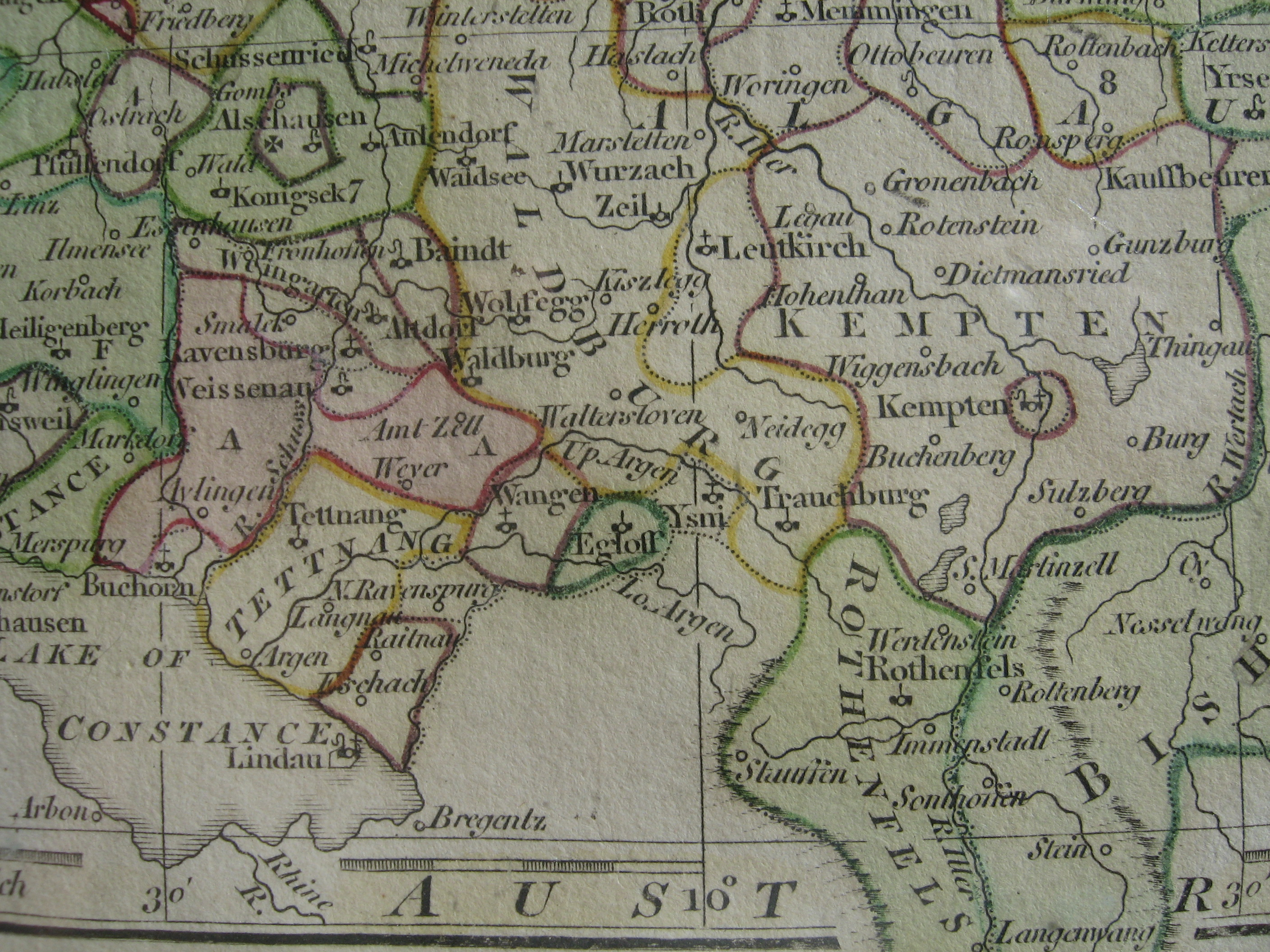
The tiny Imperial City of Isny was tucked between the counties of Waldburg and Egloff.

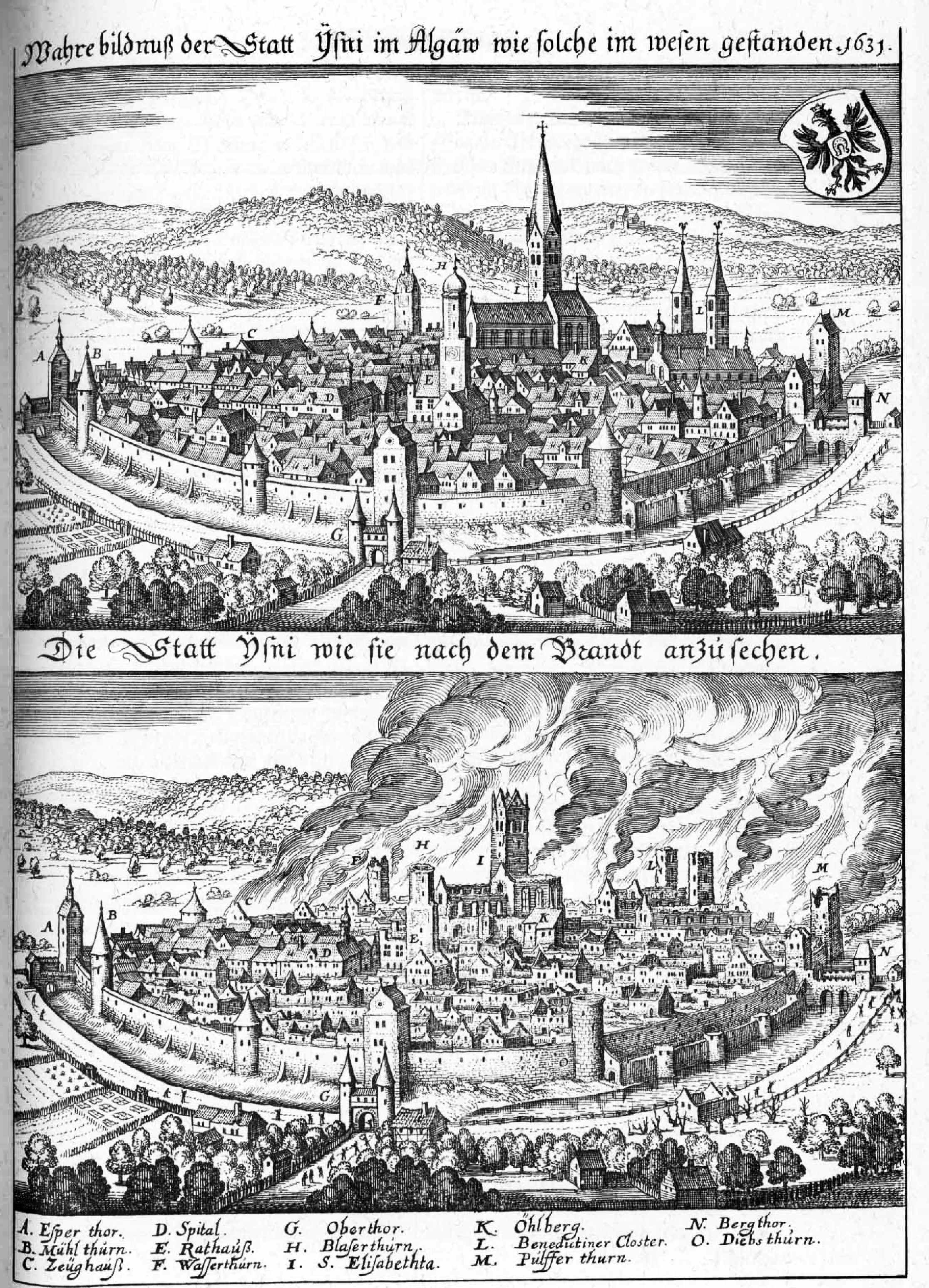
Isny before and after the great fire of 1631; St. George's Abbey church is the building with two spires to the right, with the rest of the monastery adjacent. Merian, Topographica Sueviae, 1643–1656

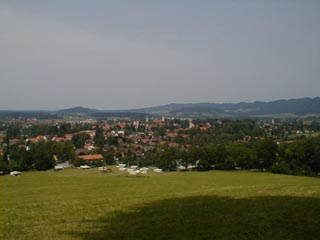
Isny im Allgau

During the three centuries following its origin in 1042, it was a commercial center controlled and exploited by various competing feudal lords. In the 13th century, Isny's merchants built a fortification system to protect the town from marauders and rival feudal rulers. The town is still partially surrounded by the city walls and moat that were built during these early turbulent times.

After three centuries of domination by feudal lords and territorial rulers, Isny's middle class was able to purchase the town's independence in 1365. Isny's status as an Imperial city made it a self-governing republic in which the city government was elected by propertied residents and in which the guild system thrived. In 1529, Isny's Protestant minority took the city council and voted to make the town Protestant and the Nikolaikirche became the town's main Protestant church. In 1803, the city was mediatized and became a possession of the Counts of Quadt. In 1806, the city passed to the Kingdom of Württemberg, which allowed the Catholic majority to once again move to the city. In 1889, the majority of urban residents was Catholic (1139 ev / 1444 Cath.).

Isny enjoyed a vibrant economy, based primarily on linen production, until competition from abroad, the devastation of the Thirty Years' War, and a series of fires and plagues brought production to a halt in the 17th century. The town experienced a revival after the end of World War II, when a rehabilitation center for war veterans was established there. Isny emerged from the war largely undamaged, and has since become a popular destination for vacationers and resort-goers.

In the late 1970s, the town commissioned the renowned graphic designer Otl Aicher to create a graphic identity for its tourist board. Aicher responded with a set of 128 black and white pictograms which, while initially controversial, are now regarded as forward thinking and are still used to promote the town.

== Twin towns – sister cities ==
Isny im Allgäu is twinned with:

- Andrychów, Poland
- Flawil, Switzerland
- Notre-Dame-de-Gravenchon, France
- Sotkamo, Finland
- Street, England, United Kingdom

== Notable people ==
- Johannes Nider (c. 1380 – 1438), a German theologian.
- Franz Ehrle (1845–1934), Jesuit and Cardinal of the Roman Catholic Church
- Hubert Netzer (1865–1939), sculptor and academy professor
- Eugen Graf von Quadt zu Wykradt und Isny (1887–1940), nobleman, military officer and politician
- Peter Rohwein (born 1962), ski jumper and ski coach
- Björn Freiberg (born 1970), actor, painter, author and former University teacher.
- Eva Stotz (born 1979), documentary film maker and director
- Robin Lässer (born 1991), motorcycle racer

== See also ==
- Natural Science and Technical Academy Isny
