= 2001 Paris–Dakar Rally =

Off-road motorsport event in Europe and Africa

2001 Dakar Rally
← Previous event	Next event →
- Host country: France; Spain; Morocco / (Sahrawi Arab Democratic Republic) Western Sahara; Mauritania; Mali; Senegal

Results
- Cars winner: (Germany) Jutta Kleinschmidt (Germany) Andreas Schulz; Mitsubishi
- Bikes winner: (Italy) Fabrizio Meoni; KTM
- Trucks winner: (Czech Republic) Karel Loprais (Czech Republic) Josef Kalina (Czech Republic) Petr Hamerla; Tatra

The 2001 Dakar Rally, also known as the 2001 Paris–Dakar Rally, was the 23rd running of the Dakar Rally event. The format was revised to reduce the amount of airborne assistance to competitors in favour of assistance vehicles. The 2001 rally was 6,600 miles (10,600 km) long and began in Paris, France, on New Year's Day, passing through Spain, Morocco, Western Sahara, Mauritania, Mali, before finishing at Dakar in Senegal. This was the last Paris-Dakar Rally that commenced and finished in the same locations as the original race. Jean-Louis Schlesser won the penultimate stage of the rally to take the lead but was penalised one hour for unsportsmanlike conduct. The rally was won by German Jutta Kleinschmidt, who became the first woman to win the event. The motorcycle class of the rally was won by Italian Fabrizio Meoni, with Karel Loprais winning the truck class.

On stage 19, teammates Schlesser and Servia started the stage earlier than scheduled, which meant that race leader Masuoka was left behind the trail of the two buggies. As Masuoka drove off track to overtake Servia, the car was damaged. Masuoka's co-driver, Pascal Maimon, walked to the track to try to stop Servia to complain, Servia braked and nearly ran over him. Schlesser and Servia were given a 60-minute penalty, which gave Kleinschmidt and Masuoka a comfortable lead for the final mini stage.

== Stages ==
Stage	Date	From	To	Total (km)	Stage winners		
Stage	Date	From	To	Total (km)	Bikes	Cars	Trucks
1	1 January	(France) Paris	(France) Narbonne	916	(Italy) G. Sala (Spain) N. Roma	(Spain) J. M. Servia	(Russia) F. Kabirov
2	2 January	(France) Narbonne	(Spain) Castellón de la Plana	560	(France) R. Sainct	(France) J-L. Schlesser	(Russia) V. Chagin
3	3 January	(Spain) Castellón de la Plana	(Spain) Almería	445	Stage cancelled^{1}	(France) J-P. Fontenay	(Brazil) A. de Azevedo
4	4 January	(Morocco) Nador	(Morocco) Er-Rachidia	602	(France) R. Sainct	(France) J-L. Schlesser	(Russia) V. Chagin
5	5 January	(Morocco) Er-Rachidia	(Morocco) Ouarzazate	572	(Chile) C. de Gavardo	(Spain) J. M. Servia	(Russia) V. Chagin
6	6 January	(Morocco) Ouarzazate	(Morocco) Guelmim	608	(Spain) N. Roma	(France) J-L. Schlesser	(Russia) V. Chagin
7	7 January	(Morocco) Guelmim	(Morocco) / (Sahrawi Arab Democratic Republic) Smara	489	(Spain) I. Esteve	(Japan) H. Masuoka	(Czech Republic) K. Loprais
8	8 January	(Morocco) / (Sahrawi Arab Democratic Republic) Smara	(Mauritania) El Ghallaouiya	628	(Spain) N. Roma	(Spain) J. M. Servia	(Russia) F. Kabirov
9	9 January	(Mauritania) El Ghallaouiya		518	(Spain) I. Esteve	(Germany) J. Kleinschmidt	(Czech Republic) K. Loprais
10	10 January	(Mauritania) El Ghallaouiya	(Mauritania) Atar	440	(South Africa) A. Cox	(Japan) H. Masuoka	(Czech Republic) K. Loprais
	11 January	(Mauritania) Atar		Rest day			
11	12 January	(Mauritania) Atar	(Mauritania) Nouakchott	508	(Sweden) P-G. Lundmark	(Spain) J. M. Servia	(Austria) P. Reif
12	13 January	(Mauritania) Nouakchott	(Mauritania) Tidjikdja	654	(Spain) J. Arcarons	(France) J-L. Schlesser	(Russia) V. Chagin
13	14 January	(Mauritania) Tidjikdja		535	(Finland) K. Tiainen	(Japan) H. Masuoka	(Czech Republic) K. Loprais
14	15 January	(Mauritania) Tidjikdja	(Mauritania) Tichit	234	(Finland) K. Tiainen	(France) J-L. Schlesser	(Czech Republic) K. Loprais
15	16 January	(Mauritania) Tichit	(Mauritania) Néma	499	(Finland) K. Tiainen	(Japan) H. Masuoka	(Czech Republic) K. Loprais
16	17 January	(Mauritania) Néma	(Mali) Bamako	776	(South Africa) A. Cox	(Portugal) C. Sousa	(Italy) C. Pattono
17	18 January	(Mali) Bamako	(Senegal) Bakel	804	(Italy) G. Sala	(France) J-L. Schlesser	(Czech Republic) K. Loprais
18	19 January	(Senegal) Bakel	(Senegal) Tambacounda	292	(France) C. Despres	(Japan) H. Masuoka	(Austria) P. Reif
19	20 January	(Senegal) Tambacounda	(Senegal) Dakar	564	(Italy) G. Sala	(Portugal) C. Sousa^{2}	(Austria) P. Reif
20	21 January	(Senegal) Dakar		95	(Finland) K. Tiainen (Italy) G. Sala	(Spain) J. M. Servia (France) J-L. Schlesser	(Czech Republic) K. Loprais

- ^1 - Stage cancelled for bikes only due to a sanctioning fee dispute between the race organisers and the Spanish Motorcycle Federation.
- ^2 - Jean-Louis Schlesser set the fastest time for the stage, but was penalised 1 hour and 6 minutes for starting the stage early, along with teammate Jose Maria Servia.
- Motorcycles principal entry
- KTM
- 1 Richard Sainct
- 3 Fabrizio Meoni
- 5 Giovanni Sala
- 7 Kari Tiainen
- 8 Jordi Arcarons
- 9 Alfie Cox
- 10 Jean Brucy
- 12 Carlo de Gavardo
- 20 Isidre Esteve Pujol
- BMW
- 2 Nani Roma
- 4 Jimmy Lewis
- 6 John Deacon
- 21 Andrea Mayer
- Honda
- 14 Johnny Campbell
- 19 Paulo Manuel Marques
- Cars principal entry
- Mitsubishi
- 201 Jean Pierre Fontenay
- 203 Kenjiro Shinozuka
- 205 Jutta Kleinschmidt
- 207 Miguel Prieto
- 208 Carlos Souza
- Schelesser-Renault
- 200 Jean Louis Schlesser
- 202 Jose Maria Servia
- 211 Luc Alphand
- Nissan
- 204 Thierry Delavergne
- 209 Gregoire de Mevius
- 210 Manuel Plaza Perez
- Ford
- 206 Philippe Wambergue
- Mercedes
- 213 Pierre Lartigue
- Trucks principal entry
- Kamaz
- 424 Vladimir Chagin
- 426 Firdaus Kabirov
- 428 Rafael Tibau
- Tatra
- 425 Karel Loprais
- 427 Andre de Azevedo
- Hino
- 400 Yoshimasa Sugawara
- 403 Gilbert Versino

== Stage Results ==
=== Motorcycles ===
	Stage result					General classification				
Stage	Pos	Competitor	Make	Time	Gap	Pos	Competitor	Make	Time	Gap
1	1	(Italy) Giovanni Sala	KTM	3:37		1	(Italy) Giovanni Sala	KTM	3:37	
1	1	(Spain) Nani Roma	BMW	3:37		1	(Spain) Nani Roma	BMW	3:37	
1	3	(South Africa) Alfie Cox	KTM	3:38	0:01	3	(South Africa) Alfie Cox	KTM	3:38	0:01
2	1	(France) Richard Sainct	KTM	31:25		1	(France) Richard Sainct	KTM	35:04	
2	2	(Spain) Nani Roma	BMW	32:21	0:56	2	(Spain) Nani Roma	BMW	35:58	0:54
2	3	(Finland) Kari Tiainen	KTM	32:22	0:57	3	(Italy) Giovanni Sala	KTM	36:00	0:56
3	Stage cancelled due to a dispute over sanctioning fees									
4	1	(France) Richard Sainct	KTM	1:16:01		1	(France) Richard Sainct	KTM	1:51:05	
4	2	(Chile) Carlo de Gavardo	KTM	1:17:15	1:14	2	(Italy) Fabrizio Meoni	KTM	1:54:24	3:19
4	3	(Italy) Fabrizio Meoni	KTM	1:17:28	1:27	3	(Spain) Nani Roma	BMW	1:54:32	3:27
5	1	(Chile) Carlo de Gavardo	KTM	3:14:17		1	(France) Richard Sainct	KTM	5:05:43	
5	2	(France) Richard Sainct	KTM	3:14:38	0:21	2	(Chile) Carlo de Gavardo	KTM	5:11:06	5:23
5	3	(Finland) Kari Tiainen	KTM	3:16:35	2:18	3	(Finland) Kari Tiainen	KTM	5:11:09	5:26
6	1	(Spain) Nani Roma	BMW	3:13:39		1	(France) Richard Sainct	KTM	8:19:44	
6	2	(Finland) Kari Tiainen	KTM	3:14:01	0:22	2	(Finland) Kari Tiainen	KTM	8:25:10	5:26
6	2	(France) Richard Sainct	KTM	3:14:01	0:22	3	(Spain) Nani Roma	BMW	8:25:21	5:37
7	1	(Spain) Isidre Esteve	KTM	4:02:29		1	(France) Richard Sainct	KTM	12:27:01	
7	2	(Italy) Fabrizio Meoni	KTM	4:03:09	0:40	2	(Italy) Fabrizio Meoni	KTM	12:32:09	5:08
7	3	(Sweden) Per-Gunnar Lundmark	KTM	4:03:25	0:56	3	(Spain) Nani Roma	BMW	12:34:32	7:31
8	1	(Spain) Nani Roma	BMW	5:16:41		1	(France) Richard Sainct	KTM	17:46:02	
8	2	(France) Richard Sainct	KTM	5:19:01	2:20	2	(Spain) Nani Roma	BMW	17:51:13	5:11
8	3	(South Africa) Alfie Cox	KTM	5:21:02	4:21	3	(Italy) Fabrizio Meoni	KTM	17:53:55	7:53
9	1	(Spain) Isidre Esteve	KTM	5:22:33		1	(France) Richard Sainct	KTM	23:17:26	
9	2	(Italy) Giovanni Sala	KTM	5:23:53	1:20	2	(Italy) Fabrizio Meoni	KTM	23:22:19	4:53
9	3	(Chile) Carlo de Gavardo	KTM	5:25:26	2:53	3	(Spain) Nani Roma	BMW	23:22:19	4:53
10	1	(South Africa) Alfie Cox	KTM	5:02:04		1	(Italy) Fabrizio Meoni	KTM	28:26:17	
10	2	(Spain) Jordi Arcarons	KTM	5:03:03	0:59	2	(Spain) Jordi Arcarons	KTM	28:46:30	20:13
10	3	(Italy) Fabrizio Meoni	KTM	5:03:58	1:54	3	(Chile) Carlo de Gavardo	KTM	29:06:43	40:26
11	1	(Sweden) Per-Gunnar Lundmark	KTM	4:23:46		1	(Italy) Fabrizio Meoni	KTM	32:57:36	
11	2	(Chile) Carlo de Gavardo	KTM	4:28:04	4:18	2	(Spain) Jordi Arcarons	KTM	33:18:49	21:13
11	3	(South Africa) Alfie Cox	KTM	4:29:59	6:13	3	(Chile) Carlo de Gavardo	KTM	33:34:47	37:11
12	1	(Spain) Jordi Arcarons	KTM	7:11:16		1	(Italy) Fabrizio Meoni	KTM	40:09:49	
12	2	(Italy) Fabrizio Meoni	KTM	7:12:13	0:57	2	(Spain) Jordi Arcarons	KTM	40:30:05	20:16
12	3	(Chile) Carlo de Gavardo	KTM	7:13:10	1:54	3	(Chile) Carlo de Gavardo	KTM	33:34:47	38:08
13	1	(Finland) Kari Tiainen	KTM	6:53:31		1	(Italy) Fabrizio Meoni	KTM	47:32:00	
13	2	(Spain) Isidre Esteve	KTM	7:18:54	25:23	2	(Spain) Jordi Arcarons	KTM	48:09:43	37:43
13	3	(South Africa) Alfie Cox	KTM	7:19:23	25:52	3	(Chile) Carlo de Gavardo	KTM	48:09:43	37:43
14	1	(Finland) Kari Tiainen	KTM	2:53:07		1	(Italy) Fabrizio Meoni	KTM	50:44:12	
14	2	(United Kingdom) John Deacon	BMW	3:07:39	14:32	2	(Spain) Jordi Arcarons	KTM	51:04:41	20:29
14	3	(Italy) Giovanni Sala	KTM	3:09:39	16:32	3	(Chile) Carlo de Gavardo	KTM	51:23:06	38:54
15	1	(Finland) Kari Tiainen	KTM	6:07:31		1	(Italy) Fabrizio Meoni	KTM	57:36:11	
15	2	(Spain) Isidre Esteve	KTM	6:50:05	42:34	2	(Spain) Jordi Arcarons	KTM	57:58:54	22:43
15	3	(South Africa) Alfie Cox	KTM	6:50:21	42:50	3	(Chile) Carlo de Gavardo	KTM	58:15:03	38:52
16	1	(South Africa) Alfie Cox	KTM	2:30:28		1	(Italy) Fabrizio Meoni	KTM	60:18:04	
16	2	(Italy) Giovanni Sala	KTM	2:32:51	2:23	2	(Spain) Jordi Arcarons	KTM	60:39:19	21:15
16	3	(Sweden) Per-Gunnar Lundmark	KTM	2:37:29	7:01	3	(Chile) Carlo de Gavardo	KTM	60:58:41	40:37
17	1	(Italy) Giovanni Sala	KTM	3:38:32		1	(Italy) Fabrizio Meoni	KTM	64:06:04	
17	2	(France) Cyril Despres	BMW	3:44:51	6:19	2	(Spain) Jordi Arcarons	KTM	64:29:40	23:36
17	3	(Finland) Kari Tiainen	KTM	3:46:04	7:32	3	(Chile) Carlo de Gavardo	KTM	64:48:16	42:12
18	1	(France) Cyril Despres	BMW	2:52:16		1	(Italy) Fabrizio Meoni	KTM	67:07:38	
18	2	(Italy) Giovanni Sala	KTM	2:53:07	0:51	2	(Spain) Jordi Arcarons	KTM	67:29:42	22:04
18	3	(South Africa) Alfie Cox	KTM	2:56:26	4:10	3	(Chile) Carlo de Gavardo	KTM	67:49:47	42:09
19	1	(Italy) Giovanni Sala	KTM	2:28:00		1	(Italy) Fabrizio Meoni	KTM	69:43:49	
19	2	(France) Cyril Despres	BMW	2:30:20	2:20	2	(Spain) Jordi Arcarons	KTM	70:08:52	25:03
19	3	(United States) Jimmy Lewis	BMW	2:32:10	4:10	3	(Chile) Carlo de Gavardo	KTM	70:27:47	43:58
20	1	(Finland) Kari Tiainen	KTM	15:48		1	(Italy) Fabrizio Meoni	KTM	70:01:08	
20	1	(Italy) Giovanni Sala	KTM	15:48		2	(Spain) Jordi Arcarons	KTM	70:26:18	25:10
20	3	(France) Éric Aubijoux	KTM	15:51	0:03	3	(Chile) Carlo de Gavardo	KTM	70:45:19	44:11

=== Cars ===
	Stage result					General classification				
Stage	Pos	Competitor	Make	Time	Gap	Pos	Competitor	Make	Time	Gap
1	1	(Spain) Jose Maria Servia (Belgium) Jean-Marie Lurquin	Schlesser-Renault	3:43		1	(Spain) Jose Maria Servia (Belgium) Jean-Marie Lurquin	Schlesser-Renault	3:43	
1	2	(France) Jean-Louis Schlesser (Andorra) Henri Magne	Schlesser-Renault	3:45	0:02	2	(France) Jean-Louis Schlesser (Andorra) Henri Magne	Schlesser-Renault	3:45	0:02
1	3	(Japan) Kenjiro Shinozuka (United Kingdom) Fred Gallagher	Mitsubishi	3:48	0:05	3	(Japan) Kenjiro Shinozuka (United Kingdom) Fred Gallagher	Mitsubishi	3:48	0:05
1	3	(Japan) Hiroshi Masuoka (France) Pascal Maimon	Mitsubishi	3:48	0:05	3	(Japan) Hiroshi Masuoka (France) Pascal Maimon	Mitsubishi	3:48	0:05
2	1	(France) Jean-Louis Schlesser (Andorra) Henri Magne	Schlesser-Renault	30:33		1	(France) Jean-Louis Schlesser (Andorra) Henri Magne	Schlesser-Renault	34:18	
2	2	(Japan) Hiroshi Masuoka (France) Pascal Maimon	Mitsubishi	30:44	0:11	2	(Japan) Hiroshi Masuoka (France) Pascal Maimon	Mitsubishi	34:32	0:14
2	3	(Japan) Kenjiro Shinozuka (United Kingdom) Fred Gallagher	Mitsubishi	31:12	0:39	3	(Japan) Kenjiro Shinozuka (United Kingdom) Fred Gallagher	Mitsubishi	35:00	0:42
3	1	(France) Jean-Pierre Fontenay (France) Gilles Picard	Mitsubishi	8:20		1	(Japan) Hiroshi Masuoka (France) Pascal Maimon	Mitsubishi	42:58	
3	2	(Japan) Hiroshi Masuoka (France) Pascal Maimon	Mitsubishi	8:26	0:06	2	(France) Jean-Louis Schlesser (Andorra) Henri Magne	Schlesser-Renault	43:44	0:46
3	3	(Belgium) Gregoire De Mevius (France) Alain Guehennec	Nissan	8:42	0:22	3	(France) Jean-Pierre Fontenay (France) Gilles Picard	Mitsubishi	43:58	1:00
4	1	(France) Jean-Louis Schlesser (Andorra) Henri Magne	Schlesser-Renault	1:12:12		1	(France) Jean-Louis Schlesser (Andorra) Henri Magne	Schlesser-Renault	1:55:56	
4	2	(France) Jean-Pierre Fontenay (France) Gilles Picard	Mitsubishi	1:15:52	3:40	2	(France) Jean-Pierre Fontenay (France) Gilles Picard	Mitsubishi	1:59:50	3:54
4	3	(Spain) Jose Maria Servia (Belgium) Jean-Marie Lurquin	Schlesser-Renault	1:19:06	6:54	3	(Spain) Jose Maria Servia (Belgium) Jean-Marie Lurquin	Schlesser-Renault	2:03:10	7:14
5	1	(Spain) Jose Maria Servia (Belgium) Jean-Marie Lurquin	Schlesser-Renault	3:25:55		1	(France) Jean-Louis Schlesser (Andorra) Henri Magne	Schlesser-Renault	5:23:50	
5	2	(France) Jean-Louis Schlesser (Andorra) Henri Magne	Schlesser-Renault	3:27:54	1:59	2	(France) Jean-Pierre Fontenay (France) Gilles Picard	Mitsubishi	5:28:04	4:14
5	3	(France) Jean-Pierre Fontenay (France) Gilles Picard	Mitsubishi	3:28:14	2:19	3	(Spain) Jose Maria Servia (Belgium) Jean-Marie Lurquin	Schlesser-Renault	5:29:05	5:15
6	1	(France) Jean-Louis Schlesser (Andorra) Henri Magne	Schlesser-Renault	3:17:24		1	(France) Jean-Louis Schlesser (Andorra) Henri Magne	Schlesser-Renault	8:41:14	
6	2	(Spain) Jose Maria Servia (Belgium) Jean-Marie Lurquin	Schlesser-Renault	3:18:06	0:42	2	(Spain) Jose Maria Servia (Belgium) Jean-Marie Lurquin	Schlesser-Renault	8:47:11	5:57
6	3	(France) Jean-Pierre Fontenay (France) Gilles Picard	Mitsubishi	3:25:49	8:25	3	(France) Jean-Pierre Fontenay (France) Gilles Picard	Mitsubishi	8:53:53	12:39
7	1	(Japan) Hiroshi Masuoka (France) Pascal Maimon	Mitsubishi	4:01:31		1	(Spain) Jose Maria Servia (Belgium) Jean-Marie Lurquin	Schlesser-Renault	12:52:18	
7	2	(Spain) Jose Maria Servia (Belgium) Jean-Marie Lurquin	Schlesser-Renault	4:05:07	3:36	2	(France) Jean-Pierre Fontenay (France) Gilles Picard	Mitsubishi	13:00:55	8:37
7	3	(France) Jean-Pierre Fontenay (France) Gilles Picard	Mitsubishi	4:07:02	5:31	3	(Japan) Hiroshi Masuoka (France) Pascal Maimon	Mitsubishi	13:06:19	14:01
8	1	(Spain) Jose Maria Servia (Belgium) Jean-Marie Lurquin	Schlesser-Renault	5:14:27		1	(Spain) Jose Maria Servia (Belgium) Jean-Marie Lurquin	Schlesser-Renault	18:06:45	
8	2	(Japan) Hiroshi Masuoka (France) Pascal Maimon	Mitsubishi	5:16:25	1:58	2	(France) Jean-Pierre Fontenay (France) Gilles Picard	Mitsubishi	18:18:15	11:30
8	3	(France) Jean-Pierre Fontenay (France) Gilles Picard	Mitsubishi	5:17:20	2:53	3	(Japan) Hiroshi Masuoka (France) Pascal Maimon	Mitsubishi	18:22:44	15:59
9	1	(Germany) Jutta Kleinschmidt (Germany) Andreas Schulz	Mitsubishi	5:22:42		1	(Spain) Jose Maria Servia (Belgium) Jean-Marie Lurquin	Schlesser-Renault	23:35:58	
9	2	(France) Jean-Louis Schlesser (Andorra) Henri Magne	Schlesser-Renault	5:23:07	0:25	2	(Japan) Hiroshi Masuoka (France) Pascal Maimon	Mitsubishi	23:45:52	9:54
9	3	(Japan) Hiroshi Masuoka (France) Pascal Maimon	Mitsubishi	5:23:08	0:26	3	(France) Jean-Pierre Fontenay (France) Gilles Picard	Mitsubishi	23:54:56	18:59
10	1	(Japan) Hiroshi Masuoka (France) Pascal Maimon	Mitsubishi	5:10:24		1	(Japan) Hiroshi Masuoka (France) Pascal Maimon	Mitsubishi	29:26:16	
10	2	(France) Jean-Louis Schlesser (Andorra) Henri Magne	Schlesser-Renault	5:20:02	9:38	2	(France) Jean-Louis Schlesser (Andorra) Henri Magne	Schlesser-Renault	30:01:16	35:00
10	3	(Germany) Jutta Kleinschmidt (Germany) Andreas Schulz	Mitsubishi	5:25:35	15:11	3	(Portugal) Carlos Sousa (France) Jean-Michel Polato	Mitsubishi	30:04:45	38:29
11	1	(Spain) Jose Maria Servia (Belgium) Jean-Marie Lurquin	Schlesser-Renault	4:04:33		1	(Japan) Hiroshi Masuoka (France) Pascal Maimon	Mitsubishi	34:23:24	
11	2	(Germany) Jutta Kleinschmidt (Germany) Andreas Schulz	Mitsubishi	4:23:55	19:22	2	(Germany) Jutta Kleinschmidt (Germany) Andreas Schulz	Mitsubishi	34:35:33	12:09
11	3	(Belgium) Stephane Henrard (Spain) Jose Manuel Martinez	Volkswagen	4:29:10	24:37	3	(Portugal) Carlos Sousa (France) Jean-Michel Polato	Mitsubishi	34:36:37	13:13
12	1	(France) Jean-Louis Schlesser (Andorra) Henri Magne	Schlesser-Renault	7:01:47		1	(Japan) Hiroshi Masuoka (France) Pascal Maimon	Mitsubishi	41:46:55	
12	2	(Portugal) Carlos Sousa (France) Jean-Michel Polato	Mitsubishi	7:13:46	11:59	2	(Portugal) Carlos Sousa (France) Jean-Michel Polato	Mitsubishi	41:50:23	3:28
12	3	(France) Jean-Pierre Fontenay (France) Gilles Picard	Mitsubishi	7:15:53	14:06	3	(Germany) Jutta Kleinschmidt (Germany) Andreas Schulz	Mitsubishi	41:55:44	8:49
13	1	(Japan) Hiroshi Masuoka (France) Pascal Maimon	Mitsubishi	6:42:16		1	(Japan) Hiroshi Masuoka (France) Pascal Maimon	Mitsubishi	48:29:11	
13	2	(France) Jean-Louis Schlesser (Andorra) Henri Magne	Schlesser-Renault	7:02:05	19:49	2	(France) Jean-Louis Schlesser (Andorra) Henri Magne	Schlesser-Renault	49:06:36	37:25
13	3	(Portugal) Carlos Sousa (France) Jean-Michel Polato	Mitsubishi	7:21:09	38:53	3	(Portugal) Carlos Sousa (France) Jean-Michel Polato	Mitsubishi	49:11:32	42:21
14	1	(France) Jean-Louis Schlesser (Andorra) Henri Magne	Schlesser-Renault	3:02:11		1	(Japan) Hiroshi Masuoka (France) Pascal Maimon	Mitsubishi	51:34:48	
14	2	(Portugal) Carlos Sousa (France) Jean-Michel Polato	Mitsubishi	3:02:35	0:24	2	(France) Jean-Louis Schlesser (Andorra) Henri Magne	Schlesser-Renault	52:08:47	33:59
14	3	(France) Jean-Pierre Fontenay (France) Gilles Picard	Mitsubishi	3:03:23	1:12	3	(Portugal) Carlos Sousa (France) Jean-Michel Polato	Mitsubishi	52:14:07	39:19
15	1	(Japan) Hiroshi Masuoka (France) Pascal Maimon	Mitsubishi	6:14:34		1	(Japan) Hiroshi Masuoka (France) Pascal Maimon	Mitsubishi	57:49:22	
15	2	(France) Jean-Louis Schlesser (Andorra) Henri Magne	Schlesser-Renault	6:18:55	4:21	2	(France) Jean-Louis Schlesser (Andorra) Henri Magne	Schlesser-Renault	58:27:42	38:20
15	3	(Spain) Jose Maria Servia (Belgium) Jean-Marie Lurquin	Schlesser-Renault	6:23:01	8:27	3	(Portugal) Carlos Sousa (France) Jean-Michel Polato	Mitsubishi	58:53:58	1:04:36
16	1	(Portugal) Carlos Sousa (France) Jean-Michel Polato	Mitsubishi	2:26:13		1	(Japan) Hiroshi Masuoka (France) Pascal Maimon	Mitsubishi	60:53:12	
16	2	(Germany) Jutta Kleinschmidt (Germany) Andreas Schulz	Mitsubishi	2:29:38	3:25	2	(France) Jean-Louis Schlesser (Andorra) Henri Magne	Schlesser-Renault	60:59:40	6:28
16	3	(Spain) Jose Maria Servia (Belgium) Jean-Marie Lurquin	Schlesser-Renault	2:30:59	4:46	3	(Portugal) Carlos Sousa (France) Jean-Michel Polato	Mitsubishi	61:20:11	26:59
17	1	(France) Jean-Louis Schlesser (Andorra) Henri Magne	Schlesser-Renault	3:34:10		1	(Japan) Hiroshi Masuoka (France) Pascal Maimon	Mitsubishi	64:27:59	
17	2	(Japan) Hiroshi Masuoka (France) Pascal Maimon	Mitsubishi	3:34:47	0:37	2	(France) Jean-Louis Schlesser (Andorra) Henri Magne	Schlesser-Renault	64:33:50	5:51
17	3	(Germany) Jutta Kleinschmidt (Germany) Andreas Schulz	Mitsubishi	3:36:22	2:12	3	(Germany) Jutta Kleinschmidt (Germany) Andreas Schulz	Mitsubishi	65:00:24	32:25
18	1	(Japan) Hiroshi Masuoka (France) Pascal Maimon	Mitsubishi	2:44:47		1	(Japan) Hiroshi Masuoka (France) Pascal Maimon	Mitsubishi	67:12:46	
18	2	(France) Jean-Louis Schlesser (Andorra) Henri Magne	Schlesser-Renault	2:46:24	1:37	2	(France) Jean-Louis Schlesser (Andorra) Henri Magne	Schlesser-Renault	67:20:14	7:28
18	3	(Spain) Jose Maria Servia (Belgium) Jean-Marie Lurquin	Schlesser-Renault	2:48:19	3:32	3	(Germany) Jutta Kleinschmidt (Germany) Andreas Schulz	Mitsubishi	67:52:29	39:43
19	1	(Portugal) Carlos Sousa (France) Jean-Michel Polato	Mitsubishi	2:27:20		1	(Germany) Jutta Kleinschmidt (Germany) Andreas Schulz	Mitsubishi	70:22:51	
19	2	(Germany) Jutta Kleinschmidt (Germany) Andreas Schulz	Mitsubishi	2:30:22	3:02	2	(Japan) Hiroshi Masuoka (France) Pascal Maimon	Mitsubishi	70:25:46	2:55
19	3	(Belgium) Gregoire De Mevius (France) Alain Guehennec	Nissan	2:31:02	3:42	3	(France) Jean-Louis Schlesser (Andorra) Henri Magne	Schlesser-Renault	70:46:53	24:02
20	1	(France) Jean-Louis Schlesser (Andorra) Henri Magne	Schlesser-Renault	18:42		1	(Germany) Jutta Kleinschmidt (Germany) Andreas Schulz	Mitsubishi	70:42:06	
20	1	(Spain) Jose Maria Servia (Belgium) Jean-Marie Lurquin	Schlesser-Renault	18:42		2	(Japan) Hiroshi Masuoka (France) Pascal Maimon	Mitsubishi	70:44:45	2:39
20	3	(Portugal) Carlos Sousa (France) Jean-Michel Polato	Mitsubishi	18:54	0:12	3	(France) Jean-Louis Schlesser (Andorra) Henri Magne	Schlesser-Renault	71:05:35	23:39

=== Trucks ===
	Stage result					General classification				
Stage	Pos	Competitor	Make	Time	Gap	Pos	Competitor	Make	Time	Gap
1	1	(Russia) Firdaus Kabirov (Russia) Ayrat Belyaev (Russia) Foat Bigachev	Kamaz	5:00		1	(Russia) Firdaus Kabirov (Russia) Ayrat Belyaev (Russia) Foat Bigachev	Kamaz	5:00	
1	2	(Brazil) André de Azevedo (Czech Republic) Tomáš Tomeček (Czech Republic) Jaromír Martinec	Tatra	5:02	0:02	2	(Brazil) André de Azevedo (Czech Republic) Tomáš Tomeček (Czech Republic) Jaromír Martinec	Tatra	5:02	0:02
1	3	(Italy) Guido Toni (Italy) Alessandro Pio	Mercedes-Benz	5:13	0:13	3	(Italy) Guido Toni (Italy) Alessandro Pio	Mercedes-Benz	5:13	0:13
2	1	(Russia) Vladimir Chagin (Russia) Ilgizar Mardeev (Russia) Jamil Kamalov	Kamaz	37:57		1	(Russia) Vladimir Chagin (Russia) Ilgizar Mardeev (Russia) Jamil Kamalov	Kamaz	43:11	
2	2	(Russia) Firdaus Kabirov (Russia) Ayrat Belyaev (Russia) Foat Bigachev	Kamaz	38:43	0:46	2	(Russia) Firdaus Kabirov (Russia) Ayrat Belyaev (Russia) Foat Bigachev	Kamaz	43:43	0:32
2	3	(Czech Republic) Karel Loprais (Czech Republic) Josef Kalina (Czech Republic) Petr Hamerla	Tatra	38:47	0:50	3	(Czech Republic) Karel Loprais (Czech Republic) Josef Kalina (Czech Republic) Petr Hamerla	Tatra	44:04	0:53
3	1	(Brazil) André de Azevedo (Czech Republic) Tomáš Tomeček (Czech Republic) Jaromír Martinec	Tatra	10:03		1	(Russia) Vladimir Chagin (Russia) Ilgizar Mardeev (Russia) Jamil Kamalov	Kamaz	53:47	0:25
3	2	(Russia) Firdaus Kabirov (Russia) Ayrat Belyaev (Russia) Foat Bigachev	Kamaz	10:04	0:01	2	(Russia) Firdaus Kabirov (Russia) Ayrat Belyaev (Russia) Foat Bigachev	Kamaz	53:47	0:25
3	3	(Czech Republic) Karel Loprais (Czech Republic) Josef Kalina (Czech Republic) Petr Hamerla	Tatra	10:10	0:07	3	(Czech Republic) Karel Loprais (Czech Republic) Josef Kalina (Czech Republic) Petr Hamerla	Tatra	54:14	0:52
4	1	(Russia) Vladimir Chagin (Russia) Ilgizar Mardeev (Russia) Jamil Kamalov	Kamaz	1:34:36		1	(Russia) Vladimir Chagin (Russia) Ilgizar Mardeev (Russia) Jamil Kamalov	Kamaz	2:27:58	
4	2	(Russia) Firdaus Kabirov (Russia) Ayrat Belyaev (Russia) Foat Bigachev	Kamaz	1:35:05	0:29	2	(Russia) Firdaus Kabirov (Russia) Ayrat Belyaev (Russia) Foat Bigachev	Kamaz	2:28:52	0:54
4	3	(Brazil) André de Azevedo (Czech Republic) Tomáš Tomeček (Czech Republic) Jaromír Martinec	Tatra	1:37:09	2:33	3	(Brazil) André de Azevedo (Czech Republic) Tomáš Tomeček (Czech Republic) Jaromír Martinec	Tatra	2:32:29	4:31
5	1	(Russia) Vladimir Chagin (Russia) Ilgizar Mardeev (Russia) Jamil Kamalov	Kamaz	4:05:51		1	(Russia) Vladimir Chagin (Russia) Ilgizar Mardeev (Russia) Jamil Kamalov	Kamaz	6:33:49	
5	2	(Russia) Firdaus Kabirov (Russia) Ayrat Belyaev (Russia) Foat Bigachev	Kamaz	4:06:01	0:10	2	(Russia) Firdaus Kabirov (Russia) Ayrat Belyaev (Russia) Foat Bigachev	Kamaz	6:34:53	1:04
5	3	(Brazil) André de Azevedo (Czech Republic) Tomáš Tomeček (Czech Republic) Jaromír Martinec	Tatra	4:14:35	8:44	3	(Brazil) André de Azevedo (Czech Republic) Tomáš Tomeček (Czech Republic) Jaromír Martinec	Tatra	6:47:04	13:15
6	1	(Russia) Vladimir Chagin (Russia) Ilgizar Mardeev (Russia) Jamil Kamalov	Kamaz	4:00:09		1	(Russia) Vladimir Chagin (Russia) Ilgizar Mardeev (Russia) Jamil Kamalov	Kamaz	10:33:58	
6	2	(Russia) Firdaus Kabirov (Russia) Ayrat Belyaev (Russia) Foat Bigachev	Kamaz	4:04:31	4:22	2	(Russia) Firdaus Kabirov (Russia) Ayrat Belyaev (Russia) Foat Bigachev	Kamaz	10:39:24	5:26
6	3	(Russia) Sergey Guiria (Russia) Sergey Savostin (Russia) Sergey Rechentnikov	Kamaz	4:12:25	12:16	3	(Brazil) André de Azevedo (Czech Republic) Tomáš Tomeček (Czech Republic) Jaromír Martinec	Tatra	11:00:23	26:25
7	1	(Czech Republic) Karel Loprais (Czech Republic) Josef Kalina (Czech Republic) Petr Hamerla	Tatra	4:56:36		1	(Russia) Firdaus Kabirov (Russia) Ayrat Belyaev (Russia) Foat Bigachev	Kamaz	15:36:43	
7	2	(Russia) Firdaus Kabirov (Russia) Ayrat Belyaev (Russia) Foat Bigachev	Kamaz	4:57:19	0:43	2	(Russia) Vladimir Chagin (Russia) Ilgizar Mardeev (Russia) Jamil Kamalov	Kamaz	15:41:00	4:17
7	3	(Russia) Vladimir Chagin (Russia) Ilgizar Mardeev (Russia) Jamil Kamalov	Kamaz	5:07:02	10:26	3	(Brazil) André de Azevedo (Czech Republic) Tomáš Tomeček (Czech Republic) Jaromír Martinec	Tatra	16:10:14	33:31
8	1	(Russia) Firdaus Kabirov (Russia) Ayrat Belyaev (Russia) Foat Bigachev	Kamaz	6:17:25		1	(Russia) Firdaus Kabirov (Russia) Ayrat Belyaev (Russia) Foat Bigachev	Kamaz	21:54:08	
8	2	(Russia) Vladimir Chagin (Russia) Ilgizar Mardeev (Russia) Jamil Kamalov	Kamaz	6:20:14	2:49	2	(Russia) Vladimir Chagin (Russia) Ilgizar Mardeev (Russia) Jamil Kamalov	Kamaz	22:01:14	7:06
8	3	(Czech Republic) Karel Loprais (Czech Republic) Josef Kalina (Czech Republic) Petr Hamerla	Tatra	6:32:08	14:43	3	(Brazil) André de Azevedo (Czech Republic) Tomáš Tomeček (Czech Republic) Jaromír Martinec	Tatra	22:45:45	51:37
9	1	(Czech Republic) Karel Loprais (Czech Republic) Josef Kalina (Czech Republic) Petr Hamerla	Tatra	6:58:00		1	(Brazil) André de Azevedo (Czech Republic) Tomáš Tomeček (Czech Republic) Jaromír Martinec	Tatra	29:49:39	
9	2	(Brazil) André de Azevedo (Czech Republic) Tomáš Tomeček (Czech Republic) Jaromír Martinec	Tatra	7:03:54	5:54	2	(Russia) Vladimir Chagin (Russia) Ilgizar Mardeev (Russia) Jamil Kamalov	Kamaz	29:51:18	1:39
9	3	(Russia) Vladimir Chagin (Russia) Ilgizar Mardeev (Russia) Jamil Kamalov	Kamaz	7:50:04	52:04	3	(Czech Republic) Karel Loprais (Czech Republic) Josef Kalina (Czech Republic) Petr Hamerla	Tatra	30:49:35	59:56
10	1	(Czech Republic) Karel Loprais (Czech Republic) Josef Kalina (Czech Republic) Petr Hamerla	Tatra	7:08:01		1	(Czech Republic) Karel Loprais (Czech Republic) Josef Kalina (Czech Republic) Petr Hamerla	Tatra	38:02:36	
10	2	(France) Gilbert Versino (France) Philippe Challoy (France) Claude Breton	Hino	7:56:11	48:10	2	(Russia) Vladimir Chagin (Russia) Ilgizar Mardeev (Russia) Jamil Kamalov	Kamaz	39:17:29	1:14:53
10	3	(Japan) Yoshimasa Sugawara (Japan) Seiichi Suzuki (Japan) Teruhito Sugawara	Hino	8:27:41	1:19:40	3	(Japan) Yoshimasa Sugawara (Japan) Seiichi Suzuki (Japan) Teruhito Sugawara	Hino	41:30:30	3:27:54
11	1	(Austria) Peter Reif (Austria) Gunther Pichlbauer (Germany) Holger Hermann Roth	MAN	6:05:10		1	(Czech Republic) Karel Loprais (Czech Republic) Josef Kalina (Czech Republic) Petr Hamerla	Tatra	44:14:42	
11	2	(Czech Republic) Karel Loprais (Czech Republic) Josef Kalina (Czech Republic) Petr Hamerla	Tatra	6:12:06	6:56	2	(Russia) Vladimir Chagin (Russia) Ilgizar Mardeev (Russia) Jamil Kamalov	Kamaz	47:42:37	3:27:55
11	3	(France) François Marcheix (France) Sylvain Genibrel (France) Daniël Moquet	Mercedes-Benz	6:55:14	50:04	3	(Japan) Yoshimasa Sugawara (Japan) Seiichi Suzuki (Japan) Teruhito Sugawara	Hino	48:31:35	4:16:53
12	1	(Russia) Vladimir Chagin (Russia) Ilgizar Mardeev (Russia) Jamil Kamalov	Kamaz	9:16:39		1	(Czech Republic) Karel Loprais (Czech Republic) Josef Kalina (Czech Republic) Petr Hamerla	Tatra	53:38:30	
12	2	(Czech Republic) Karel Loprais (Czech Republic) Josef Kalina (Czech Republic) Petr Hamerla	Tatra	9:23:48	7:09	2	(Russia) Vladimir Chagin (Russia) Ilgizar Mardeev (Russia) Jamil Kamalov	Kamaz	56:59:16	3:20:46
12	3	(France) Gilbert Versino (France) Philippe Challoy (France) Claude Breton	Hino	9:33:39	17:00	3	(Japan) Yoshimasa Sugawara (Japan) Seiichi Suzuki (Japan) Teruhito Sugawara	Hino	58:33:16	4:54:46
13	1	(Czech Republic) Karel Loprais (Czech Republic) Josef Kalina (Czech Republic) Petr Hamerla	Tatra	9:36:32		1	(Czech Republic) Karel Loprais (Czech Republic) Josef Kalina (Czech Republic) Petr Hamerla	Tatra	63:15:02	
13	2	(Japan) Yoshimasa Sugawara (Japan) Seiichi Suzuki (Japan) Teruhito Sugawara	Hino	10:34:27	57:55	2	(Japan) Yoshimasa Sugawara (Japan) Seiichi Suzuki (Japan) Teruhito Sugawara	Hino	69:07:43	5:52:41
13	3	(France) Gilbert Versino (France) Philippe Challoy (France) Claude Breton	Hino	11:00:34	1:24:02	3	(France) Gilbert Versino (France) Philippe Challoy (France) Claude Breton	Hino	71:53:40	8:38:38
14	1	(Czech Republic) Karel Loprais (Czech Republic) Josef Kalina (Czech Republic) Petr Hamerla	Tatra	4:19:44		1	(Czech Republic) Karel Loprais (Czech Republic) Josef Kalina (Czech Republic) Petr Hamerla	Tatra	67:34:46	
14	2	(Japan) Yoshimasa Sugawara (Japan) Seiichi Suzuki (Japan) Teruhito Sugawara	Hino	4:28:15	8:31	2	(Japan) Yoshimasa Sugawara (Japan) Seiichi Suzuki (Japan) Teruhito Sugawara	Hino	73:35:58	6:01:12
14	3	(France) Gilbert Versino (France) Philippe Challoy (France) Claude Breton	Hino	4:39:14	19:30	3	(France) Gilbert Versino (France) Philippe Challoy (France) Claude Breton	Hino	76:32:54	8:58:08
15	1	(Czech Republic) Karel Loprais (Czech Republic) Josef Kalina (Czech Republic) Petr Hamerla	Tatra	9:00:20		1	(Czech Republic) Karel Loprais (Czech Republic) Josef Kalina (Czech Republic) Petr Hamerla	Tatra	76:35:06	
15	2	(Austria) Peter Reif (Austria) Gunther Pichlbauer (Germany) Holger Hermann Roth	MAN	10:02:39	1:02:19	2	(Japan) Yoshimasa Sugawara (Japan) Seiichi Suzuki (Japan) Teruhito Sugawara	Hino	84:14:35	7:39:29
15	3	(Italy) Corrado Pattono (France) Michel Plateau	Mercedes-Benz	10:22:23	1:22:03	3	(Austria) Peter Reif (Austria) Gunther Pichlbauer (Germany) Holger Hermann Roth	MAN	92:17:13	15:42:07
16	1	(Italy) Corrado Pattono (France) Michel Plateau	Mercedes-Benz	3:34:23		1	(Czech Republic) Karel Loprais (Czech Republic) Josef Kalina (Czech Republic) Petr Hamerla	Tatra	80:09:46	
16	2	(Czech Republic) Karel Loprais (Czech Republic) Josef Kalina (Czech Republic) Petr Hamerla	Tatra	3:34:40	0:17	2	(Japan) Yoshimasa Sugawara (Japan) Seiichi Suzuki (Japan) Teruhito Sugawara	Hino	87:58:27	7:48:41
16	3	(Austria) Peter Reif (Austria) Gunther Pichlbauer (Germany) Holger Hermann Roth	MAN	3:43:37	9:14	3	(Austria) Peter Reif (Austria) Gunther Pichlbauer (Germany) Holger Hermann Roth	MAN	96:00:50	15:51:04
17	1	(Czech Republic) Karel Loprais (Czech Republic) Josef Kalina (Czech Republic) Petr Hamerla	Tatra	5:07:45		1	(Czech Republic) Karel Loprais (Czech Republic) Josef Kalina (Czech Republic) Petr Hamerla	Tatra	85:17:31	
17	2	(Italy) Corrado Pattono (France) Michel Plateau	Mercedes-Benz	5:26:02	18:17	2	(Japan) Yoshimasa Sugawara (Japan) Seiichi Suzuki (Japan) Teruhito Sugawara	Hino	93:24:57	8:07:26
17	3	(Japan) Yoshimasa Sugawara (Japan) Seiichi Suzuki (Japan) Teruhito Sugawara	Hino	5:26:30	18:45	3	(Austria) Peter Reif (Austria) Gunther Pichlbauer (Germany) Holger Hermann Roth	MAN	102:11:49	16:54:18
18	1	(Austria) Peter Reif (Austria) Gunther Pichlbauer (Germany) Holger Hermann Roth	MAN	4:13:26		1	(Czech Republic) Karel Loprais (Czech Republic) Josef Kalina (Czech Republic) Petr Hamerla	Tatra	89:43:02	
18	2	(Czech Republic) Karel Loprais (Czech Republic) Josef Kalina (Czech Republic) Petr Hamerla	Tatra	4:25:31	12:05	2	(Japan) Yoshimasa Sugawara (Japan) Seiichi Suzuki (Japan) Teruhito Sugawara	Hino	97:51:39	8:08:37
18	3	(Japan) Yoshimasa Sugawara (Japan) Seiichi Suzuki (Japan) Teruhito Sugawara	Hino	4:26:42	13:16	3	(Austria) Peter Reif (Austria) Gunther Pichlbauer (Germany) Holger Hermann Roth	MAN	106:25:15	16:42:13
19	1	(Austria) Peter Reif (Austria) Gunther Pichlbauer (Germany) Holger Hermann Roth	MAN	3:19:03		1	(Czech Republic) Karel Loprais (Czech Republic) Josef Kalina (Czech Republic) Petr Hamerla	Tatra	93:13:13	
19	2	(France) François Marcheix (France) Sylvain Genibrel (France) Daniël Moquet	Mercedes-Benz	3:20:54	1:51	2	(Japan) Yoshimasa Sugawara (Japan) Seiichi Suzuki (Japan) Teruhito Sugawara	Hino	101:21:14	8:08:01
19	3	(Japan) Yoshimasa Sugawara (Japan) Seiichi Suzuki (Japan) Teruhito Sugawara	Hino	3:29:35	10:32	3	(Austria) Peter Reif (Austria) Gunther Pichlbauer (Germany) Holger Hermann Roth	MAN	109:44:18	16:31:05
20	1	(Czech Republic) Karel Loprais (Czech Republic) Josef Kalina (Czech Republic) Petr Hamerla	Tatra	27:24		1	(Czech Republic) Karel Loprais (Czech Republic) Josef Kalina (Czech Republic) Petr Hamerla	Tatra	93:40:37	
20	2	(Japan) Yoshimasa Sugawara (Japan) Seiichi Suzuki (Japan) Teruhito Sugawara	Hino	28:38	1:14	2	(Japan) Yoshimasa Sugawara (Japan) Seiichi Suzuki (Japan) Teruhito Sugawara	Hino	101:49:52	8:09:15
20	3	(France) François Marcheix (France) Sylvain Genibrel (France) Daniël Moquet	Mercedes-Benz	29:06	1:42	3	(Austria) Peter Reif (Austria) Gunther Pichlbauer (Germany) Holger Hermann Roth	MAN	110:14:45	16:34:08

== Final standings ==
=== Motorcycles ===
Pos	No.	Rider	Bike	Entrant	Time
1	3	(Italy) Fabrizio Meoni	KTM	KTM Factory Team	70:01:08
2	8	(Spain) Jordi Arcarons	KTM	KTM Factory Team	+25:10
3	12	(Chile) Carlo de Gavardo	KTM	YPF-Entel-La Tercera	+44:11
4	20	(Spain) Isidre Esteve	KTM		+1:02:44
5	9	(South Africa) Alfie Cox	KTM	KTM Factory Team	+1:19:09
6	6	(United Kingdom) John Deacon	BMW	BMW Motorrad	+3:45:51
7	4	(United States) Jimmy Lewis	BMW	BMW Motorrad	+3:49:12
8	14	(United States) Johnny Campbell	Honda		+7:45:05
9	10	(France) Jean Brucy	KTM	KTM Factory Team	+7:56:15
10	18	(Portugal) Bernardo Vilar	KTM	Vitamina R Telecel	+10:12:12

=== Cars ===
Pos	No.	Driver	Co-Driver	Car	Entrant	Time
1	205	(Germany) Jutta Kleinschmidt	(Germany) Andreas Schulz	Mitsubishi	Mitsubishi Ralliart Germany	70:42:06
2	203	(Japan) Hiroshi Masuoka	(France) Pascal Maimon	Mitsubishi	Nisseki Mitsubishi Ralliart	+2:39
3	200	(France) Jean-Louis Schlesser	(Andorra) Henri Magne	Schlesser-Renault	Schlesser-Renault-Elf	+23:29
4	202	(Spain) Jose Maria Servia	(Belgium) Jean-Marie Lurquin	Schlesser-Renault	Schlesser-Renault-Elf	+2:06:24
5	208	(Portugal) Carlos Sousa	(France) Jean-Michel Polato	Mitsubishi	Mitsubishi Ralliart Portugal	+2:08:30
6	201	(France) Jean-Pierre Fontenay	(France) Gilles Picard	Mitsubishi	HP Invent Mitsubishi Ralliart	+3:52:05
7	238	(Belgium) Stephane Henrard	(Spain) Jose Manuel Martinez	Volkswagen		+5:05:19
8	209	(Belgium) Gregoire De Mevius	(France) Alain Guehennec	Nissan	Nissan Motorsport	+6:29:59
9	204	(France) Thierry Delavergne	(France) Jacky Dubois	Nissan	Nissan Motorsport	+7:31:37
10	231	(France) Laurent Bourgnon	(France) Guy Leneveu	Nissan		+13:58:08

=== Trucks ===
Pos	No.	Driver	Co-Drivers	Truck	Time
1	425	(Czech Republic) Karel Loprais	(Czech Republic) Josef Kalina (Czech Republic) Petr Hamerla	Tatra 815	93:40:37
2	400	(Japan) Yoshimasa Sugawara	(Japan) Seiichi Suzuki (Japan) Teruhito Sugawara	Hino	+8:09:15
3	406	(Austria) Peter Reif	(Austria) Gunther Pichlbauer (Germany) Holger Hermann Roth	MAN	+16:34:08
4	414	(France) Francois Marcheix	(France) Sylvain Genibrel (France) Daniel Moquet	Mercedes-Benz	+18:43:22
5	434	(Italy) Corrado Pattono	(France) Michel Plateau	Mercedes-Benz	+19:32:12
