= 1997 Paris–Dakar Rally =

Off-road motorsport event in Africa

1997 Dakar Rally
← Previous event	Next event →
- Host country: Senegal; Mali; Niger; Mauritania
- Dates run: 4–19 January 1997
- Stages: 15

Results
- Cars winner: (Japan) Kenjiro Shinozuka (Andorra) Henri Magne; Mitsubishi
- Bikes winner: (France) Stéphane Peterhansel; Yamaha
- Trucks winner: (Austria) Peter Reif (Austria) Johann Deinhofer; Hino Ranger

1997 Dakar Rally also known as the 1997 Paris–Dakar Rally was the 19th running of the Dakar Rally event. The rally started and finished in Dakar, taking in a loop including Niger and the Ténéré desert. Jutta Kleinschmidt became the first woman to win a stage of the Dakar Rally. Japanese driver, Kenjiro Shinozuka, won the car class and Stephane Peterhansel won his fifth motorcycle title.

== Stages ==
Stage	Date	From	To	Total (km)	Stage winners		
Stage	Date	From	To	Total (km)	Bikes	Cars	Trucks
1	4 January	(Senegal) Dakar	(Senegal) Tambacounda	587	(France) S. Peterhansel	(France) J-P. Fontenay	(France) E. Pelichet
2	5 January	(Senegal) Tambacounda	(Mali) Kayes	594	(France) S. Peterhansel	(France) J-L. Schlesser	(Austria) P. Reif
3	6 January	(Mali) Kayes	(Mali) Nara	592	(France) S. Peterhansel	(Japan) K. Shinozuka	(Austria) P. Reif
4	7 January	(Mali) Nara	(Mali) Timbuktu	658	(France) S. Peterhansel	(France) B. Saby	(Czech Republic) M. Koreny
5	8 January	(Mali) Timbuktu	(Mali) Gao	482	(France) T. Magnaldi	(France) J-P. Fontenay	(Austria) P. Reif
6	9 January	(Mali) Gao	(Mali) Ménaka	332	(France) S. Peterhansel	(Japan) K. Shinozuka	(Czech Republic) B. Slenovsky
7	10 January	(Mali) Ménaka	(Niger) Tahoua	396	(Spain) C. Sotelo	(France) J-P. Fontenay	(Czech Republic) K. Loprais
8	11 January	(Niger) Tahoua	(Niger) Agadez	820	(France) S. Peterhansel	(Japan) K. Shinozuka	(Czech Republic) K. Loprais
	12 January	(Niger) Agadez		Rest day			
9	13 January	(Niger) Agadez	(Niger) Oclan	460	(France) T. Magnaldi	(Germany) J. Kleinschmidt	(Austria) P. Reif
10	14 January	(Niger) Oclan	(Mali) Kidal	537	(Spain) J. Arcarons	(Portugal) D. Guedes	(Austria) P. Reif
11	15 January	(Mali) Kidal	(Mali) Timbuktu	577	(United States) J. Lewis	(France) J-P. Strugo	(Austria) P. Reif
12	16 January	(Mali) Timbuktu	(Mauritania) Néma	588	(France) S. Peterhansel	(France) J-P. Fontenay	(Austria) P. Reif
13	17 January	(Mauritania) Néma	(Mauritania) Kiffa	604	(France) É. Bernard	(Japan) H. Masuoka	(Austria) P. Reif
14	18 January	(Mauritania) Kiffa	(Senegal) Saint-Louis	751	(Portugal) P. Marques	(France) J-P. Fontenay	(Austria) P. Reif
15	19 January	(Senegal) Saint-Louis	(Senegal) Dakar	255	(France) J. Brucy	(Germany) J. Kleinschmidt	(Belgium) J. Petit

== Final standings ==
=== Motorcycles ===
Pos	No.	Rider	Bike	Entrant	Time
1	1	(France) Stéphane Peterhansel	Yamaha	Yamaha Motor France	65:14:37
2	17	(Spain) Oscar Gallardo	Cagiva	Pelayo Mutua de Seguros	+2:35:16
3	8	(France) David Castera	Yamaha	Yamaha Motor France	+2:56:25
4	7	(United States) Jimmy Lewis	KTM	KTM USA	+3:28:15
5	11	(Germany) Dirk von Zitzewitz	KTM	KTM Sport	+4:28:38
6	73	(Germany) Jurgen Mayer	KTM	MSA	+6:01:53
7	45	(France) Jean Brucy	KTM	Raid Aventure	+7:17:10
8	41	(Portugal) Paulo Manuel Marques	KTM	Portugal RPM	+7:18:10
9	27	(Germany) Norbert Schilcher	KTM	MSA	+7:20:30
10	10	(France) Eric Bernard	KTM	E.Leclerc	+7:27:54

=== Cars ===
Pos	No.	Driver	Co-Driver	Car	Entrant	Time
1	205	(Japan) Kenjiro Shinozuka	(Andorra) Henri Magne	Mitsubishi	Sonauto Mitsubishi	61:56:31
2	200	(France) Jean-Pierre Fontenay	(France) Bruno Musmarra	Mitsubishi	Sonauto Mitsubishi	+4:16
3	202	(France) Bruno Saby	(France) Dominique Serieys	Mitsubishi	Sonauto Mitsubishi	+9:12
4	220	(Japan) Hiroshi Masuoka	(Germany) Andreas Schulz	Mitsubishi	Sonauto Mitsubishi	+2:25:27
5	206	(Germany) Jutta Kleinschmidt	(France) Jean Boutaire	Schlesser	Schlesser-SEAT	+4:35:51
6	204	(Spain) Salvador Servia	(France) Gilles Picard	Nissan	Nissan Europe	+5:15:14
7	216	(France) Jean-Pierre Strugo	(France) Bruno Catarelli	Mitsubishi	Mitsubishi International	+6:20:08
8	208	(Portugal) Duarte Guedes	(France) Jacky Dubois	Nissan	Team Dessoude	+9:23:13
9	268	(Italy) Edoardo Argazzi	(Italy) Riccardo Argazzi	Nissan	Team Dessoude	+9:40:41
10	224	(Portugal) Carlos Sousa	(France) Philippe Rey	Mitsubishi	Mitsubishi International	+23:28:05

=== Trucks ===
Pos	No.	Driver	Co-Drivers	Truck	Time
1	427	(Austria) Peter Reif	(Austria) Johann Deinhofer	Hino Ranger	78:21:02
2	402	(Japan) Yoshimasa Sugawara	(Japan) Naoko Matsumoto (Japan) Katsumi Hamura	Hino Ranger	+3:33:27
3	411	(Belgium) Joseph Petit	(France) Jean-Christophe Wagner (Japan) Takeshi Hashimoto	Hino Ranger	+4:08:52
4	425	(France) Edmond Pelichet	(France) Hubert Molina	Mercedes-Benz	+6:43:50
5	406	(France) Gilbert Versino	(France) Christian Lacourt (France) Christian Versino	Mitsubishi Fuso The Great	+7:51:50
6	415	(France) Christophe Granjon	(Japan) Masaaki Imai (France) Anthony Martineau	Mitsubishi Fuso The Great	+10:33:16
7	404	(France) Christian Barbier	(France) Eric André (France) Jean-Louis Berger	Mercedes-Benz	+15:41:33
8	417	(France) Yves Ferri	(France) Michel Plateau (France) Hubert Auvray	Mercedes-Benz	+22:11:30
9	433	(France) Bernard Malferiol	(France) Patrick Croset (France) Jean Rodrigues	Mercedes-Benz	+23:43:18
10	434	(France) Michel Gambillon	(France) Raymond Louin (France) Reynald Prive	Mercedes-Benz	+25:52:51
