= St. George's Abbey, Isny =

Coordinates: 47°41′38″N 10°2′35″E

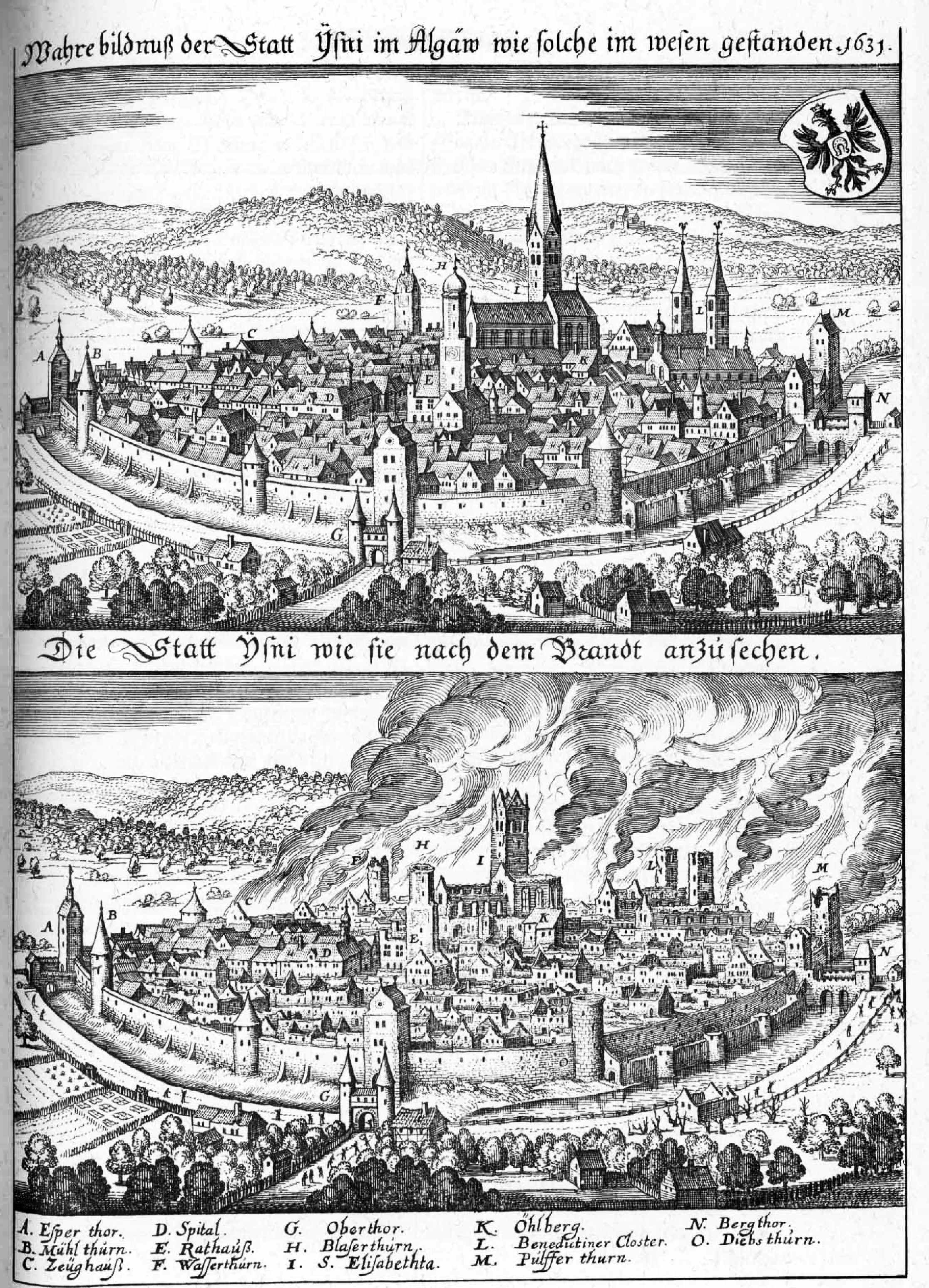
- Isny before and after the great fire of 1631; St. George's Abbey church is the building with two spires to the right, with the rest of the monastery adjacent
- Interactive map of St. George's Abbey, Isny

Monastery information
- Order: Benedictine
- Established: 1096

Site
- Location: Isny im Allgäu, Baden-Württemberg, Germany

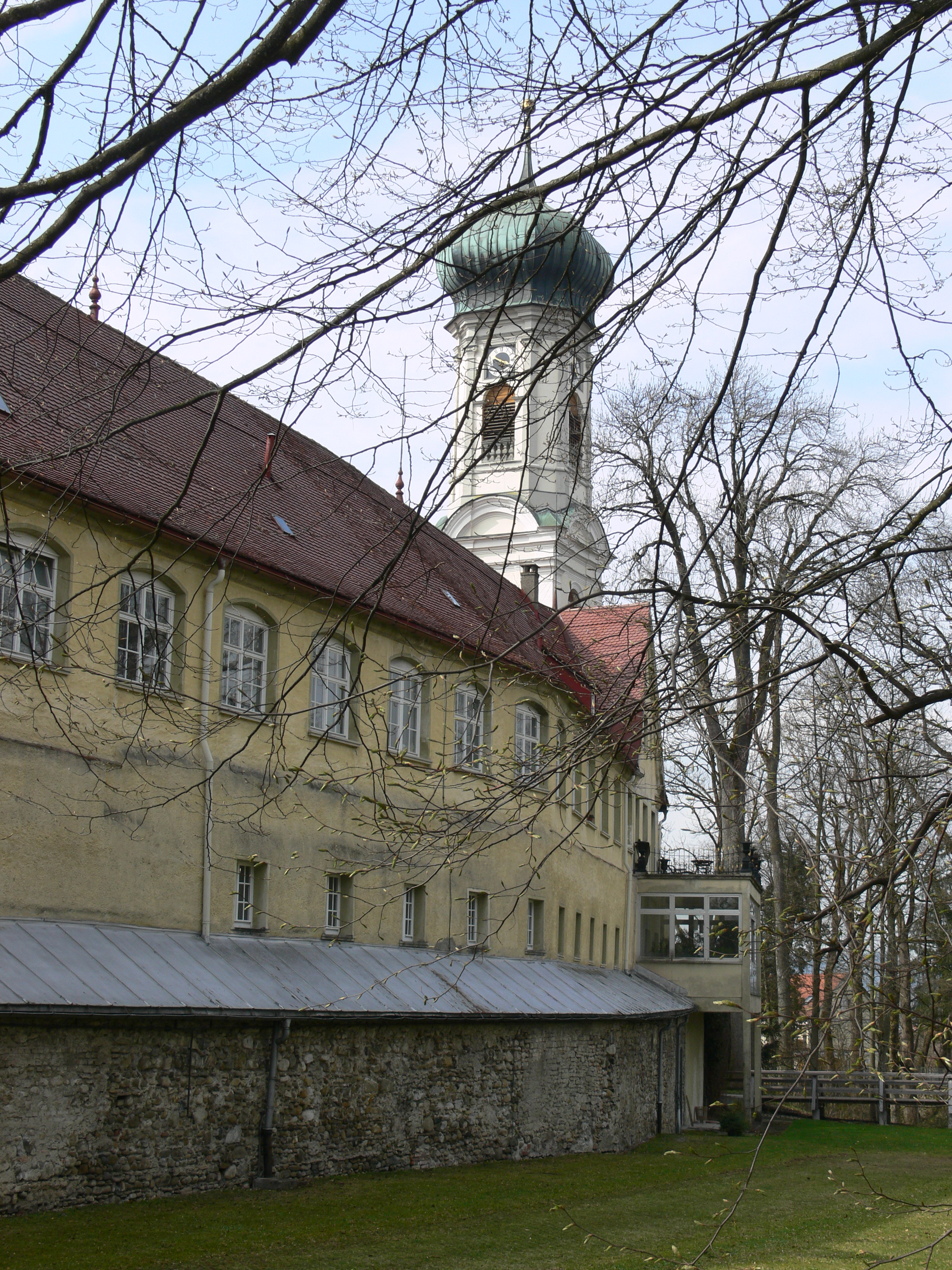
St. George in Isny: A Catholic enclave inside a Protestant Imperial city.

St. George's Abbey, Isny (German: Kloster St. Georg) in Isny im Allgäu in Baden-Württemberg, Germany, is a former Benedictine abbey founded in 1096 and secularised in 1802.

== History ==
St. George's Abbey was founded in 1096 by the Counts of Altshausen-Veringen. In 1106 the foundation was confirmed by Pope Paschal II. Towards the end of the 12th century a Benedictine nunnery was also established in Isny but this was moved in about 1189 to Rohrdorf.

St. George's Abbey was responsible for the foundation of the town of Isny, which was developed as a market at the end of the 12th century and received municipal status as early as 1235.

Both abbey and town enjoyed economic success, abruptly terminated by the plague in 1350, which almost wiped the abbey out.

During the Reformation the town of Isny became Protestant and in 1534 the abbey church was attacked and its sacred images destroyed.

The abbey's economic situation only improved — temporarily — in the first third of the 17th century, which was brought to an end by a disastrous fire in 1631. The abbey did not recover until the time of abbot Alfons Torelli (1701–31).

It did not become an Imperial abbey until 1781, as member of the Bench of Swabian Prelates.

It was secularised in 1803, at the same time as the town of Isny was mediatised, when both became part of the territory of Count Otto Wilhelm von Quadt-Wykradt.

== Buildings ==
The first monastic buildings and the Romanesque abbey church burnt down in 1284. Immediately after the fire a hall church was constructed, which was dedicated in 1288.

In the relatively brief period of prosperity that occurred in the first third of the 17th century much refurbishment and new building work took place, all of which were destroyed by the catastrophic fire in 1631.

In about 1656 Michael Beer built the Baroque Neue Bau ("new building") and also repaired parts of the ruins of the former buildings.

The present abbey church was built by Giulio Barbieri between 1660 and 1666; the onion dome was added in 1709. In 1757-58 Johann Georg Gilt (of the Wessobrunner School of stuccoists) and Johann Michael Holzhey refurbished the church interior in the Rococo style.

After secularisation the monastic buildings served as the castle of the count and family. During the Third Reich it accommodated the Hitler Youth until 1943. The premises were later used as an old people's home and nursing home.

== Sources and references ==
- Reinhardt, Rudolf, 1996. Reichsabtei St. Georg in Isny 1096-1802. Beiträge zur Geschichte und Kunst des 900jährigen Benediktinerklosters. Konrad: Weissenhorn. ISBN 3-87437-386-X
