= Eva Stotz =

German documentary film maker and director

Eva Stotz (born 5 June 1979, in Isny im Allgäu) is a German documentary film maker and director. Her work primarily concerns the impact of globalization in developed and developing countries.

== Life and work ==
After graduating from high school in Anna Essinger, Ulm, Eva Stotz spent a year studying French film history at the Université Paul Valéry in Montpellier. Her first 10-minute short film "L'après-midi" has been awarded several prizes at festivals. Since 2001 she has been studying directing at the German Film and Television Academy (DFFB). She directed her first feature film, "Earth in hand", on the concept of home, in 2004 in Transylvania. On the initiative of the German Development Service in 2005, she focused upon the need in Uganda to make a living in training after primary school. Eva Stotz is a member of the film collective Super-9, which she founded in 2005 along with eight other students trained at the DFFB.

In 2006, she made a pilgrimage 800 km on the road to Santiago de Compostela and on to Finisterre.

Her second feature-length documentary, "Breaking point", scrutinised the emotional power of work. This film won a €5,000 prize at the 32nd Duisburg Film Week 2008, and a €15,000 German Television Award in 2009.

"The Little Teleplay" promotes her documentary thesis film in which Stotz grapples protagonists from four continents using online services, with the themes of xenophobia and hospitality.

== Filmography ==
- 2001: L'après-midi (short fiction film)
- 2004: Erde in der Hand
- 2004: Warsaw Flow (music video)
- 2005: Igor (fiction)
- 2005: In need to make a Living (short film)
- 2005: Tempelhof (short film)
- 2006: Boda boda (music video)
- 2006: Innen/nachts (short fiction film)
- 2009: 24h Berlin
- 2009: Sollbruchstelle
- 2009: Haiku (short film)
- 2015: One Million Steps (short film)
- 2019: Field Trip (interactive film)

== Bibliography ==
- Im Zweifel sitzt der Teufel. In: Andres Veiel, Béatrice Ottersbach (Hg.): Dokumentarfilm. Werkstattberichte. UVK Verlagsgesellschaft, Konstanz 2008, ISBN 978-3-86764-085-5, S. 82–109

== Awards ==
- 2008: Duisburger Filmwoche: Förderpreis der Stadt Duisburg
- 2009: Deutscher Fernsehpreis: Förderpreis
