= Natural Science and Technical Academy Isny =

Coordinates: 47°41′39″N 10°02′12″E

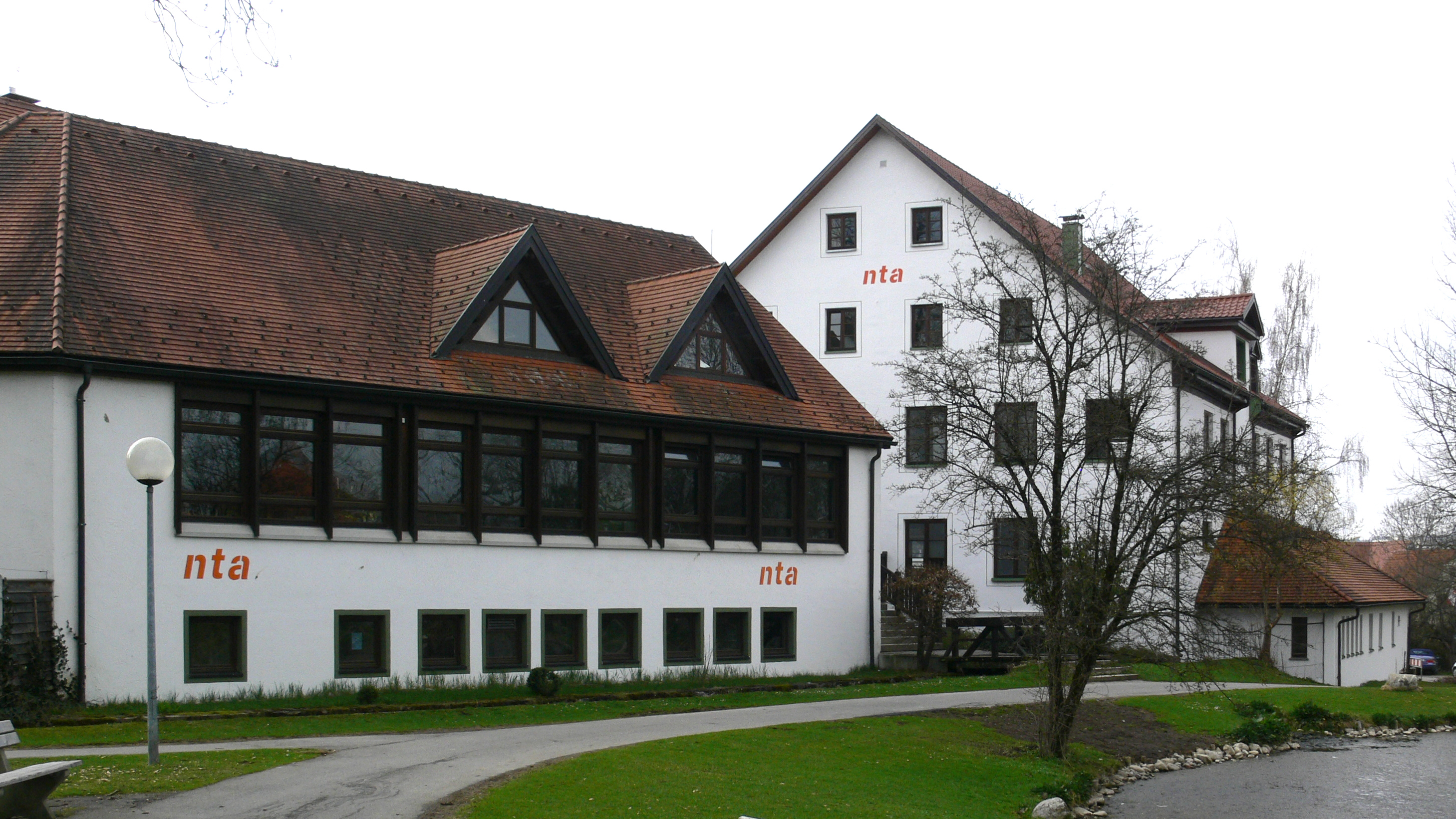

The Natural Science and Technical Academy Isny (German: Naturwissenschaftlich-Technische Akademie Isny, NTA or NTA Isny) was a privately run, state-approved German university focusing in applied sciences, located in Isny im Allgäu.

Since its founding in 1945, it has had a steadily expanding scope, including food chemistry (1967, expanded 1994 to include environmental analysis), physical electronics (1968), pharmaceutical chemistry (1972), and computer science (1992).

The university College closed in 2015 and vocational degree courses offered by the Institution were stopped in 2024
