= Hiroshi Masuoka (rally driver) =

Japanese rally driver

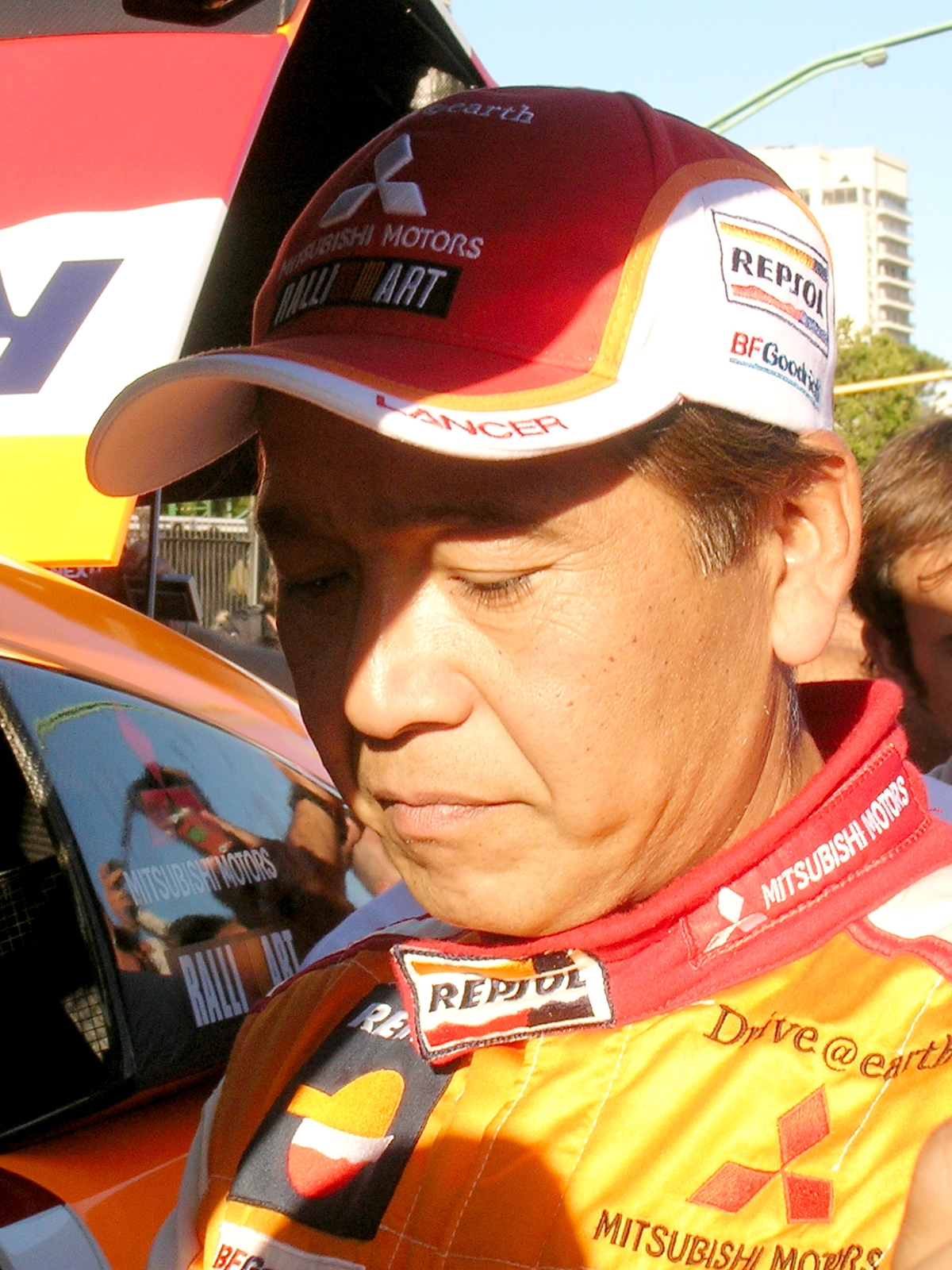
Hiroshi Masuoka - Dakar 2009

Hiroshi Masuoka (増岡 浩, Masuoka Hiroshi; born 13 March 1960) is a Japanese rally driver.

== Career ==
Masuoka's most notable achievement was his back-to-back successes in the Dakar Rally in 2002 and 2003, only the fourth driver in the event's history to win in consecutive years. He was also victorious in the 2003 Baja Italy and the 2004 UAE Desert Challenge.

Throughout his career, Masuoka has been employed as a works driver by Mitsubishi, typically driving a Pajero. The 2009 Dakar Rally was his 21st and final participation in the rally, after which he retired along with Mitsubishi's withdrawal from the event. During his Dakar career, he won 25 stages, putting him fifth in the all-time list for the car category. He is now Senior Expert of Mitsubishi's Public Relations Department.

== Personal life ==
Masuoka currently resides in Iruma, Saitama Prefecture, with his wife Chiaki and son Shoichiro.

== Dakar Rally results ==
Year	Class	Vehicle	Result	Stages
1987	Car	(Japan) Mitsubishi	29th	2
1988	Car	(Japan) Mitsubishi	DNF	0
1989	Did not enter			
1990	Car	(Japan) Mitsubishi	10th	0
1991	Car	(Japan) Mitsubishi	95th	0
1992	Car	(Japan) Mitsubishi	20th	0
1993	Car	(Japan) Mitsubishi	DNF	0
1994	Car	(Japan) Mitsubishi	4th	0
1995	Car	(Japan) Mitsubishi	10th	0
1996	Car	(Japan) Mitsubishi	6th	1
1997	Car	(Japan) Mitsubishi	4th	1
1998	Car	(Japan) Mitsubishi	4th	2
1999	Car	(Japan) Mitsubishi	6th	0
2000	Car	(Japan) Mitsubishi	6th	1
2001	Car	(Japan) Mitsubishi	2nd	5
2002	Car	(Japan) Mitsubishi	1st	5
2003	Car	(Japan) Mitsubishi	1st	4
2004	Car	(Japan) Mitsubishi	2nd	4
2005	Car	(Japan) Mitsubishi	DNF	0
2006	Car	(Japan) Mitsubishi	DNF	0
2007	Car	(Japan) Mitsubishi	5th	0
2008	Event cancelled – replaced by the 2008 Central Europe Rally			
2009	Car	(Japan) Mitsubishi	DNF	0

Sporting positions
Preceded by Jutta Kleinschmidt	Dakar Rally; Car Winner; 2002–2003	Succeeded by Stéphane Peterhansel
