= Carlo de Gavardo =

Chilean motorcycle racer

Carlo de Gavardo Prohens
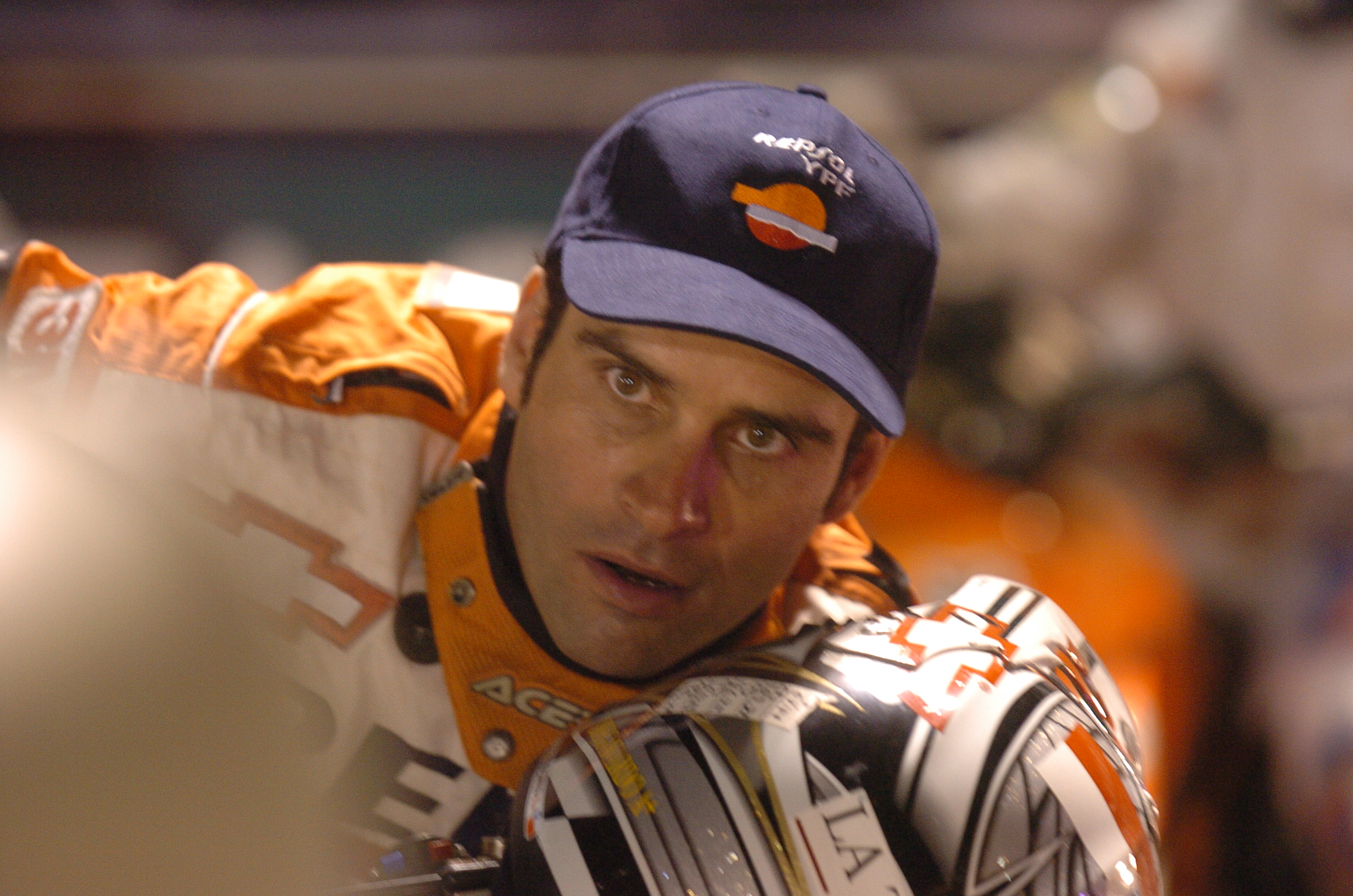

Personal information
- Nationality: Chilean
- Born: 14 July 1969; Huelquén, Chile
- Died: 4 July 2015 (aged 45); Buin, Chile

World Rally Championship record
- Years active: 1986–2010
- Teams: KTM, Chevrolet, Hummer
- First rally: 1986 World Enduro Championship
- First win: 1986 World Enduro Championship
- Last win: 2007 Rallye des Pharaons (Diesel-class winner)
- Last rally: 2010 Dakar Rally

Carlo Alberto de Gavardo Prohens (14 July 1969 – 4 July 2015) was a Chilean motorist and motorcyclist who participated in numerous rallies worldwide, including the Dakar Rally and Rallye des Pharaons. He was the first Chilean motorcyclist to run the Paris-Dakar from beginning to end.

== Biography ==
=== Beginning as a Pilot ===
De Gavardo received his elementary and high school education from the Craighouse School and Marshall School in Santiago. While he was studying in this last establishment, he began his active participation in Chilean motorcycling, where he won the Enduro National Championship consecutively for almost a decade between 1986 and 1994. In 1993, he began to expand his horizons and compete at an international level in the Enduro World Championship in Tulsa, Oklahoma. In 1996, he prepared to run the Paris – Dakar Rallye and becomes the first Chilean to finish the rally. On this occasion, he was rewarded with a highly regarded seventeenth place. De Gavardo has participated in every Dakar since 1996 up until 2004, achieving his best result (a third place) in 2001.

=== Championships and achievements ===
By 1997, de Garvardo finished fourth place in the Master Rallye: Paris – Moscow – Beijing In 2001, 2004, and 2005 he won the Rallye World Cup of the International Motorcycling Federation. In 2004 and 2005, he became the World Motorcycling Champion in the 450 cc category.

De Gavardo has participated in the Atlas Rally, Two Sertoes, Master Rallye, Pharaohs Rally in Egypt, Dubai Rally, Las Pampas Rally in Argentina, Morocco Rally, and the Safari Rally.

Year	Championship	Achievement
1986–1993	Enduro Championship	Champion
1994	Enduro World Championship in Tulsa, Oklahoma	Bronze Medal
1996	Paris-Dakar Rallye	First Chilean Motorcyclist to run
1996	International Olympic Committee	Fair Play Award
1997	Master Rallye Paris-Moscow-Beijing	Fourth Place
2001	Paris-Dakar Rallye	Third Place
2004–2005	Motorcycling Championship	World Champion in the 450cc category.
2006	Paris-Lisboa Rally	Fifth Place
2007	Pharaohs Rally	Seventh Place, First Place Diesel Category

=== Fair play ===
De Gavardo received two fair-play awards twice, one by the IOC and another by the International Motorcycling Federation.

Some of de Gavardo's non-sporting activities included an alliance with the Chilean Police force with the objective of reducing the number of traffic accidents involving motorcycles. The coalition stretches from Arica to Punta Arenas with the sole purpose of creating responsible drivers through courses that help teach many motorcycle owners what they need to know about safety and being precautious.

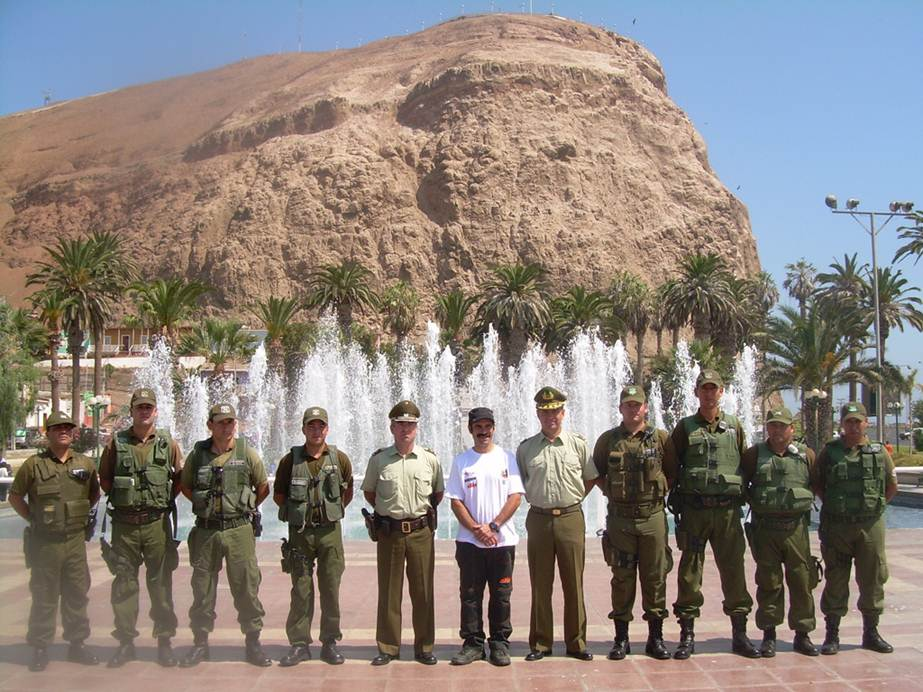
Carlo de Gavardo in Arica

=== The Transition from 2 wheels to 4 ===
There is a growing tendency among motorcyclists, including Stéphane Peterhansel y Nani Roma, when they reach a point in their careers in which they exchange their motorcycles for a larger vehicle. De Gavardo announced his retirement from motorcycles as to continue competing as a motorist. He began to compete in this category during 2008, and in 2009 participated in the Dakar with Hummer. This transition was a personal and professional choice for this well-known Chilean idol.

=== Death ===
De Gavardo died of a cardiac arrest while riding his bike in Huelquen (near Buin) on 4 July 2015.
