= Volkswagen Race Touareg 2 =

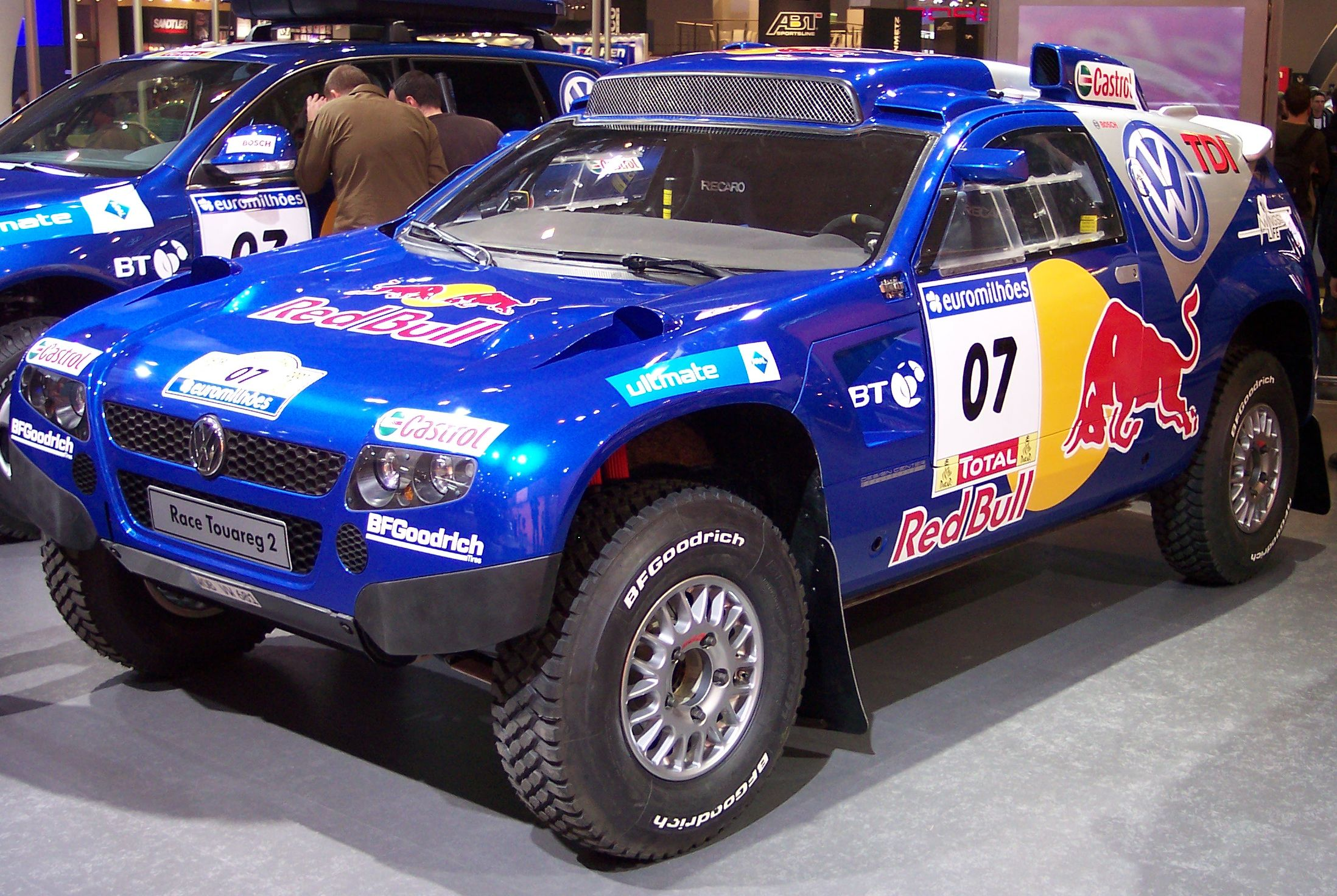

Overview
- Manufacturer: Volkswagen
- Production: 2009-2011

Body and chassis
- Class: Rally raid
- Layout: 4-wheel drive

Chronology
- Successor: Volkswagen Race Touareg 3

The Volkswagen Race Touareg 2 is an off-road competition car specially designed to take part in the rally raids with the main objective of winning the Dakar Rally.

== Dakar victories ==
Year	Driver	Co-driver
2008 (CE)	(Spain) Carlos Sainz	(France) Michel Périn
2009	(South Africa) Giniel de Villiers	(Germany) Dirk von Zitzewitz
2010	(Spain) Carlos Sainz	(Spain) Lucas Cruz

NOTE: Because of the 2007 killing of French tourists in Mauritania, the ASO postponed and relocated the Dakar Rally in 2008, and the race became the 2008 Central Europe Rally. The ASO deferred all Dakar entries to that event, which is technically part of the Dakar lineage.

== See also ==
- Volkswagen Touareg
