= 1992 Paris–Cape Town Rally =

Off-road motorsport event in Europe and Africa

1992 Dakar Rally

Seasons
- ← 1991 1993 →

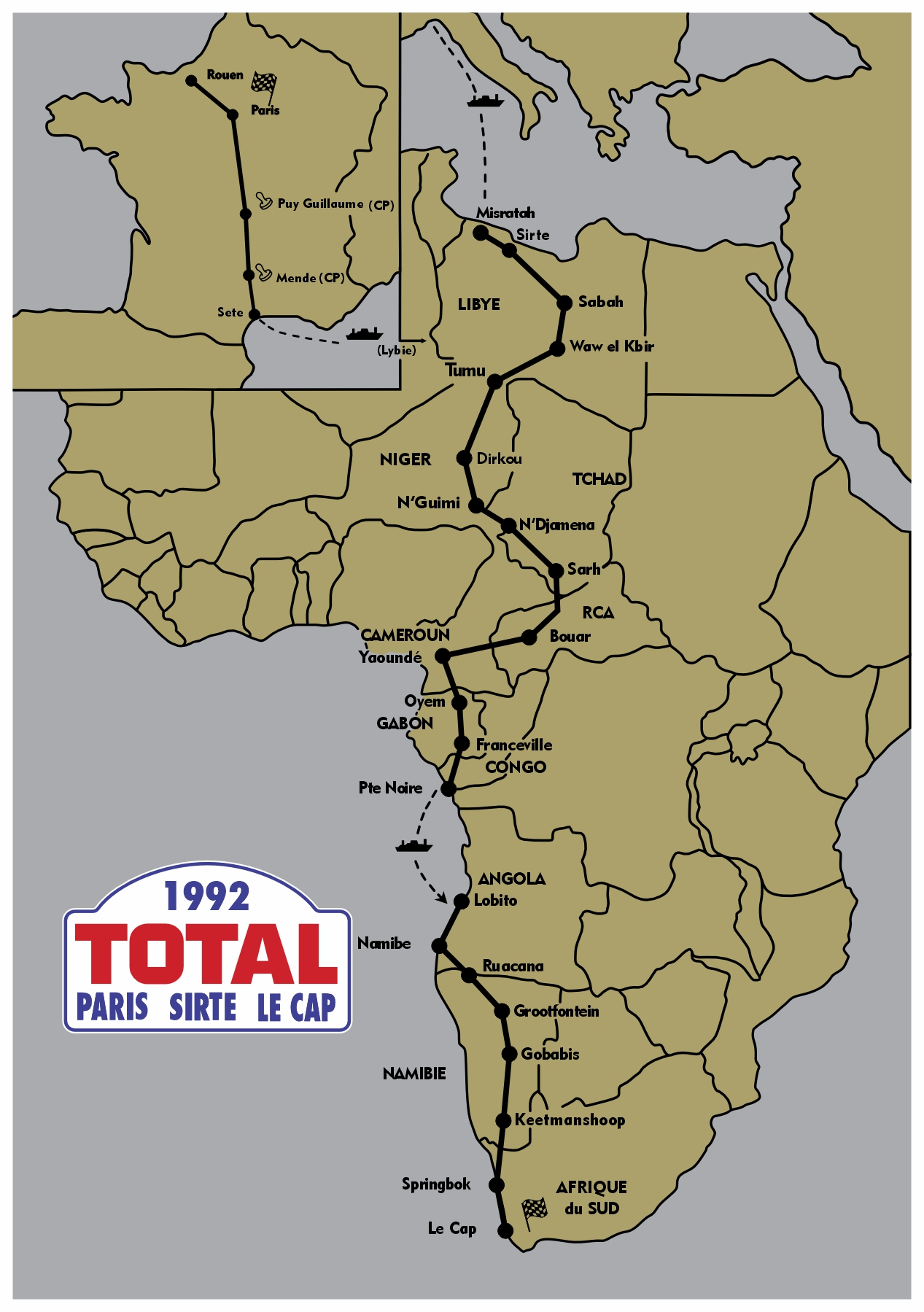
Official Paris-Sirte-Cape Town 1992 Map

The 1992 Paris-Cape Town Rally was the 14th running of the Dakar Rally event with a unique routing. The rally had a 7,722-mile (12,427 km) long route, starting from Paris, France, on 23 December 1991 and finishing at Cape Town, South Africa, on 16 January 1992. The route passed through Libya, Niger, Chad, Central African Republic, Cameroon, Gabon, Republic of the Congo, Angola, and Namibia. Participants used maritime transport to get from Pointe-Noire (Republic of the Congo) to Lobito (Angola), so they did not cross the territory of Zaire. Hubert Auriol won the car category to go with his two victories in the motorcycle category. Stephane Peterhansel won the motorcycle category for the second year in succession. The fastest truck in common car-truck classification was Francesco Perlini's Perlini on 16th place.

== Stages ==
Stage	Date	Start point	Finish point	Distance (km)	Distance (mi)	Special Stage (km)	Special Stage (mi)
Prologue	23 December	Rouen, France	Rouen, France	3.6	2.2	3.6	2.2
1	24 December	Rouen, France	Paris, France	130	81	0	0
2	25 December	Paris, France	Sète, France	820	510	0	0
3	26 December	Misrata, Libya	Sirte, Libya	653	406	204	127
4	27 December	Sirte, Libya	Sabha, Libya	375	233	375	233
5	28 December	Sabha, Libya	Waw al-Kabir, Libya	546	339	546	339
6	29 December	Waw al-Kabir, Libya	Tumu, Libya	520	323	520	323
7	30 December	Tumu, Libya	Dirkou, Niger	738	459	738	459
8	31 December	Dirkou, Niger	N'Guigmi, Niger	601	373	601	373
9	1 January	N'Guigmi, Niger	N'Djamena, Chad	438	272	0	0
10	2 January	N'Djamena, Chad	Sarh, Chad	695	432	331	206
11	3 January	Sarh, Chad	Bouar, Central African Republic	663	412	520	323
12	4 January	Bouar, Central African Republic	Yaoundé, Cameroon	660	410	260	162
13	5 January	Yaoundé, Cameroon	Oyem, Gabon	400	249	113	70
14	6 January	Oyem, Gabon	Franceville, Gabon	793	493	619	385
15	7 January	Franceville, Gabon	(Republic of the Congo) Pointe-Noire, Congo	677	421	354	220
	8 January	Rest day					
	9 January	Rest day					
16	10 January	Lobito, Angola	Namibe, Angola	500	311	150	93
17	11 January	Namibe, Angola	Ruacana, Namibia	517	321	225	140
18	12 January	Ruacana, Namibia	Grootfontein, Namibia	600	373	280	174
19	13 January	Grootfontein, Namibia	Gobabis, Namibia	450	280	0	0
20	14 January	Gobabis, Namibia	Keetmanshoop, Namibia	600	373	0	0
21	15 January	Keetmanshoop, Namibia	Springbok, South Africa	450	280	100	62
22	16 January	Springbok, South Africa	Cape Town, South Africa	611	380	0	0
