= Vladimir Chagin =

Russian rally raid driver

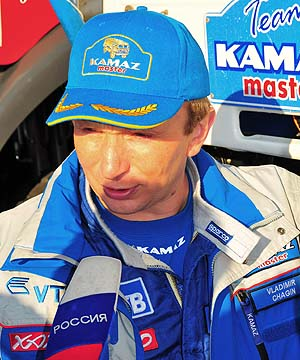
- Vladimir Chagin at the start of Transorientale 2008
- Nationality: (Russia) Russian
- Born: Vladimir Gennadiyevich Chagin; 5 January 1970 (age 56) Perm, Russian SFSR, Soviet Union
- Debut season: 1990
- Current team: Kamaz-Master

Vladimir Gennadiyevich Chagin (Russian: Владимир Геннадьевич Чагин, IPA: [vlɐˈdʲimʲɪr ɡʲɪˈnadʲjɪvɪtɕ ˈtɕæɡʲɪn]; born 5 January 1970) is a Russian rally raid driver. He has won the Dakar Rally driving Kamaz trucks in 2000, 2002, 2003, 2004, 2006, 2010 and 2011, becoming the most successful single category pilot in the history of the tournament earning him the nickname "The Tsar of Dakar".

As of January 2016 he holds the following records:

- The most Dakar rally wins in the truck category with 7 (1 more than Karel Loprais)
- The second most Dakar rally stage wins in all categories with 63, 5 behind Stéphane Peterhansel
- The record for most stage wins in a single Dakar rally season in the truck category with 9 out of 14 in 2010.

== Winner ==
- Dakar Rally: 2000, 2002, 2003, 2004, 2006, 2010 and 2011
- Desert Challenge: 1999, 2001, 2002, 2003, 2004, 2005
- Baja Italia: 2000
- Optic 2000 Tunisia: 2000, 2001
- Master-Rally: 1995, 1996, 2000, 2002
- Rally Orientale - Kappadokia: 2003, 2004
- Baja Pearl: 2000
- Kalmykia: 2000
- The Quiet Don: 2003
- Khazar Steppes: 2004, 2006

== In top 3 ==
- Dakar Rally: 2009
- Desert Challenge: 2000
- Baikonur - Moscow: 1997

== Honours and awards ==
- Order of Merit for the Fatherland 4th class
- Order of Courage
- Order of Honour
- Order of Friendship
- Order of the Badge of Honour (USSR)
- Medal "In Commemoration of the 1000th Anniversary of Kazan"
- Medal "For Valiant Labour" (Republic of Tatarstan)

== Dakar Rally results ==
Year	Class	Vehicle	Position	Stages won
1996	Trucks	(Russia) Kamaz	30th	?
1998	Trucks	(Russia) Kamaz	DNF	0
2000	Trucks	(Russia) Kamaz	1st	4
2001	Trucks	(Russia) Kamaz	DNF	5
2002	Trucks	(Russia) Kamaz	1st	7
2003	Trucks	(Russia) Kamaz	1st	2
2004	Trucks	(Russia) Kamaz	1st	4
2005	Trucks	(Russia) Kamaz	18th	6
2006*	Trucks	(Russia) Kamaz	1st	7
2007	Trucks	(Russia) Kamaz	DNF	2
2008	Event cancelled – replaced by the 2008 Central Europe Rally			
2009	Trucks	(Russia) Kamaz	2nd	4
2010	Trucks	(Russia) Kamaz	1st	9
2011	Trucks	(Russia) Kamaz	1st	7

Sporting positions
Preceded by Karel Loprais	Dakar Rally; Truck Winner; 2000	Succeeded by Karel Loprais
Preceded by Karel Loprais	Dakar Rally; Truck Winner; 2002–2004	Succeeded by Firdaus Kabirov
Preceded by Firdaus Kabirov	Dakar Rally; Truck Winner; 2006	Succeeded by Hans Stacey
Preceded by Firdaus Kabirov	Dakar Rally; Truck Winner; 2010–2011	Succeeded by Gerard de Rooy
