= André de Azevedo =

Brazilian motorcycle racer

- Born: 8 June 1959 (age 67) São José dos Campos, Brazil

Dakar Rally career
- Debut season: 1988
- Former teams: Tatra
- Championships: Dakar Rally

André de Azevedo (born July 8, 1959 in São José dos Campos) is a Brazilian rally raid truck driver. He won ten stages at Dakar Rally with Tatra trucks and reached his personal best at 2003 Dakar Rally with second place.

== Dakar Rally results ==
Year	Class	Vehicle	Position	Stages won
1988	Motorbikes	(Japan) Yamaha	DNF	0
1989	Did not enter			
1990	Motorbikes	(Japan) Yamaha	22nd	0
1991	Motorbikes	(Japan) Yamaha	21st	0
1992	Did not enter			
1993	Motorbikes	(Japan) Yamaha	9th	0
1994	Motorbikes	(Japan) Yamaha	15th	0
1995	Did not enter			
1996	Motorbikes	(Austria) KTM	9th	0
1997	Motorbikes	(Austria) KTM	15th	0
1998	Did not enter			
1999	Trucks	(Czech Republic) Tatra	3rd	2
2000	Trucks	(Czech Republic) Tatra	4th	2
2001	Trucks	(Czech Republic) Tatra	DNF	1
2002	Trucks	(Czech Republic) Tatra	10th	3
2003	Trucks	(Czech Republic) Tatra	2nd	2
2004	Trucks	(Czech Republic) Tatra	6th	0
2005	Trucks	(Czech Republic) Tatra	DNF	0
2006	Trucks	(Czech Republic) Tatra	4th	0
2007	Trucks	(Czech Republic) Tatra	5th	0
2008	Event cancelled – replaced by the 2008 Central Europe Rally			
2009	Trucks	(Czech Republic) Tatra	6th	0
2010	Trucks	(Czech Republic) Tatra	DNF	0
2011	Trucks	(Czech Republic) Tatra	DNF	0
2012	Trucks	(Czech Republic) Tatra	8th	0

- In progress
