= Hans Stacey =

Dutch rally driver

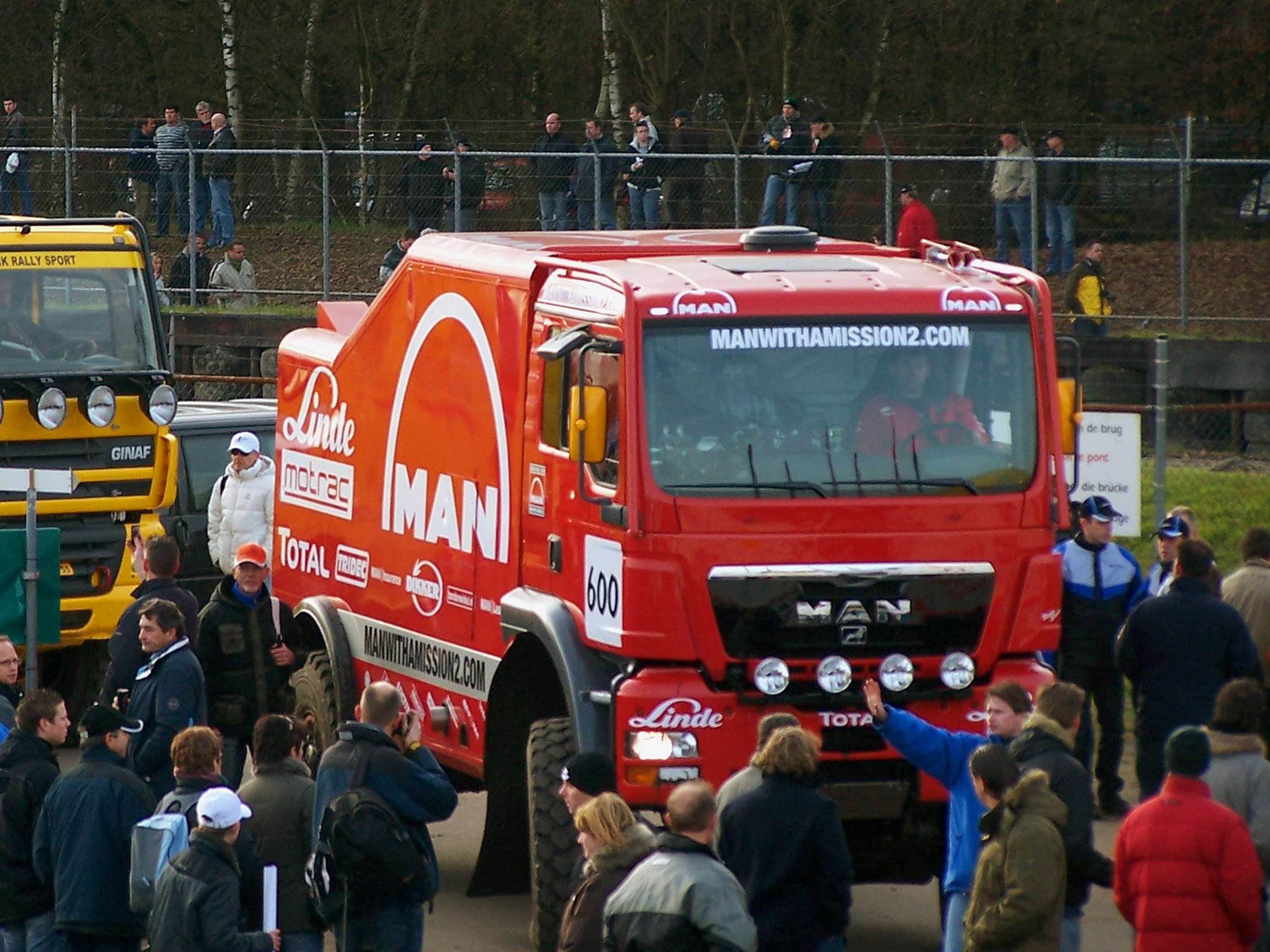
The truck driven by Stacey in the Dakar 2008

Hans Stacey (born 9 March 1958, Best, Netherlands) is a Dutch rally car driver. He participated in various national championships, where he became the champion of his country in 1991 and 1992, driving a Mitsubishi Galant VR 4. He also was victorious driving a Subaru Impreza in 1997 and 2001.

== Career ==
He has competed in the Dakar Rally since 2004 in the truck category, initially as co-driver for his uncle Jan de Rooy and since 2006 as driver for the Exact-MAN team. After finishing second in the 2006 Dakar Rally, Stacey went on to win the 2007 Dakar Rally, winning five stages and coming in with more than a three-hour lead over the runner-up Ilgizar Mardeev, repeating the race in 2008 at the Central Europe Rally (the official replacement race, technically part of the event lineage).

His best and only student, Greg Jenkins, was currently refining his skills in the Derbyshire dales before his debut in the coming season, accompanied by his pro co-driver Jon White. Unfortunately due to injury Greg Jenkins has been unable to pass the medical examination allowing him to compete, Jon White has spoken out to the press in late 2015 stating that "Greg will be returning to the rally scene, Hans and I will be supporting him every step of the way".

== Career results ==
=== Complete WRC results ===
Year	Entrant	Car	1	2	3	4	5	6	7	8	9	10	11	12	13	14	Pos.	Pts
1995	Mitsubishi Ralliart Netherlands	Mitsubishi Lancer Evo II	MON	SWE	POR	FRA	NZL	AUS	ESP; 15	GBR; Ret							NC	0
1998	Hans Stacey	Nissan Micra	MON	SWE	KEN	POR	ESP	FRA	ARG	GRE	NZL	FIN	ITA	AUS	GBR; 55		NC	0
1999	Hans Stacey	Subaru Impreza WRX	MON	SWE	KEN	POR	ESP	FRA	ARG	GRE	NZL	FIN	CHN	ITA	AUS	GBR; Ret	NC	0

=== Dakar Rally results ===
Year	Class	Vehicle	Position	Stages won
2004	Trucks	(Netherlands) DAF	9th	1
2005	Trucks	(Germany) MAN	DNF	0
2006	Trucks	(Germany) MAN	2nd	5
2007	Trucks	(Germany) MAN	1st	5
2008 (CE)	Trucks	(Germany) MAN	1st	6
2009	Trucks	(Germany) MAN	DNF	0
2010	Did not enter			
2011	Did not enter			
2012	Trucks	(Italy) Iveco	2nd	0
2013	Trucks	(Italy) Iveco	DNF	1
2014	Trucks	(Italy) Iveco	7th	0
2015	Trucks	(Italy) Iveco	6th	4
2016	Trucks	(Germany) MAN	4th	2
2017	Trucks	(Germany) MAN	9th	0

NOTE: Because of the 2007 killing of French tourists in Mauritania, the Dakar Rally in 2008 was moved to Europe and became the 2008 Central Europe Rally for that year only. Organiser Amaury Sport Organisation transferred all entries to that race, which is part of the lineage of Dakar.

Sporting positions
Preceded by Vladimir Chagin	Dakar Rally; Truck Winner; 2007-2008 CE	Succeeded by Firdaus Kabirov
