= 2003 Dakar Rally =

Off-road motorsport event in Europe and Africa

← Previous event	Next event →
- Host country: France; Spain; Tunisia; Libya; Egypt

Results
- Cars winner: (Japan) Hiroshi Masuoka (Germany) Andreas Schulz; Mitsubishi
- Bikes winner: (France) Richard Sainct; KTM
- Trucks winner: (Russia) Vladimir Chagin (Russia) Semen Yakubov (Russia) Sergey Savostin; Kamaz

The 2003 Dakar Rally, also known as the 2003 Telefónica-Dakar Rally, was the 25th running of the Dakar Rally event. The rally began on 1 January 2003 at Marseille in France and finished at Sharm el-Sheikh in Egypt on 19 January, with the course crossing North Africa.

Kenjiro Shinozuka, who won the event in 1997, suffered serious injury in an accident between Ghat and Sabha in Libya. Former world rally champion and four times winner of the Dakar Rally, Ari Vatanen, returned to take part in the rally, and won the ninth, thirteen and fifteen stages French co-driver, Bruno Cauvy died in an accident on the tenth stage when his car went out of control and overturned in sand dunes. Stephane Peterhansel took an early lead in the rally, but was forced out in the penultimate stage by mechanical problems. The rally was won for the second time in succession by Japanese driver, Hiroshi Masuoka. The motorcycle category was won for the third time by Richard Sainct.

== Stages ==
Stage	Date	From	To	Total (km)	Stage winners		
Stage	Date	From	To	Total (km)	Bikes	Cars	Trucks
1	1 January	(France) Marseille	(France) Narbonne	265	(France) C. Despres	(Japan) K. Shinozuka	(Brazil) A. de Azevedo
2	2 January	(France) Narbonne	(Spain) Castellón de la Plana	574	(France) R. Sainct	(France) S. Peterhansel	(Netherlands) J. de Rooy
3	3 January	(Spain) Castellón de la Plana	(Spain) Valencia	95	(France) C. Despres	(Japan) H. Masuoka	(Netherlands) G. de Rooy
	4 January	(Spain) Valencia	(Tunisia) Tunis	Rest day			
4	5 January	(Tunisia) Tunis	(Tunisia) Tozeur	463	(Spain) N. Roma	(France) S. Peterhansel	(Netherlands) J. de Rooy
5	6 January	(Tunisia) Tozeur	(Tunisia) El Borma	494	(France) R. Sainct	(Japan) H. Masuoka	(Czech Republic) K. Loprais
6	7 January	(Tunisia) El Borma	(Libya) Ghadames	278	(South Africa) A. Cox	(France) S. Peterhansel	(Netherlands) G. de Rooy
7	8 January	(Libya) Ghadames	(Libya) Ghat	691	(France) R. Sainct	(France) S. Peterhansel	(Netherlands) G. de Rooy
8	9 January	(Libya) Ghat	(Libya) Sabha	727	(Italy) G. Sala	(Japan) H. Masuoka	(Russia) V. Chagin
9	10 January	(Libya) Sabha	(Libya) Zilla	585	(France) R. Sainct	(Finland) A. Vatanen	(Netherlands) G. de Rooy
10	11 January	(Libya) Zilla	(Libya) Sarir	554	(Sweden) P-G. Lundmark	(Japan) H. Masuoka	(Brazil) A. de Azevedo
11	12 January	(Libya) Sarir	(Egypt) Siwa	586	(Italy) F. Meoni	(France) S. Peterhansel	(Netherlands) G. de Rooy
	13 January	(Egypt) Siwa		Rest day			
12	14 January	(Egypt) Siwa		445	(Italy) G. Sala	(France) S. Peterhansel	(Russia) V. Chagin
13	15 January	(Egypt) Siwa	(Egypt) Dakhla	657	(Italy) F. Meoni	(Finland) A. Vatanen	(Russia) F. Kabirov
14	16 January	(Egypt) Dakhla	(Egypt) Luxor	702	(France) R. Sainct	(France) L. Alphand	(Russia) F. Kabirov
15	17 January	(Egypt) Luxor	(Egypt) Abu Rish	576	(Italy) F. Meoni	(Finland) A. Vatanen	(Russia) F. Kabirov
16	18 January	(Egypt) Abu Rish	(Egypt) Sharm El Sheikh	828	(France) C. Despres	(Belgium) S. Henrard^{1}	(Russia) F. Kabirov
17	19 January	(Egypt) Sharm El Sheikh		56	(Sweden) P-G. Lundmark	(Finland) A. Vatanen	(Russia) F. Kabirov

- ^1 - Miki Biasion set the fastest time for the stage, but was stripped of the win after incurring a ten-hour penalty for a gearbox change in parc ferme conditions.

== Stage Results ==
=== Motorcycles ===
	Stage result					General classification				
Stage	Pos	Competitor	Make	Time	Gap	Pos	Competitor	Make	Time	Gap
1	1	(France) Cyril Despres	KTM	1:39		Stage not counted towards overall classification				
1	2	(Spain) Nani Roma	KTM	1:40	0:01	Stage not counted towards overall classification				
1	3	(France) Cyril Raynal	KTM	1:41	0:02	Stage not counted towards overall classification				
2	1	(France) Richard Sainct	KTM	41:40		1	(France) Richard Sainct	KTM	41:40	
2	2	(South Africa) Alfie Cox	KTM	41:55	0:15	2	(South Africa) Alfie Cox	KTM	41:55	0:15
2	3	(France) Cyril Despres	KTM	42:17	0:37	3	(France) Cyril Despres	KTM	42:17	0:37
3	1	(France) Cyril Despres	KTM	6:30		1	(France) Richard Sainct	KTM	48:29	
3	2	(Netherlands) Eric Verhoef	KTM	6:32	0:02	2	(South Africa) Alfie Cox	KTM	48:39	0:10
3	3	(Spain) Marc Coma	KTM	6:40	0:10	3	(France) Cyril Despres	KTM	48:47	0:18
4	1	(Spain) Nani Roma	KTM	19:42		1	(France) Richard Sainct	KTM	1:08:29	
4	2	(Brazil) Jean de Azevedo	KTM	19:58	0:16	2	(France) Cyril Despres	KTM	1:08:51	0:22
4	3	(France) Richard Sainct	KTM	20:00	0:18	3	(Spain) Nani Roma	KTM	1:09:28	0:59
5	1	(France) Richard Sainct	KTM	2:41:42		1	(France) Richard Sainct	KTM	3:50:11	
5	2	(Italy) Fabrizio Meoni	KTM	2:41:59	0:17	2	(Italy) Fabrizio Meoni	KTM	3:52:36	2:25
5	3	(Spain) Nani Roma	KTM	2:44:59	3:17	3	(Spain) Nani Roma	KTM	3:54:27	4:16
6	1	(South Africa) Alfie Cox	KTM	2:27:54		1	(France) Richard Sainct	KTM	6:23:11	
6	2	(Spain) Nani Roma	KTM	2:29:01	1:07	2	(Italy) Fabrizio Meoni	KTM	6:23:28	0:17
6	3	(France) Cyril Despres	KTM	2:29:53	1:59	3	(Spain) Nani Roma	KTM	6:23:28	0:17
7	1	(France) Richard Sainct	KTM	5:49:52		1	(France) Richard Sainct	KTM	12:13:03	
7	2	(Italy) Fabrizio Meoni	KTM	5:51:22	1:30	2	(Italy) Fabrizio Meoni	KTM	12:14:50	1:47
7	3	(Spain) Nani Roma	KTM	5:55:22	5:30	3	(Spain) Nani Roma	KTM	12:18:50	5:47
8	1	(Italy) Giovanni Sala	KTM	4:34:45		1	(Italy) Fabrizio Meoni	KTM	16:56:34	
8	2	(France) Jean Brucy	KTM	4:36:51	2:06	2	(France) Richard Sainct	KTM	16:57:08	0:34
8	3	(France) Cyril Despres	KTM	4:38:24	3:39	3	(Spain) Nani Roma	KTM	16:58:41	2:07
9	1	(France) Richard Sainct	KTM	6:01:23		1	(France) Richard Sainct	KTM	22:58:31	
9	2	(Italy) Fabrizio Meoni	KTM	6:03:27	1:44	2	(Italy) Fabrizio Meoni	KTM	22:59:41	1:10
9	3	(Brazil) Jean de Azevedo	KTM	6:06:27	5:04	3	(France) Cyril Despres	KTM	23:10:21	11:50
10	1	(Sweden) Per-Gunnar Lundmark	KTM	4:22:22		1	(France) Richard Sainct	KTM	27:25:27	
10	2	(France) Cyril Despres	KTM	4:26:09	3:47	2	(France) Cyril Despres	KTM	27:36:30	11:03
10	3	(France) Richard Sainct	KTM	4:26:56	4:34	3	(Italy) Fabrizio Meoni	KTM	28:03:01	37:34
11	1	(Italy) Fabrizio Meoni	KTM	3:45:52		1	(France) Richard Sainct	KTM	31:20:52	
11	2	(France) Richard Sainct	KTM	3:55:25	9:33	2	(France) Cyril Despres	KTM	31:33:39	12:47
11	3	(France) Cyril Despres	KTM	3:57:09	11:17	3	(Italy) Fabrizio Meoni	KTM	31:48:53	28:01
12	1	(Italy) Giovanni Sala	KTM	3:41:14		1	(France) Richard Sainct	KTM	35:09:47	
12	2	(Norway) Pål Anders Ullevålseter	KTM	3:41:22	0:08	2	(France) Cyril Despres	KTM	35:20:35	10:48
12	3	(Slovenia) Miran Stanovnik	KTM	3:42:22	1:08	3	(Italy) Fabrizio Meoni	KTM	35:39:47	30:00
13	1	(Italy) Fabrizio Meoni	KTM	4:47:18		1	(France) Richard Sainct	KTM	40:20:21	
13	2	(France) Richard Sainct	KTM	5:10:34	13:16	2	(France) Cyril Despres	KTM	40:31:23	11:02
13	3	(France) Cyril Despres	KTM	5:10:48	13:30	3	(Italy) Fabrizio Meoni	KTM	40:37:05	16:44
14	1	(France) Richard Sainct	KTM	3:00:14		1	(France) Richard Sainct	KTM	43:20:35	
14	2	(France) Cyril Despres	KTM	3:00:32	0:18	2	(France) Cyril Despres	KTM	43:31:55	11:20
14	3	(Spain) Marc Coma	KTM	3:03:22	3:08	3	(Italy) Fabrizio Meoni	KTM	43:59:56	39:21
15	1	(Italy) Fabrizio Meoni	KTM	4:42:25		1	(France) Richard Sainct	KTM	48:08:23	
15	2	(Sweden) Per-Gunnar Lundmark	KTM	4:44:12	1:47	2	(France) Cyril Despres	KTM	48:18:52	10:29
15	3	(Spain) Marc Coma	KTM	4:46:21	3:56	3	(Italy) Fabrizio Meoni	KTM	48:42:21	33:58
16	1	(France) Cyril Despres	KTM	4:52:19		1	(France) Richard Sainct	KTM	53:03:17	
16	2	(France) Richard Sainct	KTM	4:54:54	2:35	2	(France) Cyril Despres	KTM	53:11:11	7:54
16	3	(Spain) Marc Coma	KTM	4:58:39	6:20	3	(Italy) Fabrizio Meoni	KTM	53:41:31	38:14
17	1	(Sweden) Per-Gunnar Lundmark	KTM	19:34		1	(France) Richard Sainct	KTM	53:24:32	
17	2	(Norway) Pål Anders Ullevålseter	KTM	19:42	0:08	2	(France) Cyril Despres	KTM	53:31:50	7:18
17	3	(Italy) Fabrizio Meoni	KTM	20:31	0:57	3	(Italy) Fabrizio Meoni	KTM	54:02:02	37:30

=== Cars ===
	Stage result					General classification				
Stage	Pos	Competitor	Make	Time	Gap	Pos	Competitor	Make	Time	Gap
1	1	(Japan) Kenjiro Shinozuka (France) Thierry Delli-Zotti	Nissan	1:43		Stage not counted towards overall classification				
1	2	(France) Stéphane Peterhansel (France) Jean-Paul Cottret	Mitsubishi	1:44	0:01	Stage not counted towards overall classification				
1	3	(Japan) Hiroshi Masuoka (Germany) Andreas Schulz	Mitsubishi	1:44	0:01	Stage not counted towards overall classification				
2	1	(France) Stéphane Peterhansel (France) Jean-Paul Cottret	Mitsubishi	38:48		1	(France) Stéphane Peterhansel (France) Jean-Paul Cottret	Mitsubishi	38:48	
2	2	(South Africa) Giniel de Villiers (France) Pascal Maimon	Nissan	39:05	0:17	2	(South Africa) Giniel de Villiers (France) Pascal Maimon	Nissan	39:05	0:17
2	3	(Japan) Hiroshi Masuoka (Germany) Andreas Schulz	Mitsubishi	39:22	0:34	3	(Japan) Hiroshi Masuoka (Germany) Andreas Schulz	Mitsubishi	39:22	0:34
3	1	(Japan) Hiroshi Masuoka (Germany) Andreas Schulz	Mitsubishi	6:42		1	(France) Stéphane Peterhansel (France) Jean-Paul Cottret	Mitsubishi	45:35	
3	2	(France) Stéphane Peterhansel (France) Jean-Paul Cottret	Mitsubishi	6:47	0:05	2	(Japan) Hiroshi Masuoka (Germany) Andreas Schulz	Mitsubishi	46:04	0:29
3	3	(Belgium) Stéphane Henrard (United Kingdom) Bobby Willis	Volkswagen	6:55	0:13	3	(South Africa) Giniel de Villiers (France) Pascal Maimon	Nissan	46:08	0:33
4	1	(France) Stéphane Peterhansel (France) Jean-Paul Cottret	Mitsubishi	18:26		1	(France) Stéphane Peterhansel (France) Jean-Paul Cottret	Mitsubishi	1:04:01	
4	2	(Belgium) Grégoire de Mévius (France) Alain Guehennec	BMW	18:48	0:22	2	(South Africa) Giniel de Villiers (France) Pascal Maimon	Nissan	1:05:24	1:23
4	3	(Finland) Ari Vatanen (Sweden) Tina Thörner	Nissan	18:54	0:28	3	(Japan) Hiroshi Masuoka (Germany) Andreas Schulz	Mitsubishi	1:05:26	1:25
5	1	(Japan) Hiroshi Masuoka (Germany) Andreas Schulz	Mitsubishi	2:31:59		1	(Japan) Hiroshi Masuoka (Germany) Andreas Schulz	Mitsubishi	3:37:25	
5	2	(France) Stéphane Peterhansel (France) Jean-Paul Cottret	Mitsubishi	2:34:19	2:20	2	(France) Stéphane Peterhansel (France) Jean-Paul Cottret	Mitsubishi	3:38:20	0:55
5	3	(Japan) Kenjiro Shinozuka (France) Thierry Delli-Zotti	Nissan	2:40:13	8:14	3	(Japan) Kenjiro Shinozuka (France) Thierry Delli-Zotti	Nissan	3:48:14	10:49
6	1	(France) Stéphane Peterhansel (France) Jean-Paul Cottret	Mitsubishi	2:02:56		1	(France) Stéphane Peterhansel (France) Jean-Paul Cottret	Mitsubishi	5:41:16	
6	2	(Japan) Hiroshi Masuoka (Germany) Andreas Schulz	Mitsubishi	2:04:40	1:44	2	(Japan) Hiroshi Masuoka (Germany) Andreas Schulz	Mitsubishi	5:42:05	0:49
6	3	(Belgium) Grégoire de Mévius (France) Alain Guehennec	BMW	2:07:26	4:30	3	(Belgium) Grégoire de Mévius (France) Alain Guehennec	BMW	5:56:48	15:32
7	1	(France) Stéphane Peterhansel (France) Jean-Paul Cottret	Mitsubishi	5:07:41		1	(France) Stéphane Peterhansel (France) Jean-Paul Cottret	Mitsubishi	10:48:57	
7	2	(Japan) Hiroshi Masuoka (Germany) Andreas Schulz	Mitsubishi	5:19:13	11:32	2	(Japan) Hiroshi Masuoka (Germany) Andreas Schulz	Mitsubishi	11:01:18	12:21
7	3	(Finland) Ari Vatanen (Sweden) Tina Thörner	Nissan	5:34:45	27:04	3	(Japan) Kenjiro Shinozuka (France) Thierry Delli-Zotti	Nissan	11:40:17	51:20
8	1	(Japan) Hiroshi Masuoka (Germany) Andreas Schulz	Mitsubishi	3:57:42		1	(France) Stéphane Peterhansel (France) Jean-Paul Cottret	Mitsubishi	14:52:21	
8	2	(France) Stéphane Peterhansel (France) Jean-Paul Cottret	Mitsubishi	4:03:24	5:42	2	(Japan) Hiroshi Masuoka (Germany) Andreas Schulz	Mitsubishi	14:59:00	6:39
8	3	(France) Jean-Pierre Fontenay (France) Gilles Picard	Mitsubishi	4:13:09	15:27	3	(Belgium) Grégoire de Mévius (France) Alain Guehennec	BMW	15:59:33	1:07:12
9	1	(Finland) Ari Vatanen (Sweden) Tina Thörner	Nissan	5:38:37		1	(France) Stéphane Peterhansel (France) Jean-Paul Cottret	Mitsubishi	20:31:58	
9	2	(France) Jean-Pierre Fontenay (France) Gilles Picard	Mitsubishi	5:38:44	0:07	2	(Japan) Hiroshi Masuoka (Germany) Andreas Schulz	Mitsubishi	20:48:50	16:52
9	3	(France) Stéphane Peterhansel (France) Jean-Paul Cottret	Mitsubishi	5:39:37	1:00	3	(Belgium) Grégoire de Mévius (France) Alain Guehennec	BMW	21:41:48	1:09:50
10	1	(Japan) Hiroshi Masuoka (Germany) Andreas Schulz	Mitsubishi	3:46:36		1	(France) Stéphane Peterhansel (France) Jean-Paul Cottret	Mitsubishi	24:21:20	
10	2	(France) Stéphane Peterhansel (France) Jean-Paul Cottret	Mitsubishi	3:49:22	2:46	2	(Japan) Hiroshi Masuoka (Germany) Andreas Schulz	Mitsubishi	24:35:26	14:06
10	3	(France) Jean-Pierre Fontenay (France) Gilles Picard	Mitsubishi	3:56:48	10:12	3	(Belgium) Grégoire de Mévius (France) Alain Guehennec	BMW	25:50:27	1:29:07
11	1	(France) Stéphane Peterhansel (France) Jean-Paul Cottret	Mitsubishi	3:32:53		1	(France) Stéphane Peterhansel (France) Jean-Paul Cottret	Mitsubishi	27:54:13	
11	2	(France) Luc Alphand (United Kingdom) Matthew Stevenson	BMW	3:34:23	1:30	2	(Japan) Hiroshi Masuoka (Germany) Andreas Schulz	Mitsubishi	28:10:45	16:32
11	3	(Japan) Hiroshi Masuoka (Germany) Andreas Schulz	Mitsubishi	3:35:19	2:26	3	(Belgium) Grégoire de Mévius (France) Alain Guehennec	BMW	29:26:00	1:31:47
12	1	(France) Stéphane Peterhansel (France) Jean-Paul Cottret	Mitsubishi	3:04:17		1	(France) Stéphane Peterhansel (France) Jean-Paul Cottret	Mitsubishi	30:58:30	
12	2	(Japan) Hiroshi Masuoka (Germany) Andreas Schulz	Mitsubishi	3:12:03	7:46	2	(Japan) Hiroshi Masuoka (Germany) Andreas Schulz	Mitsubishi	31:22:48	24:18
12	3	(France) Jean-Pierre Fontenay (France) Gilles Picard	Mitsubishi	3:21:02	16:45	3	(France) Jean-Pierre Fontenay (France) Gilles Picard	Mitsubishi	33:24:15	2:25:45
13	1	(Finland) Ari Vatanen (Sweden) Tina Thörner	Nissan	4:42:29		1	(France) Stéphane Peterhansel (France) Jean-Paul Cottret	Mitsubishi	35:57:10	
13	2	(France) Luc Alphand (United Kingdom) Matthew Stevenson	BMW	4:43:47	1:18	2	(Japan) Hiroshi Masuoka (Germany) Andreas Schulz	Mitsubishi	36:23:00	25:50
13	3	(South Africa) Giniel de Villiers (France) Pascal Maimon	Nissan	4:50:51	8:22	3	(France) Jean-Pierre Fontenay (France) Gilles Picard	Mitsubishi	38:26:43	2:29:33
14	1	(France) Luc Alphand (United Kingdom) Matthew Stevenson	BMW	3:02:20		1	(France) Stéphane Peterhansel (France) Jean-Paul Cottret	Mitsubishi	39:03:57	
14	2	(France) Jean-Pierre Fontenay (France) Gilles Picard	Mitsubishi	3:02:42	0:22	2	(Japan) Hiroshi Masuoka (Germany) Andreas Schulz	Mitsubishi	39:31:10	27:13
14	3	(South Africa) Giniel de Villiers (France) Pascal Maimon	Nissan	3:03:26	1:06	3	(France) Jean-Pierre Fontenay (France) Gilles Picard	Mitsubishi	41:29:25	2:25:28
15	1	(Finland) Ari Vatanen (Sweden) Tina Thörner	Nissan	4:06:51		1	(France) Stéphane Peterhansel (France) Jean-Paul Cottret	Mitsubishi	43:25:41	
15	2	(Italy) Miki Biasion (Italy) Tiziano Siviero	Mitsubishi	4:13:14	6:23	2	(Japan) Hiroshi Masuoka (Germany) Andreas Schulz	Mitsubishi	43:51:31	25:50
15	3	(South Africa) Giniel de Villiers (France) Pascal Maimon	Nissan	4:19:40	12:49	3	(France) Jean-Pierre Fontenay (France) Gilles Picard	Mitsubishi	45:49:28	2:23:47
16	1	(Belgium) Stéphane Henrard (United Kingdom) Bobby Willis	Volkswagen	4:48:40		1	(Japan) Hiroshi Masuoka (Germany) Andreas Schulz	Mitsubishi	48:44:08	
16	2	(France) Jean-Pierre Fontenay (France) Gilles Picard	Mitsubishi	4:48:50	0:10	2	(France) Jean-Pierre Fontenay (France) Gilles Picard	Mitsubishi	50:38:18	1:54:10
16	3	(South Africa) Giniel de Villiers (France) Pascal Maimon	Nissan	4:49:10	0:30	3	(France) Stéphane Peterhansel (France) Jean-Paul Cottret	Mitsubishi	51:04:33	2:20:25
17	1	(Finland) Ari Vatanen (Sweden) Tina Thörner	Nissan	16:32		1	(Japan) Hiroshi Masuoka (Germany) Andreas Schulz	Mitsubishi	49:08:52	
17	2	(France) Luc Alphand (United Kingdom) Matthew Stevenson	BMW	17:48	1:16	2	(France) Jean-Pierre Fontenay (France) Gilles Picard	Mitsubishi	51:01:04	1:52:12
17	3	(Germany) Jutta Kleinschmidt (Italy) Fabrizia Pons	Volkswagen	17:51	1:19	3	(France) Stéphane Peterhansel (France) Jean-Paul Cottret	Mitsubishi	51:25:20	2:16:28

=== Trucks ===
	Stage result					General classification				
Stage	Pos	Competitor	Make	Time	Gap	Pos	Competitor	Make	Time	Gap
1	1	(Brazil) André de Azevedo (Czech Republic) Tomáš Tomeček (Czech Republic) Jaromír Martinec	Tatra	2:33		Stage not counted towards overall classification				
1	2	(Netherlands) Jan de Rooy (Belgium) Yvo Geusens (Belgium) Hugo Duisters	DAF	2:34	0:01	Stage not counted towards overall classification				
1	3	(Italy) Corrado Pattono (Italy) Enrico Santoro	Mercedes-Benz	2:36	0:03	Stage not counted towards overall classification				
2	1	(Netherlands) Jan de Rooy (Belgium) Yvo Geusens (Belgium) Hugo Duisters	DAF	51:28		1	(Netherlands) Jan de Rooy (Belgium) Yvo Geusens (Belgium) Hugo Duisters	DAF	51:28	
2	2	(Netherlands) Gérard de Rooy (Belgium) Tom Colsoul (Netherlands) Arno Slaats	DAF	52:06	0:38	2	(Netherlands) Gérard de Rooy (Belgium) Tom Colsoul (Netherlands) Arno Slaats	DAF	52:06	0:38
2	3	(Germany) Klaus Bauerle (Poland) Jarosław Kazberuk	Mercedes-Benz	52:13	0:45	3	(Germany) Klaus Bauerle (Poland) Jarosław Kazberuk	Mercedes-Benz	52:13	0:45
3	1	(Netherlands) Gérard de Rooy (Belgium) Tom Colsoul (Netherlands) Arno Slaats	DAF	8:32		1	(Netherlands) Jan de Rooy (Belgium) Yvo Geusens (Belgium) Hugo Duisters	DAF	1:00:04	
3	2	(Netherlands) Jan de Rooy (Belgium) Yvo Geusens (Belgium) Hugo Duisters	DAF	8:36	0:04	2	(Netherlands) Gérard de Rooy (Belgium) Tom Colsoul (Netherlands) Arno Slaats	DAF	1:00:38	0:34
3	3	(Russia) Vladimir Chagin (Russia) Semen Yakubov (Russia) Sergey Savostin	Kamaz	8:49	0:17	3	(Italy) Corrado Pattono (Italy) Enrico Santoro	Mercedes-Benz	1:02:15	2:11
4	1	(Netherlands) Jan de Rooy (Belgium) Yvo Geusens (Belgium) Hugo Duisters	DAF	23:26		1	(Netherlands) Jan de Rooy (Belgium) Yvo Geusens (Belgium) Hugo Duisters	DAF	1:23:30	
4	2	(Russia) Vladimir Chagin (Russia) Semen Yakubov (Russia) Sergey Savostin	Kamaz	23:48	0:22	2	(Netherlands) Gérard de Rooy (Belgium) Tom Colsoul (Netherlands) Arno Slaats	DAF	1:25:35	2:05
4	3	(Russia) Firdaus Kabirov (Russia) Aydar Belyaev (Russia) Ilgizar Mardeev	Kamaz	24:42	1:16	3	(Russia) Vladimir Chagin (Russia) Semen Yakubov (Russia) Sergey Savostin	Kamaz	1:26:17	2:47
5	1	(Czech Republic) Karel Loprais (Czech Republic) Josef Kalina (Czech Republic) Petr Hamerla	Tatra	3:27:40		1	(Russia) Vladimir Chagin (Russia) Semen Yakubov (Russia) Sergey Savostin	Kamaz	4:54:50	
5	2	(Russia) Vladimir Chagin (Russia) Semen Yakubov (Russia) Sergey Savostin	Kamaz	3:28:33	0:53	2	(Czech Republic) Karel Loprais (Czech Republic) Josef Kalina (Czech Republic) Petr Hamerla	Tatra	4:56:11	1:21
5	3	(Russia) Firdaus Kabirov (Russia) Aydar Belyaev (Russia) Ilgizar Mardeev	Kamaz	3:34:00	6:20	3	(Netherlands) Jan de Rooy (Belgium) Yvo Geusens (Belgium) Hugo Duisters	DAF	5:00:43	5:53
6	1	(Netherlands) Gérard de Rooy (Belgium) Tom Colsoul (Netherlands) Arno Slaats	DAF	2:34:40		1	(Netherlands) Jan de Rooy (Belgium) Yvo Geusens (Belgium) Hugo Duisters	DAF	7:37:03	
6	2	(Netherlands) Jan de Rooy (Belgium) Yvo Geusens (Belgium) Hugo Duisters	DAF	2:36:20	1:40	2	(Netherlands) Gérard de Rooy (Belgium) Tom Colsoul (Netherlands) Arno Slaats	DAF	7:43:38	6:35
6	3	(Brazil) André de Azevedo (Czech Republic) Tomáš Tomeček (Czech Republic) Jaromír Martinec	Tatra	2:43:30	8:50	3	(Russia) Vladimir Chagin (Russia) Semen Yakubov (Russia) Sergey Savostin	Kamaz	7:44:11	7:08
7	1	(Netherlands) Gérard de Rooy (Belgium) Tom Colsoul (Netherlands) Arno Slaats	DAF	6:15:46		1	(Netherlands) Gérard de Rooy (Belgium) Tom Colsoul (Netherlands) Arno Slaats	DAF	13:59:24	
7	2	(Russia) Vladimir Chagin (Russia) Semen Yakubov (Russia) Sergey Savostin	Kamaz	6:17:27	1:41	2	(Russia) Vladimir Chagin (Russia) Semen Yakubov (Russia) Sergey Savostin	Kamaz	14:01:38	2:14
7	3	(Brazil) André de Azevedo (Czech Republic) Tomáš Tomeček (Czech Republic) Jaromír Martinec	Tatra	6:40:15	24:49	3	(Brazil) André de Azevedo (Czech Republic) Tomáš Tomeček (Czech Republic) Jaromír Martinec	Tatra	14:29:31	30:07
8	1	(Russia) Vladimir Chagin (Russia) Semen Yakubov (Russia) Sergey Savostin	Kamaz	4:48:06		1	(Russia) Vladimir Chagin (Russia) Semen Yakubov (Russia) Sergey Savostin	Kamaz	18:55:14^{1}	
8	2	(Netherlands) Gérard de Rooy (Belgium) Tom Colsoul (Netherlands) Arno Slaats	DAF	4:56:22	8:16	2	(Netherlands) Gérard de Rooy (Belgium) Tom Colsoul (Netherlands) Arno Slaats	DAF	18:55:46	0:32
8	3	(Netherlands) Jan de Rooy (Belgium) Yvo Geusens (Belgium) Hugo Duisters	DAF	5:01:43	13:37	3	(Brazil) André de Azevedo (Czech Republic) Tomáš Tomeček (Czech Republic) Jaromír Martinec	Tatra	19:42:48	47:34
9	1	(Netherlands) Gérard de Rooy (Belgium) Tom Colsoul (Netherlands) Arno Slaats	DAF	6:56:49		1	(Netherlands) Gérard de Rooy (Belgium) Tom Colsoul (Netherlands) Arno Slaats	DAF	25:52:35	
9	2	(Russia) Firdaus Kabirov (Russia) Aydar Belyaev (Russia) Ilgizar Mardeev	Kamaz	7:02:49	6:00	2	(Russia) Vladimir Chagin (Russia) Semen Yakubov (Russia) Sergey Savostin	Kamaz	26:14:07	21:32
9	3	(Brazil) André de Azevedo (Czech Republic) Tomáš Tomeček (Czech Republic) Jaromír Martinec	Tatra	7:10:58	14:09	3	(Brazil) André de Azevedo (Czech Republic) Tomáš Tomeček (Czech Republic) Jaromír Martinec	Tatra	26:53:46	1:01:11
10	1	(Brazil) André de Azevedo (Czech Republic) Tomáš Tomeček (Czech Republic) Jaromír Martinec	Tatra	4:54:40		1	(Netherlands) Gérard de Rooy (Belgium) Tom Colsoul (Netherlands) Arno Slaats	DAF	31:09:25	
10	2	(Russia) Vladimir Chagin (Russia) Semen Yakubov (Russia) Sergey Savostin	Kamaz	4:57:10	2:30	2	(Russia) Vladimir Chagin (Russia) Semen Yakubov (Russia) Sergey Savostin	Kamaz	31:11:17	1:52
10	3	(Russia) Firdaus Kabirov (Russia) Aydar Belyaev (Russia) Ilgizar Mardeev	Kamaz	4:57:50	3:10	3	(Brazil) André de Azevedo (Czech Republic) Tomáš Tomeček (Czech Republic) Jaromír Martinec	Tatra	31:48:26	39:01
11	1	(Netherlands) Gérard de Rooy (Belgium) Tom Colsoul (Netherlands) Arno Slaats	DAF	4:17:46		1	(Netherlands) Gérard de Rooy (Belgium) Tom Colsoul (Netherlands) Arno Slaats	DAF	35:27:11	
11	2	(Russia) Vladimir Chagin (Russia) Semen Yakubov (Russia) Sergey Savostin	Kamaz	4:20:46	3:00	2	(Russia) Vladimir Chagin (Russia) Semen Yakubov (Russia) Sergey Savostin	Kamaz	35:32:03	4:52
11	3	(Netherlands) Jan de Rooy (Belgium) Yvo Geusens (Belgium) Hugo Duisters	DAF	4:24:27	6:41	3	(Brazil) André de Azevedo (Czech Republic) Tomáš Tomeček (Czech Republic) Jaromír Martinec	Tatra	36:17:23	50:12
12	1	(Russia) Vladimir Chagin (Russia) Semen Yakubov (Russia) Sergey Savostin	Kamaz	4:02:17		1	(Russia) Vladimir Chagin (Russia) Semen Yakubov (Russia) Sergey Savostin	Kamaz	39:34:20	
12	2	(Netherlands) Jan de Rooy (Belgium) Yvo Geusens (Belgium) Hugo Duisters	DAF	4:12:36	10:19	2	(Brazil) André de Azevedo (Czech Republic) Tomáš Tomeček (Czech Republic) Jaromír Martinec	Tatra	40:41:12	1:06:52
12	3	(Russia) Firdaus Kabirov (Russia) Aydar Belyaev (Russia) Ilgizar Mardeev	Kamaz	4:16:36	14:19	3	(Netherlands) Jan de Rooy (Belgium) Yvo Geusens (Belgium) Hugo Duisters	DAF	42:05:56	2:31:36
13	1	(Russia) Firdaus Kabirov (Russia) Aydar Belyaev (Russia) Ilgizar Mardeev	Kamaz	6:12:36		1	(Russia) Vladimir Chagin (Russia) Semen Yakubov (Russia) Sergey Savostin	Kamaz	45:54:11	
13	2	(Netherlands) Jan de Rooy (Belgium) Yvo Geusens (Belgium) Hugo Duisters	DAF	6:15:05	2:29	2	(Brazil) André de Azevedo (Czech Republic) Tomáš Tomeček (Czech Republic) Jaromír Martinec	Tatra	47:03:04	1:08:53
13	3	(Russia) Vladimir Chagin (Russia) Semen Yakubov (Russia) Sergey Savostin	Kamaz	6:19:51	7:15	3	(Netherlands) Jan de Rooy (Belgium) Yvo Geusens (Belgium) Hugo Duisters	DAF	48:21:01	2:26:50
14	1	(Russia) Firdaus Kabirov (Russia) Aydar Belyaev (Russia) Ilgizar Mardeev	Kamaz	3:37:38		1	(Russia) Vladimir Chagin (Russia) Semen Yakubov (Russia) Sergey Savostin	Kamaz	50:01:02	
14	2	(Russia) Vladimir Chagin (Russia) Semen Yakubov (Russia) Sergey Savostin	Kamaz	4:06:51	29:13	2	(Brazil) André de Azevedo (Czech Republic) Tomáš Tomeček (Czech Republic) Jaromír Martinec	Tatra	51:12:03	1:11:01
14	3	(Brazil) André de Azevedo (Czech Republic) Tomáš Tomeček (Czech Republic) Jaromír Martinec	Tatra	4:08:59	31:21	3	(Russia) Firdaus Kabirov (Russia) Aydar Belyaev (Russia) Ilgizar Mardeev	Kamaz	52:23:43	2:22:41
15	1	(Russia) Firdaus Kabirov (Russia) Aydar Belyaev (Russia) Ilgizar Mardeev	Kamaz	5:06:53		1	(Russia) Vladimir Chagin (Russia) Semen Yakubov (Russia) Sergey Savostin	Kamaz	55:21:52	
15	2	(Russia) Vladimir Chagin (Russia) Semen Yakubov (Russia) Sergey Savostin	Kamaz	5:20:50	13:57	2	(Brazil) André de Azevedo (Czech Republic) Tomáš Tomeček (Czech Republic) Jaromír Martinec	Tatra	56:34:19	1:12:27
15	3	(Brazil) André de Azevedo (Czech Republic) Tomáš Tomeček (Czech Republic) Jaromír Martinec	Tatra	5:22:16	15:23	3	(Russia) Firdaus Kabirov (Russia) Aydar Belyaev (Russia) Ilgizar Mardeev	Kamaz	57:30:36	2:08:44
16	1	(Russia) Firdaus Kabirov (Russia) Aydar Belyaev (Russia) Ilgizar Mardeev	Kamaz	5:07:56		1	(Russia) Vladimir Chagin (Russia) Semen Yakubov (Russia) Sergey Savostin	Kamaz	61:12:59	
16	2	(Brazil) André de Azevedo (Czech Republic) Tomáš Tomeček (Czech Republic) Jaromír Martinec	Tatra	5:40:30	32:34	2	(Brazil) André de Azevedo (Czech Republic) Tomáš Tomeček (Czech Republic) Jaromír Martinec	Tatra	62:14:49	1:01:50
16	3	(Netherlands) Jan de Rooy (Belgium) Yvo Geusens (Belgium) Hugo Duisters	DAF	5:47:50	39:54	3	(Russia) Firdaus Kabirov (Russia) Aydar Belyaev (Russia) Ilgizar Mardeev	Kamaz	62:38:32	1:25:33
17	1	(Russia) Firdaus Kabirov (Russia) Aydar Belyaev (Russia) Ilgizar Mardeev	Kamaz	23:12		1	(Russia) Vladimir Chagin (Russia) Semen Yakubov (Russia) Sergey Savostin	Kamaz	61:12:59	
17	2	(Japan) Yoshimasa Sugawara (Japan) Seiichi Suzuki (Japan) Teruhito Sugawara	Hino	23:29	0:17	2	(Brazil) André de Azevedo (Czech Republic) Tomáš Tomeček (Czech Republic) Jaromír Martinec	Tatra	62:38:41	1:02:01
17	3	(Russia) Vladimir Chagin (Russia) Semen Yakubov (Russia) Sergey Savostin	Kamaz	23:41	0:29	3	(Russia) Firdaus Kabirov (Russia) Aydar Belyaev (Russia) Ilgizar Mardeev	Kamaz	63:01:44	1:25:04

- ^1 - Vladimir Chagin's time includes a penalty of 5:30.

== Final standings ==
=== Motorcycles ===
Pos	No.	Rider	Bike	Entrant	Time
1	3	(France) Richard Sainct	KTM	Gauloises KTM	53:24:32
2	7	(France) Cyril Despres	KTM	Gauloises KTM	+7:18
3	1	(Italy) Fabrizio Meoni	KTM	Gauloises KTM	+37:30
4	9	(France) Jean Brucy	KTM	Gauloises KTM	+1:36:29
5	25	(Brazil) Jean de Azevedo	KTM	Petrobras Lubrax	+1:46:05
6	16	(Sweden) Per-Gunnar Lundmark	KTM	Farmerlips	+1:55:57
7	12	(Norway) Pål Anders Ullevålseter	KTM	Farmerlips	+2:40:42
8	5	(Chile) Carlo de Gavardo	KTM	KTM Factory Team	+3:29:01
9	19	(Poland) Marek Dabrowski	KTM	Orlen Team	+3:51:00
10	22	(France) François Flick	KTM	Bijouterie Carador	+4:03:06

=== Cars ===
Pos	No.	Driver	Co-Driver	Car	Entrant	Time
1	200	(Japan) Hiroshi Masuoka	(Germany) Andreas Schulz	Mitsubishi	Team ENEOS Mitsubishi Ralliart	49:08:52
2	202	(France) Jean-Pierre Fontenay	(France) Gilles Picard	Mitsubishi	Team ENEOS Mitsubishi Ralliart	+1:52:12
3	206	(France) Stéphane Peterhansel	(France) Jean-Paul Cottret	Mitsubishi	Team ATS Mitsubishi Ralliart	+2:16:28
4	211	(Portugal) Carlos Sousa	(Andorra) Henri Magne	Mitsubishi	Mitsubishi Ralliart	+2:27:47
5	217	(South Africa) Giniel de Villiers	(France) Pascal Maimon	Nissan	Nissan Rally Raid Team	+2:45:55
6	215	(Belgium) Stéphane Henrard	(United Kingdom) Bobby Willis	Volkswagen	Volkswagen Motorsport	+3:42:15
7	204	(Finland) Ari Vatanen	(Sweden) Tina Thörner	Nissan	Nissan Rally Raid Team	+4:25:59
8	203	(Germany) Jutta Kleinschmidt	(Italy) Fabrizia Pons	Volkswagen	Volkswagen Motorsport	+8:16:56
9	221	(France) Luc Alphand	(United Kingdom) Matthew Stevenson	BMW	Team X-Raid	+8:56:06
10	224	(Spain) José Luis Monterde	(Spain) Rafael Tornabell	Mitsubishi	Ralliart	+9:08:19

=== Trucks ===
Pos	No.	Driver	Co-Drivers	Truck	Time
1	407	(Russia) Vladimir Chagin	(Russia) Semen Yakubov (Russia) Sergey Savostin	Kamaz	61:36:40
2	410	(Brazil) André de Azevedo	(Czech Republic) Tomáš Tomeček (Czech Republic) Jaromír Martinec	Tatra 815	+1:02:01
3	412	(Russia) Firdaus Kabirov	(Russia) Aydar Belyaev (Russia) Ilgizar Mardeev	Kamaz	+1:25:04
4	409	(Netherlands) Jan de Rooy	(Belgium) Yvo Guesens (Belgium) Hugo Duisters	DAF	+2:38:49
5	400	(Japan) Yoshimasa Sugawara	(Japan) Seiichi Suzuki (Japan) Teruhito Sugawara	Hino	+10:21:28
6	443	(France) Philippe Jacquot	(France) Jacky Maillot (France) Eric Simonin	MAN	+17:27:42
7	419	(France) Jean-Paul Bosonnet	(France) Serge Lacourt (France) Pascal Bonnaire	Mercedes-Benz	+17:53:05
8	402	(Italy) Corrado Pattono	(Italy) Enrico Santoro	Mercedes-Benz	+18:30:29
9	404	(Italy) Maurizio Panseri	(Italy) Giacomo Paccani (Italy) Mario Cambiaghi	Mercedes-Benz	+19:31:28
10	440	(Germany) Franz Echter	(Austria) Johannes Lehrer (Germany) Detlef Ruf	MAN	+19:52:38
