= 2000 Paris–Dakar–Cairo Rally =

Off-road motorsport event in Africa

2000 Dakar Rally
← Previous event	Next event →
- Host country: Senegal; Mali; Morocco; Burkina Faso; Niger; Libya; Egypt

Results
- Cars winner: (France) Jean-Louis Schlesser (Andorra) Henri Magne; Schlesser-Renault
- Bikes winner: (France) Richard Sainct; BMW
- Trucks winner: (Russia) Vladimir Chagin (Russia) Semen Yakubov (Russia) Sergey Savostin; Kamaz

The 2000 Dakar Rally, also known as the 2000 Dakar–Cairo Rally, was the 22nd running of the Dakar Rally event. The event began on 6 January 2000 in Senegal and ended on 23 January in Cairo. It had been re-routed to avoid Mauritania following an armed robbery of competitors in the 1999 rally. Four stages of the rally scheduled to be held in Niger were cancelled following a reported terrorist threat. Competitors were airlifted from Niamey airport to Libya where the rally was restarted five days later at Sabha. The rally was won by French driver Jean-Louis Schlesser and his co-driver Henri Magne in a Schlesser-Renault buggy., with the motorcycle title going to BMW's Richard Sainct and the truck title to Kamaz's Vladimir Chagin.

== Stages ==
Stage	Date	From	To	Total (km)	Stage winners		
Stage	Date	From	To	Total (km)	Bikes	Cars	Trucks
1	6 January	(Senegal) Dakar	(Senegal) Tambacounda	594	(France) R. Sainct	(Portugal) C. Sousa	(Brazil) A. de Azevedo
2	7 January	(Senegal) Tambacounda	(Mali) Kayes	359	(Spain) J. Arcarons	(France) S. Peterhansel	(Russia) V. Chagin
3	8 January	(Mali) Kayes	(Mali) Bamako	711	(Spain) N. Roma	(Japan) K. Shinozuka	(Russia) V. Chagin
4	9 January	(Mali) Bamako	(Burkina Faso) Bobo-Dioulasso	608	(Spain) N. Roma	(Germany) J. Kleinschmidt	(Russia) V. Chagin
5	10 January	(Burkina Faso) Bobo-Dioulasso	(Burkina Faso) Ouagadougou	762	(Austria) H. Kinigadner	(France) J-L. Schlesser	(Brazil) A. de Azevedo
6	11 January	(Burkina Faso) Ouagadougou	(Niger) Niamey	733	(France) R. Sainct	(Portugal) C. Sousa	(Russia) F. Kabirov
	12 January	(Niger) Niamey	(Libya) Sabha	Rally suspended			
	13 January	(Niger) Niamey	(Libya) Sabha	Rally suspended			
	14 January	(Niger) Niamey	(Libya) Sabha	Rally suspended			
	15 January	(Niger) Niamey	(Libya) Sabha	Rally suspended			
	16 January	(Niger) Niamey	(Libya) Sabha	Rally suspended			
7	17 January	(Libya) Sabha	(Libya) Waw El-Kebir	469	(Austria) H. Kinigadner	(France) J-P. Fontenay	(Russia) F. Kabirov
8	18 January	(Libya) Waw El-Kebir	(Libya) Waha	661	(South Africa) A. Cox	(France) J-L. Schlesser	(Russia) F. Kabirov
9	19 January	(Libya) Waha	(Libya) Khofra	647	(United States) J. Lewis	(France) S. Peterhansel	(Czech Republic) K. Loprais
10	20 January	(Libya) Khofra	(Egypt) Dakhla	852	(Spain) O. Gallardo (United States) J. Lewis	(Spain) J. M. Servia	(Russia) V. Chagin
11	21 January	(Egypt) Dakhla		606	(Spain) I. Esteve	(France) J-P. Fontenay	(Czech Republic) K. Loprais
12	22 January	(Egypt) Dakhla	(Egypt) Wadi Elrayan	722	(Spain) N. Roma	(Japan) H. Masuoka	(Czech Republic) K. Loprais
13	23 January	(Egypt) Wadi Elrayan	(Egypt) Cairo	139	(Spain) N. Roma	(Spain) J. M. Servia	(Russia) F. Kabirov

Motorcycles principal entry

KTM

2 Heinz Kinigadner

3 Kari Tiainen

4 Fabrizio Meoni

6 Alfie Cox

7 Joan Roma

9 Giovanni Sala

12 Jordi Arcarons

16 Carlo de Gavardo

18 Isidre Esteve Pujol

BMW

1 Richard Sainct

5 Oscar Gallardo

8 Jimmy Lewis

10 John Deacon

19 Jean Brucy

Honda

23 Le Blanc

77 Ikemachi Yoshio

Cars principal entry

Schlesser-Renault

250 Jean Louis Schelesser

253 Jose Maria Servia

Mitsubishi

251 Jean Pierre Fontenay

254 Kenjiro Shinozuka

256 Jutta Kleinschmidt

260 Carlos Souza

271 Hiroshi Masuoka

Ford

252 Bruno Saby

Nissan

255 Thierry Delavergne

259 Philippe Wambergue

269 Gregoire de Mevius

Trucks principal entry

Kamaz

409 Vladimir Tchaguine

416 Firdaus Kabirov

Tatra

407 Karel Loprais

408 André de Azevedo

414 Bedrich Slenovsky

Hino

400 Yoshimasa Sugawara

MAN

415 Peter Reif

== Stage Results ==
=== Motorcycles ===
	Stage result					General classification				
Stage	Pos	Competitor	Make	Time	Gap	Pos	Competitor	Make	Time	Gap
1	1	(France) Richard Sainct	BMW	3:22:46		1	(France) Richard Sainct	BMW	3:22:46	
1	2	(Spain) Nani Roma	KTM	3:23:26	0:40	2	(Spain) Nani Roma	KTM	3:23:26	0:40
1	3	(Spain) Jordi Arcarons	KTM	3:24:55	2:09	3	(Spain) Jordi Arcarons	KTM	3:24:55	2:09
2	1	(Spain) Jordi Arcarons	KTM	2:04:18		1	(Spain) Nani Roma	KTM	5:28:11	
2	2	(Spain) Nani Roma	KTM	2:04:45	0:27	2	(France) Richard Sainct	BMW	5:28:52	0:41
2	3	(France) Richard Sainct	BMW	2:06:06	1:48	3	(Spain) Jordi Arcarons	KTM	5:29:11	1:00
3	1	(Spain) Nani Roma	KTM	2:27:28		1	(Spain) Nani Roma	KTM	7:55:39	
3	2	(Italy) Fabrizio Meoni	KTM	2:36:32	9:02	2	(France) Richard Sainct	BMW	8:07:54	12:15
3	3	(Austria) Heinz Kinigadner	KTM	2:36:48	9:20	3	(Italy) Fabrizio Meoni	KTM	8:14:56	19:17
4	1	(Spain) Nani Roma	KTM	2:27:39		1	(Spain) Nani Roma	KTM	10:23:18	
4	2	(Austria) Heinz Kinigadner	KTM	2:32:20	4:41	2	(France) Richard Sainct	BMW	10:46:09	22:51
4	3	(France) Richard Sainct	BMW	2:38:15	10:36	3	(Austria) Heinz Kinigadner	KTM	10:52:26	29:08
5	1	(Austria) Heinz Kinigadner	KTM	4:13:52		1	(Spain) Nani Roma	KTM	14:27:23	
5	2	(Spain) Nani Roma	KTM	4:14:05	0:13	2	(France) Richard Sainct	BMW	15:00:45	23:22
5	3	(France) Richard Sainct	BMW	4:14:36	0:44	3	(Austria) Heinz Kinigadner	KTM	15:06:18	28:55
6	1	(France) Richard Sainct	BMW	6:14:20		1	(Spain) Nani Roma	KTM	20:52:43	
6	2	(Spain) Nani Roma	KTM	6:15:20	1:00	2	(France) Richard Sainct	BMW	21:15:05	22:22
6	3	(Portugal) Paulo Manuel Marques	KTM	6:20:30	6:10	3	(Austria) Heinz Kinigadner	KTM	21:36:14	43:31
7	1	(Austria) Heinz Kinigadner	KTM	57:23		1	(Spain) Nani Roma	KTM	21:52:40	
7	2	(Spain) Nani Roma	KTM	59:57	2:34	2	(France) Richard Sainct	BMW	22:15:41	23:01
7	3	(France) Richard Sainct	BMW	1:00:36	3:13	3	(Austria) Heinz Kinigadner	KTM	22:33:37	40:57
8	1	(South Africa) Alfie Cox	KTM	5:54:15		1	(Spain) Nani Roma	KTM	27:50:56	
8	2	(Germany) Jurgen Mayer	KTM	5:55:23	1:08	2	(France) Richard Sainct	BMW	28:12:56	22:00
8	3	(United States) Jimmy Lewis	BMW	5:56:14	1:59	3	(Spain) Oscar Gallardo	BMW	28:58:17	1:07:21
9	1	(United States) Jimmy Lewis	BMW	5:02:05		1	(Spain) Nani Roma	KTM	32:53:54	
9	2	(South Africa) Alfie Cox	KTM	5:02:07	0:02	2	(France) Richard Sainct	BMW	33:15:53	21:59
9	3	(Spain) Oscar Gallardo	BMW	5:02:13	0:08	3	(Spain) Oscar Gallardo	BMW	34:00:30	1:06:36
10	1	(Spain) Oscar Gallardo	BMW	7:09:24		1	(France) Richard Sainct	BMW	40:25:25	
10	1	(United States) Jimmy Lewis	BMW	7:09:24		2	(Spain) Oscar Gallardo	BMW	41:09:54	44:29
10	3	(France) Richard Sainct	BMW	7:09:32	0:08	3	(United States) Jimmy Lewis	BMW	41:32:25	1:07:00
11	1	(Spain) Isidre Esteve	KTM	3:35:08		1	(France) Richard Sainct	BMW	44:03:23	
11	2	(Sweden) Per-Gunnar Lundmark	KTM	3:36:14	1:06	2	(Spain) Oscar Gallardo	BMW	44:49:39	45:16
11	3	(France) Jean Brucy	BMW	3:36:58	1:50	3	(United States) Jimmy Lewis	BMW	45:12:10	1:08:47
12	1	(Spain) Nani Roma	KTM	4:28:19		1	(France) Richard Sainct	BMW	49:04:32	
12	2	(South Africa) Alfie Cox	KTM	4:39:44	11:25	2	(Spain) Oscar Gallardo	BMW	49:37:20	32:48
12	3	(Sweden) Per-Gunnar Lundmark	KTM	4:41:11	12:52	3	(United States) Jimmy Lewis	BMW	49:58:00	53:28
13	1	(Spain) Nani Roma	KTM	3:22		1	(France) Richard Sainct	BMW	49:08:56	
13	2	(Netherlands) Henk Knuiman	KTM	3:24	0:02	2	(Spain) Oscar Gallardo	BMW	49:40:50	31:54
13	2	(France) Eric Bernard	KTM	3:24	0:02	3	(United States) Jimmy Lewis	BMW	50:01:25	52:29

=== Cars ===
	Stage result					General classification				
Stage	Pos	Competitor	Make	Time	Gap	Pos	Competitor	Make	Time	Gap
1	1	(Portugal) Carlos Sousa (Portugal) João Luz	Mitsubishi	3:24:49		1	(Portugal) Carlos Sousa (Portugal) João Luz	Mitsubishi	3:24:49	
1	2	(Japan) Kenjiro Shinozuka (France) Dominique Serieys	Mitsubishi	3:25:16	0:27	2	(Japan) Kenjiro Shinozuka (France) Dominique Serieys	Mitsubishi	3:25:16	0:27
1	3	(Japan) Hiroshi Masuoka (Germany) Andreas Schulz	Mitsubishi	3:27:32	2:43	3	(Japan) Hiroshi Masuoka (Germany) Andreas Schulz	Mitsubishi	3:27:32	2:43
2	1	(France) Stephane Peterhansel (France) Jean-Paul Cottret	Mega	2:03:33		1	(Japan) Kenjiro Shinozuka (France) Dominique Serieys	Mitsubishi	5:34:18	
2	2	(Spain) José Maria Servia (Belgium) Jean-Marie Lurquin	Schlesser-Renault	2:04:49	1:16	2	(Portugal) Carlos Sousa (Portugal) João Luz	Mitsubishi	5:34:43	0:25
2	3	(France) Jean-Louis Schlesser (Andorra) Henri Magne	Schlesser-Renault	2:05:20	1:47	3	(Japan) Hiroshi Masuoka (Germany) Andreas Schulz	Mitsubishi	5:35:55	1:37
2	3	(Belgium) Grégoire De Mévius (France) Thierry Delli Zotti	Nissan	2:05:20	1:47	3	(Japan) Hiroshi Masuoka (Germany) Andreas Schulz	Mitsubishi	5:35:55	1:37
3	1	(Japan) Kenjiro Shinozuka (France) Dominique Serieys	Mitsubishi	2:42:38		1	(Japan) Kenjiro Shinozuka (France) Dominique Serieys	Mitsubishi	8:16:56	
3	2	(France) Jean-Pierre Fontenay (France) Gilles Picard	Mitsubishi	2:43:52	1:14	2	(France) Jean-Pierre Fontenay (France) Gilles Picard	Mitsubishi	8:20:59	3:33
3	3	(France) Jean-Louis Schlesser (Andorra) Henri Magne	Schlesser-Renault	2:47:37	4:59	3	(Japan) Hiroshi Masuoka (Germany) Andreas Schulz	Mitsubishi	8:24:00	7:04
4	1	(Germany) Jutta Kleinschmidt (Sweden) Tina Thörner	Mitsubishi	2:20:45		1	(Japan) Kenjiro Shinozuka (France) Dominique Serieys	Mitsubishi	10:39:42	
4	2	(France) Jean-Louis Schlesser (Andorra) Henri Magne	Schlesser-Renault	2:20:51	0:06	2	(France) Jean-Pierre Fontenay (France) Gilles Picard	Mitsubishi	10:44:42	5:00
4	3	(France) Bruno Saby (France) Yves Truelle	Ford	2:21:16	0:31	3	(France) Jean-Louis Schlesser (Andorra) Henri Magne	Schlesser-Renault	10:46:34	6:52
5	1	(France) Jean-Louis Schlesser (Andorra) Henri Magne	Schlesser-Renault	3:55:04		1	(Japan) Kenjiro Shinozuka (France) Dominique Serieys	Mitsubishi	14:35:38	
5	2	(France) Stephane Peterhansel (France) Jean-Paul Cottret	Mega	3:55:12	0:08	2	(France) Jean-Louis Schlesser (Andorra) Henri Magne	Schlesser-Renault	14:41:38	6:00
5	3	(Japan) Kenjiro Shinozuka (France) Dominique Serieys	Mitsubishi	3:55:56	0:52	3	(France) Stephane Peterhansel (France) Jean-Paul Cottret	Mega	14:45:48	10:10
6	1	(Portugal) Carlos Sousa (Portugal) João Luz	Mitsubishi	5:46:02		1	(Japan) Kenjiro Shinozuka (France) Dominique Serieys	Mitsubishi	20:25:33	
6	2	(France) Stephane Peterhansel (France) Jean-Paul Cottret	Mega	5:47:51	1:49	2	(France) Jean-Louis Schlesser (Andorra) Henri Magne	Schlesser-Renault	20:31:48	6:15
6	3	(Japan) Kenjiro Shinozuka (France) Dominique Serieys	Mitsubishi	5:49:55	3:53	3	(France) Stephane Peterhansel (France) Jean-Paul Cottret	Mega	20:33:39	8:06
7	1	(France) Jean-Pierre Fontenay (France) Gilles Picard	Mitsubishi	57:24		1	(Japan) Kenjiro Shinozuka (France) Dominique Serieys	Mitsubishi	21:25:07	
7	2	(France) Thierry Delavergne (France) Jacky Dubois	Nissan	58:23	0:59	2	(France) Jean-Louis Schlesser (Andorra) Henri Magne	Schlesser-Renault	21:32:17	7:10
7	3	(Germany) Jutta Kleinschmidt (Sweden) Tina Thörner	Mitsubishi	58:53	1:29	3	(France) Stephane Peterhansel (France) Jean-Paul Cottret	Mega	21:33:08	8:01
8	1	(France) Jean-Louis Schlesser (Andorra) Henri Magne	Schlesser-Renault	5:10:34		1	(France) Jean-Louis Schlesser (Andorra) Henri Magne	Schlesser-Renault	26:42:51	
8	2	(Spain) José Maria Servia (Belgium) Jean-Marie Lurquin	Schlesser-Renault	5:14:54	4:20	2	(France) Stephane Peterhansel (France) Jean-Paul Cottret	Mega	26:52:52	10:01
8	3	(France) Stephane Peterhansel (France) Jean-Paul Cottret	Mega	5:19:44	9:10	3	(Japan) Kenjiro Shinozuka (France) Dominique Serieys	Mitsubishi	26:56:21	13:30
9	1	(France) Stephane Peterhansel (France) Jean-Paul Cottret	Mega	4:25:13		1	(France) Jean-Louis Schlesser (Andorra) Henri Magne	Schlesser-Renault	31:09:09	
9	2	(France) Jean-Louis Schlesser (Andorra) Henri Magne	Schlesser-Renault	4:26:18	1:05	2	(France) Stephane Peterhansel (France) Jean-Paul Cottret	Mega	31:18:05	8:56
9	3	(Spain) José Maria Servia (Belgium) Jean-Marie Lurquin	Schlesser-Renault	4:28:32	3:19	3	(France) Jean-Pierre Fontenay (France) Gilles Picard	Mitsubishi	31:25:28	26:19
10	1	(Spain) José Maria Servia (Belgium) Jean-Marie Lurquin	Schlesser-Renault	6:32:43		1	(France) Jean-Louis Schlesser (Andorra) Henri Magne	Schlesser-Renault	37:41:56	
10	2	(France) Jean-Louis Schlesser (Andorra) Henri Magne	Schlesser-Renault	6:32:47	0:04	2	(France) Stephane Peterhansel (France) Jean-Paul Cottret	Mega	37:55:12	13:16
10	3	(France) Stephane Peterhansel (France) Jean-Paul Cottret	Mega	6:37:07	4:24	3	(France) Jean-Pierre Fontenay (France) Gilles Picard	Mitsubishi	38:13:44	31:48
11	1	(France) Jean-Pierre Fontenay (France) Gilles Picard	Mitsubishi	3:02:52		1	(France) Jean-Louis Schlesser (Andorra) Henri Magne	Schlesser-Renault	40:47:29	
11	2	(Japan) Hiroshi Masuoka (Germany) Andreas Schulz	Mitsubishi	3:04:14	1:22	2	(France) Stephane Peterhansel (France) Jean-Paul Cottret	Mega	41:00:45	13:16
11	3	(Germany) Jutta Kleinschmidt (Sweden) Tina Thörner	Mitsubishi	3:05:11	2:19	3	(France) Jean-Pierre Fontenay (France) Gilles Picard	Mitsubishi	41:16:36	29:07
12	1	(Japan) Hiroshi Masuoka (Germany) Andreas Schulz	Mitsubishi	4:09:00		1	(France) Jean-Louis Schlesser (Andorra) Henri Magne	Schlesser-Renault	45:02:18	
12	2	(Spain) José Maria Servia (Belgium) Jean-Marie Lurquin	Schlesser-Renault	4:11:08	2:08	2	(France) Stephane Peterhansel (France) Jean-Paul Cottret	Mega	45:14:32	12:14
12	3	(France) Jean-Pierre Fontenay (France) Gilles Picard	Mitsubishi	4:13:18	4:18	3	(France) Jean-Pierre Fontenay (France) Gilles Picard	Mitsubishi	45:29:54	27:36
13	1	(Spain) José Maria Servia (Belgium) Jean-Marie Lurquin	Schlesser-Renault	3:34		1	(France) Jean-Louis Schlesser (Andorra) Henri Magne	Schlesser-Renault	45:06:03	
13	2	(Germany) Jutta Kleinschmidt (Sweden) Tina Thörner	Mitsubishi	3:38	0:04	2	(France) Stephane Peterhansel (France) Jean-Paul Cottret	Mega	45:18:36	12:33
13	3	(France) Jean-Pierre Fontenay (France) Gilles Picard	Mitsubishi	3:42	0:08	3	(France) Jean-Pierre Fontenay (France) Gilles Picard	Mitsubishi	45:33:36	27:33

=== Trucks ===
	Stage result					General classification				
Stage	Pos	Competitor	Make	Time	Gap	Pos	Competitor	Make	Time	Gap
1	1	(Brazil) André de Azevedo (Czech Republic) Tomáš Tomeček (Czech Republic) Petr Vodák	Tatra	4:30:55		1	(Brazil) André de Azevedo (Czech Republic) Tomáš Tomeček (Czech Republic) Petr Vodák	Tatra	4:30:55	
1	2	(Czech Republic) Bedřich Sklenovský (Czech Republic) Milan Koreny (Czech Republic) Josef Kalina	Tatra	4:33:15	2:20	2	(Czech Republic) Bedřich Sklenovský (Czech Republic) Milan Koreny (Czech Republic) Josef Kalina	Tatra	4:33:15	2:20
1	3	(Russia) Vladimir Chagin (Russia) Semen Yakubov (Russia) Sergey Savostin	Kamaz	4:34:07	3:12	3	(Russia) Vladimir Chagin (Russia) Semen Yakubov (Russia) Sergey Savostin	Kamaz	4:34:07	3:12
2	1	(Russia) Vladimir Chagin (Russia) Semen Yakubov (Russia) Sergey Savostin	Kamaz	2:49:26		1	(Russia) Vladimir Chagin (Russia) Semen Yakubov (Russia) Sergey Savostin	Kamaz	7:23:33	
2	2	(Japan) Yoshimasa Sugawara (Japan) Seiichi Suzuki (Japan) Teruhito Sugawara	Hino	2:53:28	4:02	2	(Brazil) André de Azevedo (Czech Republic) Tomáš Tomeček (Czech Republic) Petr Vodák	Tatra	7:27:34	4:01
2	3	(Czech Republic) Karel Loprais (Czech Republic) Radomír Stachura (Czech Republic) Petr Gilar	Tatra	2:54:19	4:53	3	(Japan) Yoshimasa Sugawara (Japan) Seiichi Suzuki (Japan) Teruhito Sugawara	Hino	7:35:02	11:29
3	1	(Russia) Vladimir Chagin (Russia) Semen Yakubov (Russia) Sergey Savostin	Kamaz	3:48:26		1	(Russia) Vladimir Chagin (Russia) Semen Yakubov (Russia) Sergey Savostin	Kamaz	11:11:59	
3	2	(Czech Republic) Karel Loprais (Czech Republic) Radomír Stachura (Czech Republic) Petr Gilar	Tatra	3:58:00	9:34	2	(Russia) Firdaus Kabirov (Russia) Aydar Belyaev (Russia) Vladimir Goloub	Kamaz	11:34:02	22:03
3	3	(Russia) Firdaus Kabirov (Russia) Aydar Belyaev (Russia) Vladimir Goloub	Kamaz	3:59:00	10:34	3	(Brazil) André de Azevedo (Czech Republic) Tomáš Tomeček (Czech Republic) Petr Vodák	Tatra	11:35:31	23:32
4	1	(Russia) Vladimir Chagin (Russia) Semen Yakubov (Russia) Sergey Savostin	Kamaz	3:02:25		1	(Russia) Vladimir Chagin (Russia) Semen Yakubov (Russia) Sergey Savostin	Kamaz	14:14:24	
4	2	(Czech Republic) Karel Loprais (Czech Republic) Radomír Stachura (Czech Republic) Petr Gilar	Tatra	3:13:00	10:35	2	(Russia) Firdaus Kabirov (Russia) Aydar Belyaev (Russia) Vladimir Goloub	Kamaz	14:50:56	22:03
4	3	(France) Raphael Gimbre (France) François Marcheix (France) Ai Nhat Bui	Mercedes-Benz	3:14:31	12:06	3	(Czech Republic) Karel Loprais (Czech Republic) Radomír Stachura (Czech Republic) Petr Gilar	Tatra	14:53:09	38:45
5	1	(Brazil) André de Azevedo (Czech Republic) Tomáš Tomeček (Czech Republic) Petr Vodák	Tatra	5:24:49		1	(Russia) Vladimir Chagin (Russia) Semen Yakubov (Russia) Sergey Savostin	Kamaz	19:45:11	
5	2	(Czech Republic) Karel Loprais (Czech Republic) Radomír Stachura (Czech Republic) Petr Gilar	Tatra	5:29:28	4:39	2	(Brazil) André de Azevedo (Czech Republic) Tomáš Tomeček (Czech Republic) Petr Vodák	Tatra	20:19:59	34:48
5	3	(Russia) Vladimir Chagin (Russia) Semen Yakubov (Russia) Sergey Savostin	Kamaz	5:30:47	5:58	3	(Czech Republic) Karel Loprais (Czech Republic) Radomír Stachura (Czech Republic) Petr Gilar	Tatra	20:22:37	37:26
6	1	(Russia) Firdaus Kabirov (Russia) Aydar Belyaev (Russia) Vladimir Goloub	Kamaz	7:51:46		1	(Russia) Vladimir Chagin (Russia) Semen Yakubov (Russia) Sergey Savostin	Kamaz	27:47:38	
6	2	(Russia) Vladimir Chagin (Russia) Semen Yakubov (Russia) Sergey Savostin	Kamaz	8:02:27	10:41	2	(Brazil) André de Azevedo (Czech Republic) Tomáš Tomeček (Czech Republic) Petr Vodák	Tatra	28:27:43	40:05
6	3	(Brazil) André de Azevedo (Czech Republic) Tomáš Tomeček (Czech Republic) Petr Vodák	Tatra	8:07:44	15:58	3	(Russia) Firdaus Kabirov (Russia) Aydar Belyaev (Russia) Vladimir Goloub	Kamaz	28:40:24	52:46
7	1	(Russia) Firdaus Kabirov (Russia) Aydar Belyaev (Russia) Vladimir Goloub	Kamaz	1:05:37		1	(Russia) Vladimir Chagin (Russia) Semen Yakubov (Russia) Sergey Savostin	Kamaz	28:55:03	
7	2	(Russia) Vladimir Chagin (Russia) Semen Yakubov (Russia) Sergey Savostin	Kamaz	1:07:25	1:48	2	(Brazil) André de Azevedo (Czech Republic) Tomáš Tomeček (Czech Republic) Petr Vodák	Tatra	29:37:30	42:27
7	3	(Brazil) André de Azevedo (Czech Republic) Tomáš Tomeček (Czech Republic) Petr Vodák	Tatra	1:09:47	4:10	3	(Russia) Firdaus Kabirov (Russia) Aydar Belyaev (Russia) Vladimir Goloub	Kamaz	29:46:01	50:58
8	1	(Russia) Firdaus Kabirov (Russia) Aydar Belyaev (Russia) Vladimir Goloub	Kamaz	6:16:24		1	(Russia) Vladimir Chagin (Russia) Semen Yakubov (Russia) Sergey Savostin	Kamaz	35:14:49	
8	2	(Russia) Vladimir Chagin (Russia) Semen Yakubov (Russia) Sergey Savostin	Kamaz	6:19:46	3:22	2	(Brazil) André de Azevedo (Czech Republic) Tomáš Tomeček (Czech Republic) Petr Vodák	Tatra	35:59:33	44:44
8	3	(Czech Republic) Karel Loprais (Czech Republic) Radomír Stachura (Czech Republic) Petr Gilar	Tatra	6:20:55	4:31	3	(Russia) Firdaus Kabirov (Russia) Aydar Belyaev (Russia) Vladimir Goloub	Kamaz	36:02:25	47:36
9	1	(Czech Republic) Karel Loprais (Czech Republic) Radomír Stachura (Czech Republic) Petr Gilar	Tatra	5:23:46		1	(Russia) Vladimir Chagin (Russia) Semen Yakubov (Russia) Sergey Savostin	Kamaz	41:06:21	
9	2	(Brazil) André de Azevedo (Czech Republic) Tomáš Tomeček (Czech Republic) Petr Vodák	Tatra	5:23:57	0:11	2	(Brazil) André de Azevedo (Czech Republic) Tomáš Tomeček (Czech Republic) Petr Vodák	Tatra	41:23:30	17:09
9	3	(Russia) Vladimir Chagin (Russia) Semen Yakubov (Russia) Sergey Savostin	Kamaz	5:51:32	27:46	3	(Czech Republic) Karel Loprais (Czech Republic) Radomír Stachura (Czech Republic) Petr Gilar	Tatra	41:40:05	33:44
10	1	(Russia) Vladimir Chagin (Russia) Semen Yakubov (Russia) Sergey Savostin	Kamaz	7:36:30		1	(Russia) Vladimir Chagin (Russia) Semen Yakubov (Russia) Sergey Savostin	Kamaz	48:42:51	
10	2	(Czech Republic) Karel Loprais (Czech Republic) Radomír Stachura (Czech Republic) Petr Gilar	Tatra	7:37:02	0:32	2	(Brazil) André de Azevedo (Czech Republic) Tomáš Tomeček (Czech Republic) Petr Vodák	Tatra	49:03:11	20:20
10	3	(Brazil) André de Azevedo (Czech Republic) Tomáš Tomeček (Czech Republic) Petr Vodák	Tatra	7:39:41	3:11	3	(Czech Republic) Karel Loprais (Czech Republic) Radomír Stachura (Czech Republic) Petr Gilar	Tatra	49:17:07	34:16
11	1	(Czech Republic) Karel Loprais (Czech Republic) Radomír Stachura (Czech Republic) Petr Gilar	Tatra	3:48:22		1	(Russia) Vladimir Chagin (Russia) Semen Yakubov (Russia) Sergey Savostin	Kamaz	52:41:31	
11	2	(Russia) Firdaus Kabirov (Russia) Aydar Belyaev (Russia) Vladimir Goloub	Kamaz	3:48:37	0:15	2	(Brazil) André de Azevedo (Czech Republic) Tomáš Tomeček (Czech Republic) Petr Vodák	Tatra	49:03:11	20:20
11	3	(Brazil) André de Azevedo (Czech Republic) Tomáš Tomeček (Czech Republic) Petr Vodák	Tatra	3:51:33	3:11	3	(Czech Republic) Karel Loprais (Czech Republic) Radomír Stachura (Czech Republic) Petr Gilar	Tatra	49:17:07	34:16
12	1	(Czech Republic) Karel Loprais (Czech Republic) Radomír Stachura (Czech Republic) Petr Gilar	Tatra	5:27:31		1	(Russia) Vladimir Chagin (Russia) Semen Yakubov (Russia) Sergey Savostin	Kamaz	58:16:39	
12	2	(Russia) Vladimir Chagin (Russia) Semen Yakubov (Russia) Sergey Savostin	Kamaz	5:35:08	7:37	2	(Czech Republic) Karel Loprais (Czech Republic) Radomír Stachura (Czech Republic) Petr Gilar	Tatra	58:33:00	16:22
12	3	(Japan) Yoshimasa Sugawara (Japan) Seiichi Suzuki (Japan) Teruhito Sugawara	Hino	6:00:36	33:05	3	(Brazil) André de Azevedo (Czech Republic) Tomáš Tomeček (Czech Republic) Petr Vodák	Tatra	59:40:50	1:24:11
13	1	(Russia) Firdaus Kabirov (Russia) Aydar Belyaev (Russia) Vladimir Goloub	Kamaz	4:19		1	(Russia) Vladimir Chagin (Russia) Semen Yakubov (Russia) Sergey Savostin	Kamaz	58:21:42	
13	2	(Brazil) André de Azevedo (Czech Republic) Tomáš Tomeček (Czech Republic) Petr Vodák	Tatra	4:33	0:14	2	(Czech Republic) Karel Loprais (Czech Republic) Radomír Stachura (Czech Republic) Petr Gilar	Tatra	58:37:52	16:10
13	3	(Czech Republic) Karel Loprais (Czech Republic) Radomír Stachura (Czech Republic) Petr Gilar	Tatra	4:52	0:33	3	(Russia) Firdaus Kabirov (Russia) Aydar Belyaev (Russia) Vladimir Goloub	Kamaz	59:45:18	1:23:36

== Final standings ==
=== Motorcycles ===
Pos	No.	Rider	Bike	Entrant	Time
1	1	(France) Richard Sainct	BMW	BMW Motorrad	49:08:56
2	5	(Spain) Oscar Gallardo	BMW	BMW Motorrad	+31:54
3	8	(United States) Jimmy Lewis	BMW	BMW Motorrad	+52:29
4	19	(France) Jean Brucy	BMW	BMW Motorrad	+2:06:25
5	15	(Germany) Jurgen Mayer	KTM	KTM International	+3:10:28
6	14	(France) Eric Bernard	KTM	E.Leclerc-Oxbow	+3:44:53
7	22	(France) François Flick	KTM	L'Allier Dynamique	+4:36:50
8	30	(Netherlands) Henk Knuiman	KTM		+6:11:03
9	21	(Portugal) Bernardo Vilar	KTM	Vitamina B Telecel	+6:40:47
10	77	(Japan) Ikemachi Yoshio	Honda		+6:57:26

=== Cars ===
Pos	No.	Driver	Co-Driver	Car	Entrant	Time
1	250	(France) Jean-Louis Schlesser	(Andorra) Henri Magne	Schlesser-Renault	Schlesser-Renault-Elf	45:06:03
2	270	(France) Stéphane Peterhansel	(France) Jean-Paul Cottret	Mega		+12:33
3	251	(France) Jean-Pierre Fontenay	(France) Gilles Picard	Mitsubishi	Sonauto Mitsubishi	+27:33
4	253	(Spain) José Maria Servia	(Belgium) Jean-Marie Lurquin	Schlesser-Renault	Schlesser-Renault-Elf	+38:50
5	256	(Germany) Jutta Kleinschmidt	(Sweden) Tina Thörner	Mitsubishi	Sonauto Mitsubishi	+1:09:00
6	271	(Japan) Hiroshi Masuoka	(Germany) Andreas Schulz	Mitsubishi	Sonauto Mitsubishi	+1:41:12
7	252	(France) Bruno Saby	(France) Yves Truelle	Ford	ASM Racecars	+2:43:15
8	255	(France) Thierry Delavergne	(France) Jacky Dubois	Nissan	Nissan Motorsport	+3:39:28
9	276	(France) Henri Pescarolo	(France) Alain Guehennec	Nissan	Generale Routiere	+5:03:10
10	283	(Spain) Ramón Vila	(Spain) Rosendo Tourinan	Nissan	Nissan Tecnosport	+6:46:26

=== Trucks ===
Pos	No.	Driver	Co-Drivers	Truck	Time
1	409	(Russia) Vladimir Chagin	(Russia) Semen Yakubov (Russia) Sergey Savostin	Kamaz	+58:21:42
2	407	(Czech Republic) Karel Loprais	(Czech Republic) Radomir Stachura (Czech Republic) Petr Gilar	Tatra	+16:10
3	416	(Russia) Firdaus Kabirov	(Russia) Aydar Belyaev (Russia) Vladimir Goloub	Kamaz	+1:23:26
4	408	(Brazil) André de Azevedo	(Czech Republic) Tomas Tomecek (Czech Republic) Petr Vodak	Tatra	+1:23:41
5	400	(Japan) Yoshimasa Sugawara	(Japan) Seiichi Suzuki (Japan) Teruhito Sugawara	Hino	+4:40:02
6	414	(Czech Republic) Bedrich Sklenovsky	(Czech Republic) Milan Koreny (Czech Republic) Josef Kalina	Tatra	+5:13:32
7	404	(Germany) Klaus Bauerle	(Germany) Anek Schurhagl	Mercedes-Benz	+9:38:44
8	418	(France) Jean-Paul Bosonnet	(France) Serge Lacourt (France) Pascal Bonnaire	Tatra	+12:44:05
9	421	(France) Raphael Gimbre	(France) François Marcheix (France) Ai Nhat Bui	Mercedes-Benz	+13:29:53
10	415	(Austria) Peter Reif	(Austria) Johann Deinhofer (Germany) Holger Hermann Roth	MAN	+15:33:50
