= 2004 Dakar Rally =

Off-road motorsport event in Europe and Africa

← Previous event	Next event →
- Host country: France; Spain; Morocco / (Sahrawi Arab Democratic Republic) Western Sahara; Mauritania; Mali; Burkina Faso; Senegal

Results
- Cars winner: (France) Stéphane Peterhansel (France) Jean-Paul Cottret; Mitsubishi
- Bikes winner: (Spain) Nani Roma; KTM
- Trucks winner: (Russia) Vladimir Chagin (Russia) Semen Yakubov (Russia) Sergey Savostin; Kamaz

2004 Dakar Rally also known as the 2004 Paris-Dakar Rally was the 26th running of the Dakar Rally event. The rally started in the Auvergne region of France, passing through Spain, Morocco, Western Sahara, Mauritania, Mali and Burkina Faso, and finishing Dakar in Senegal. This was the last time the rally ever visited France. The rally was won by the French team of Stéphane Peterhansel and Jean-Paul Cottret in a Mitsubishi; while the motorcycle class was won by Nani Roma of Spain on a KTM and the trucks class was won by Russians Vladimir Chagin, Semen Yakubov and Sergey Savostin in a Kamaz.

== Entries ==
Number of participants
Stage	Bikes	Cars	Trucks	Total
Start of Rally	195	142	63	400
End of Rally	65	60	38	163

=== Bikes ===
Leading Entries
Manufacturer	Team	No.	Rider
(Austria) KTM	Gauloises KTM France	1	(France) Richard Sainct
(Austria) KTM	Gauloises KTM France	2	(France) Cyril Despres
(Austria) KTM	Gauloises KTM France	9	(France) Jean Brucy
(Austria) KTM	Gauloises KTM International	3	(Italy) Fabrizio Meoni
(Austria) KTM	Gauloises KTM International	7	(Italy) Giovanni Sala
(Austria) KTM	Gauloises KTM International	10	(South Africa) Alfie Cox
(Austria) KTM	Repsol KTM	4	(Spain) Nani Roma
(Austria) KTM	Repsol KTM	11	(Spain) Marc Coma
(Austria) KTM	Repsol KTM	19	(Spain) Isidre Esteve
(Austria) KTM	Petrobras-Lubrax	5	(Brazil) Jean de Azevedo
(Austria) KTM	Team Scandinavia	6	(Sweden) Per-Gunnar Lundmark
(Austria) KTM	Team Scandinavia	15	(Norway) Pål Anders Ullevålseter
(Austria) KTM	KTM De Gavardo	8	(Chile) Carlo de Gavardo
(Austria) KTM	Red Bull USA KTM	16	(United States) Larry Roeseler
(Austria) KTM	Red Bull USA KTM	17	(United States) Paul Krause
(Austria) KTM	Red Bull USA KTM	25	(United States) Scott Harden
(Japan) Yamaha	Yamaha Motor France	12	(France) David Frétigné

=== Cars ===
Leading Entries
Manufacturer	Team	No.	Driver	Co-Driver
(France) Schlesser	Schlesser-Ford Raid	200	(France) Jean-Louis Schlesser	(Belgium) Jean-Marie Lurquin
(France) Schlesser	Schlesser-Ford Raid	209	(Spain) José Maria Servia	(France) François Borsotto
(Japan) Mitsubishi	Mitsubishi Motors	201	(Japan) Hiroshi Masuoka	(France) Gilles Picard
(Japan) Mitsubishi	Mitsubishi Motors	203	(France) Stéphane Peterhansel	(France) Jean-Paul Cottret
(Japan) Mitsubishi	Mitsubishi Motors	206	(Italy) Miki Biasion	(Italy) Tiziano Siviero
(Japan) Mitsubishi	Mitsubishi Motors	211	(Germany) Andrea Mayer	(Germany) Andreas Schulz
(Japan) Mitsubishi	Ralliart	218	(Spain) José Luis Monterde	(Spain) Rafael Tornabell
(Japan) Mitsubishi	Ralliart	259	(Qatar) Nasser Al-Attiyah	(Belgium) Marc Bartholome
(Japan) Nissan	Nissan Rally Raid Team	202	(United Kingdom) Colin McRae	(Sweden) Tina Thörner
(Japan) Nissan	Nissan Rally Raid Team	205	(Finland) Ari Vatanen	(Finland) Juha Repo
(Japan) Nissan	Nissan Rally Raid Team	208	(South Africa) Giniel de Villiers	(South Africa) François Jordaan
(Japan) Nissan	Nissan Rally Raid Team	210	(France) Yves Loubet	(France) Pascal Maimon
(Japan) Nissan	Nissan Dessoude	215	(Japan) Kenjiro Shinozuka	(France) Arnaud Debron
(Japan) Nissan	Nissan Dessoude	228	(France) Paul Belmondo	(France) Willy Alcaraz
(Japan) Nissan	Nissan Dessoude	234	(France) René Metge	(France) Bernard Chevalier
(Germany) Volkswagen	Volkswagen Motorsport	204	(Germany) Jutta Kleinschmidt	(Italy) Fabrizia Pons
(Germany) Volkswagen	Volkswagen Motorsport	224	(France) Bruno Saby	(United Kingdom) Matthew Stevenson
(Germany) BMW	X-Raid	207	(France) Luc Alphand	(Andorra) Henri Magne
(Germany) BMW	X-Raid	212	(Belgium) Grégoire de Mévius	(France) Alain Guehennec
(France) SMG	SMG	216	(France) Philippe Gache	(France) Jean-Pierre Garcin
(Japan) Honda	Fast & Speed	225	(France) Thierry Magnaldi	(France) Didier Le Gal

=== Trucks ===
Leading Entries
Manufacturer	Team	No.	Driver	Co-Drivers
(Japan) Hino	Sugawara	400	(Japan) Yoshimasa Sugawara	(Japan) Seiichi Suzuki (Japan) Teruhito Sugawara
(Russia) Kamaz	Kamaz-Master	410	(Russia) Firdaus Kabirov	(Russia) Aydar Belyaev (Russia) Dzhamil Kamalov
(Russia) Kamaz	Kamaz-Master	414	(Russia) Vladimir Chagin	(Russia) Semen Yakubov (Russia) Sergey Savostin
(Russia) Kamaz	Kamaz-Master	423	(Russia) Ilgizar Mardeev	(Russia) Sergey Girya (Russia) Eduard Kupriyanov
(Netherlands) DAF	Team De Rooy	411	(Netherlands) Jan de Rooy	(Belgium) Dany Colebunders (Belgium) Hugo Duisters
(Netherlands) DAF	Team De Rooy	417	(Netherlands) Gerard de Rooy	(Belgium) Tom Colsoul (Netherlands) Arno Slaats
(Netherlands) DAF	Tridec	442	(Netherlands) Hans Stacey	(Netherlands) Toon van Genugten (Belgium) Eddy Chevallier
(Czech Republic) Tatra	Petrobras-Lubrax	412	(Brazil) André de Azevedo	(Czech Republic) Tomáš Tomeček (Czech Republic) Jaromír Martinec
(Czech Republic) Tatra	Loprais Tatra	415	(Czech Republic) Karel Loprais	(Czech Republic) Petr Gilar (Czech Republic) Josef Kalina
(Germany) Mercedes-Benz	Vismara Sport System	425	(Italy) Giacomo Vismara	(Italy) Mario Cambiaghi (Italy) Claudio Bellina

== Stages ==
Stage	Date	From	To	Total (km)	Stage winners		
Stage	Date	From	To	Total (km)	Bikes	Cars	Trucks
1	1 January	(France) Clermont-Ferrand	(France) Narbonne	396	(Italy) M. Graziani	(Japan) K. Shinozuka	(Russia) V. Chagin
2	2 January	(France) Narbonne	(Spain) Castellón de la Plana	526	(France) D. Frétigné	(Spain) J. M. Servia	Stage cancelled^{1}
3	3 January	(Spain) Castellón de la Plana	(Morocco) Tangier	865	(France) D. Frétigné	(South Africa) G. de Villiers	(Netherlands) G. de Rooy
4	4 January	(Morocco) Tangier	(Morocco) Er Rachidia	752	(Italy) F. Meoni	(Finland) A. Vatanen	(Russia) F. Kabirov
5	5 January	(Morocco) Er Rachidia	(Morocco) Ouarzazate	575	(Spain) I. Esteve	(France) S. Peterhansel	(Russia) V. Chagin
6	6 January	(Morocco) Ouarzazate	(Morocco) Tan-Tan	803	(Spain) N. Roma	(Japan) H. Masuoka	(Russia) V. Chagin
7	7 January	(Morocco) Tan-Tan	(Mauritania) Atar	1055	(France) R. Sainct	(Japan) H. Masuoka	(Russia) V. Chagin
8	8 January	(Mauritania) Atar	(Mauritania) Tidjikja	393	(Spain) N. Roma	(France) S. Peterhansel	(Czech Republic) K. Loprais
9	9 January	(Mauritania) Tidjikja	(Mauritania) Néma	739	(France) C. Despres	(Japan) H. Masuoka	(Russia) F. Kabirov
10	10 January	(Mauritania) Néma	(Mali) Mopti	Stages cancelled			
11	11 January	(Mali) Mopti	(Burkina Faso) Bobo-Dioulasso	Stages cancelled			
	12 January	(Burkina Faso) Bobo-Dioulasso		Rest day			
12	13 January	(Burkina Faso) Bobo-Dioulasso	(Mali) Bamako	666	(France) C. Despres	(France) L. Alphand	(Russia) F. Kabirov
13	14 January	(Mali) Bamako	(Mauritania) Ayoun el Atrous	734	(France) D. Frétigné	(United Kingdom) C. McRae	(Czech Republic) K. Loprais
14	15 January	(Mauritania) Ayoun el Atrous	(Mauritania) Tidjikja	551	(France) C. Despres	(France) L. Alphand	(Russia) F. Kabirov
15	16 January	(Mauritania) Tidjikja	(Mauritania) Nouakchott	651	(Italy) F. Meoni	(Japan) H. Masuoka	(Russia) F. Kabirov
16	17 January	(Mauritania) Nouakchott	(Senegal) Dakar	647	(France) R. Sainct	(Germany) J. Kleinschmidt	(Russia) F. Kabirov
17	18 January	(Senegal) Dakar		106	(France) C. Despres	(United Kingdom) C. McRae	(Netherlands) H. Stacey

Notes:

- ^1 — The event for trucks was cancelled due to hazardous conditions.

== Summary ==
The competitors included former world rally champion Colin McRae. Stephane Peterhansel took an early lead after the third stage. Four times winner of the rally, Ari Vatanen, won the fourth stage, which was his 50th individual stage win at the Dakar Rally. Peterhansel received a five minutes penalty after his team-mate pushed his car when it encountered gearbox trouble 300m from the finishing line of the fifth stage but retained his overall lead. McRae moved up to third place after the sixth stage but lost time on the seventh stage after getting stuck in a sand dune. Peterhansel retook the lead from overnight leader Hiroshi Masuoka after the eighth stage, and retained it after stage nine. Stages 10 and 11 were cancelled owing to concerns over the security situation in Mali. The rally resumed with stage 12 between Bobo-Dioulasso in Burkina Faso and Bamako in Mali; Peterhansel retained the lead at the end of the stage. McRae won the 13th stage between Bamako and Ayoun el Atrous in Mauritania, the first Briton to win a stage of the Dakar rally since Andrew Cowan in 1990. The 14th, 15th and 16th stages were won by Luc Alphand, Hiroshi Masuoka and Jutta Kleinschmidt. McRae won the final stage but the overall winner was Stephane Peterhansel, who became only the second man to have won both the car and motorcycle categories of the Dakar Rally. The motorcycle category was won by Spaniard Nani Roma.

== Stage results ==
=== Bikes ===
	Stage result					General classification				
Stage	Pos	Competitor	Make	Time	Gap	Pos	Competitor	Make	Time	Gap
1	1	(Italy) Matteo Graziani	KTM	1:24		Stage not counted towards overall classification				
1	2	(France) Cyril Despres	KTM	1:32	0:08	Stage not counted towards overall classification				
1	3	(France) Richard Sainct	KTM	1:33	0:09	Stage not counted towards overall classification				
2	1	(France) David Frétigné	Yamaha	22:47		1	(France) David Frétigné	Yamaha	22:47	
2	2	(France) Cyril Despres	KTM	23:02	0:15	2	(France) Cyril Despres	KTM	23:02	0:15
2	3	(Spain) Nani Roma	KTM	23:44	0:57	3	(Spain) Nani Roma	KTM	23:44	0:57
3	1	(France) David Frétigné	Yamaha	6:13		1	(France) David Frétigné	Yamaha	29:00	
3	2	(France) Cyril Despres	KTM	6:14	0:01	2	(France) Cyril Despres	KTM	29:16	0:16
3	3	(Italy) Giovanni Sala	KTM	6:18	0:05	3	(Italy) Giovanni Sala	KTM	30:06	1:06
4	1	(Italy) Fabrizio Meoni	KTM	41:53		1	(Spain) Isidre Esteve	KTM	1:13:29	
4	2	(South Africa) Alfie Cox	KTM	42:36	0:43	2	(Italy) Fabrizio Meoni	KTM	1:13:43	0:14
4	3	(Spain) Isidre Esteve	KTM	43:06	1:13	3	(France) Cyril Despres	KTM	1:13:46	0:17
5	1	(Spain) Isidre Esteve	KTM	3:44:27		1	(Spain) Isidre Esteve	KTM	4:57:56	
5	2	(Spain) Nani Roma	KTM	3:44:43	0:16	2	(Italy) Fabrizio Meoni	KTM	4:58:32	0:36
5	3	(Italy) Fabrizio Meoni	KTM	3:44:49	0:22	3	(France) Cyril Despres	KTM	4:58:55	0:59
6	1	(Spain) Nani Roma	KTM	3:32:26		1	(Spain) Isidre Esteve	KTM	8:32:47	
6	2	(Spain) Isidre Esteve	KTM	3:34:51	2:25	2	(Spain) Nani Roma	KTM	8:34:41	1:54
6	3	(Australia) Andy Caldecott	KTM	3:36:07	3:41	3	(France) Cyril Despres	KTM	8:35:24	2:37
7	1	(France) Richard Sainct	KTM	6:39:33		1	(France) Cyril Despres	KTM	15:23:30	
7	2	(France) Jean Brucy	KTM	6:46:40	7:07	2	(Spain) Nani Roma	KTM	15:26:33	3:03
7	3	(France) Cyril Despres	KTM	6:48:06	8:33	3	(France) Richard Sainct	KTM	15:26:51	3:21
8	1	(Spain) Nani Roma	KTM	5:38:07		1	(Spain) Nani Roma	KTM	21:04:40	
8	2	(France) Jean Brucy	KTM	5:44:09	6:02	2	(France) Richard Sainct	KTM	21:12:56	8:16
8	3	(France) Richard Sainct	KTM	5:46:05	7:58	3	(France) Jean Brucy	KTM	21:19:05	14:25
9	1	(France) Cyril Despres	KTM	9:34:33		1	(Spain) Nani Roma	KTM	31:05:35	
9	2	(South Africa) Alfie Cox	KTM	9:37:57	3:24	2	(France) Richard Sainct	KTM	31:09:08	3:33
9	3	(France) Richard Sainct	KTM	9:56:12	21:39	3	(South Africa) Alfie Cox	KTM	31:33:56	28:21
10	Stages cancelled due to security concerns									
11	Stages cancelled due to security concerns									
12	1	(France) Cyril Despres	KTM	1:43:13		1	(Spain) Nani Roma	KTM	33:00:13	
12	2	(Spain) Marc Coma	KTM	1:54:00	10:47	2	(France) Richard Sainct	KTM	31:09:08	10:06
12	3	(Spain) Nani Roma	KTM	1:54:38	11:25	3	(South Africa) Alfie Cox	KTM	33:29:06	28:53
13	1	(France) David Frétigné	Yamaha	6:10:25		1	(Spain) Nani Roma	KTM	39:17:00	
13	2	(France) Richard Sainct	KTM	6:14:06	3:41	2	(France) Richard Sainct	KTM	39:24:25	7:25
13	3	(Spain) Nani Roma	KTM	6:16:47	6:22	3	(France) Cyril Despres	KTM	40:02:39	45:39
14	1	(France) Cyril Despres	KTM	6:55:10		1	(Spain) Nani Roma	KTM	46:16:24	
14	2	(South Africa) Alfie Cox	KTM	6:56:33	1:23	2	(France) Richard Sainct	KTM	46:26:04	9:40
14	3	(Spain) Nani Roma	KTM	6:59:24	4:14	3	(France) Cyril Despres	KTM	46:57:49	41:25
15	1	(Italy) Fabrizio Meoni	KTM	6:55:46		1	(Spain) Nani Roma	KTM	53:15:29	
15	2	(France) Richard Sainct	KTM	6:56:32	0:46	2	(France) Richard Sainct	KTM	53:22:36	7:07
15	3	(Spain) Nani Roma	KTM	6:59:05	3:19	3	(France) Cyril Despres	KTM	54:01:58	46:29
16	1	(France) Richard Sainct	KTM	2:21:48		1	(Spain) Nani Roma	KTM	55:39:22	
16	2	(Spain) Nani Roma	KTM	2:23:53	2:05	2	(France) Richard Sainct	KTM	55:44:24	5:02
16	3	(France) Cyril Despres	KTM	2:24:12	2:24	3	(France) Cyril Despres	KTM	56:26:10	46:48
17	1	(France) Cyril Despres	KTM	14:49		1	(Spain) Nani Roma	KTM	55:56:28	
17	2	(Norway) Pål Anders Ullevålseter	KTM	14:59	0:10	2	(France) Richard Sainct	KTM	56:09:06	12:38
17	3	(Sweden) Per-Gunnar Lundmark	KTM	15:36	0:47	3	(France) Cyril Despres	KTM	56:40:59	44:31

=== Cars ===
	Stage result					General classification				
Stage	Pos	Competitor	Make	Time	Gap	Pos	Competitor	Make	Time	Gap
1	1	(Japan) Kenjiro Shinozuka (France) Arnaud Debron	Nissan	1:41		Stage not counted towards overall classification				
1	2	(South Africa) Giniel de Villiers (South Africa) François Jordaan	Nissan	1:42	0:01	Stage not counted towards overall classification				
1	3	(Italy) Miki Biasion (Italy) Tiziano Siviero	Mitsubishi	1:42	0:01	Stage not counted towards overall classification				
2	1	(Spain) José Maria Servia (France) François Borsotto	Schlesser-Ford	25:00		1	(Spain) José Maria Servia (France) François Borsotto	Schlesser-Ford	25:00	
2	2	(France) Stéphane Peterhansel (France) Jean-Paul Cottret	Mitsubishi	25:03	0:03	2	(France) Stéphane Peterhansel (France) Jean-Paul Cottret	Mitsubishi	25:03	0:03
2	3	(Belgium) Grégoire De Mévius (France) Alain Guehennec	BMW	25:26	0:26	3	(Belgium) Grégoire De Mévius (France) Alain Guehennec	BMW	25:26	0:26
3	1	(South Africa) Giniel de Villiers (South Africa) François Jordaan	Nissan	6:22		1	(France) Stéphane Peterhansel (France) Jean-Paul Cottret	Mitsubishi	31:30	
3	2	(Belgium) Grégoire De Mévius (France) Alain Guehennec	BMW	6:26	0:04	2	(Spain) José Maria Servia (France) François Borsotto	Schlesser-Ford	31:35	0:05
3	3	(France) Stéphane Peterhansel (France) Jean-Paul Cottret	Mitsubishi	6:27	0:27	3	(Belgium) Grégoire De Mévius (France) Alain Guehennec	BMW	31:52	0:22
4	1	(Finland) Ari Vatanen (Finland) Juha Repo	Nissan	40:50		1	(France) Stéphane Peterhansel (France) Jean-Paul Cottret	Mitsubishi	1:12:20	
4	2	(France) Stéphane Peterhansel (France) Jean-Paul Cottret	Mitsubishi	40:50	0:10	2	(Italy) Miki Biasion (Italy) Tiziano Siviero	Mitsubishi	1:13:27	1:07
4	3	(Italy) Miki Biasion (Italy) Tiziano Siviero	Mitsubishi	41:13	0:33	3	(Belgium) Grégoire De Mévius (France) Alain Guehennec	BMW	1:13:48	1:28
5	1	(France) Stéphane Peterhansel (France) Jean-Paul Cottret	Mitsubishi	3:14:11		1	(France) Stéphane Peterhansel (France) Jean-Paul Cottret	Mitsubishi	4:31:31^{1}	
5	2	(Japan) Hiroshi Masuoka (France) Gilles Picard	Mitsubishi	3:18:46	4:35	2	(Japan) Hiroshi Masuoka (France) Gilles Picard	Mitsubishi	4:32:43	1:12
5	3	(South Africa) Giniel de Villiers (South Africa) François Jordaan	Nissan	3:27:06	12:55	3	(France) Luc Alphand (Andorra) Henri Magne	BMW	4:42:28	10:57
6	1	(Japan) Hiroshi Masuoka (France) Gilles Picard	Mitsubishi	3:09:40		1	(Japan) Hiroshi Masuoka (France) Gilles Picard	Mitsubishi	7:42:23	
6	2	(South Africa) Giniel de Villiers (South Africa) François Jordaan	Nissan	3:12:37	2:57	2	(France) Stéphane Peterhansel (France) Jean-Paul Cottret	Mitsubishi	7:49:03	6:40
6	3	(United Kingdom) Colin McRae (Sweden) Tina Thörner	Nissan	3:15:21	5:41	3	(South Africa) Giniel de Villiers (South Africa) François Jordaan	Nissan	8:00:13	17:50
7	1	(Japan) Hiroshi Masuoka (France) Gilles Picard	Mitsubishi	5:58:35		1	(Japan) Hiroshi Masuoka (France) Gilles Picard	Mitsubishi	13:40:58	
7	2	(France) Stéphane Peterhansel (France) Jean-Paul Cottret	Mitsubishi	6:03:37	5:02	2	(France) Stéphane Peterhansel (France) Jean-Paul Cottret	Mitsubishi	13:52:40	11:42
7	3	(France) Jean-Louis Schlesser (Belgium) Jean-Marie Lurquin	Schlesser-Ford	6:19:33	20:58	3	(United Kingdom) Colin McRae (Sweden) Tina Thörner	Nissan	14:22:27	41:29
8	1	(France) Stéphane Peterhansel (France) Jean-Paul Cottret	Mitsubishi	5:01:25		1	(France) Stéphane Peterhansel (France) Jean-Paul Cottret	Mitsubishi	18:54:05	
8	2	(Germany) Jutta Kleinschmidt (Italy) Fabrizia Pons	Volkswagen	5:30:20	28:55	2	(Belgium) Grégoire De Mévius (France) Alain Guehennec	BMW	19:59:16	1:04:38
8	3	(Belgium) Grégoire De Mévius (France) Alain Guehennec	BMW	5:33:46	32:21	3	(Japan) Hiroshi Masuoka (France) Gilles Picard	Mitsubishi	20:16:37	1:22:32
9	1	(Japan) Hiroshi Masuoka (France) Gilles Picard	Mitsubishi	9:03:43		1	(France) Stéphane Peterhansel (France) Jean-Paul Cottret	Mitsubishi	28:16:20	
9	2	(France) Stéphane Peterhansel (France) Jean-Paul Cottret	Mitsubishi	9:22:15	18:32	2	(Japan) Hiroshi Masuoka (France) Gilles Picard	Mitsubishi	29:20:20	1:04:00
9	3	(Germany) Jutta Kleinschmidt (Italy) Fabrizia Pons	Volkswagen	9:48:50	45:07	3	(France) Jean-Louis Schlesser (Belgium) Jean-Marie Lurquin	Schlesser-Ford	30:38:48	2:22:28
10	Stages cancelled due to security concerns									
11	Stages cancelled due to security concerns									
12	1	(France) Luc Alphand (Andorra) Henri Magne	BMW	1:54:53		1	(France) Stéphane Peterhansel (France) Jean-Paul Cottret	Mitsubishi	30:16:53	
12	2	(France) Jean-Louis Schlesser (Belgium) Jean-Marie Lurquin	Schlesser-Ford	1:56:21	1:28	2	(Japan) Hiroshi Masuoka (France) Gilles Picard	Mitsubishi	31:21:36	1:04:43
12	3	(France) Stéphane Peterhansel (France) Jean-Paul Cottret	Mitsubishi	2:00:33	5:40	3	(France) Jean-Louis Schlesser (Belgium) Jean-Marie Lurquin	Schlesser-Ford	32:35:09	2:18:16
13	1	(United Kingdom) Colin McRae (Sweden) Tina Thörner	Nissan	5:52:58		1	(France) Stéphane Peterhansel (France) Jean-Paul Cottret	Mitsubishi	36:36:26	
13	2	(South Africa) Giniel de Villiers (South Africa) François Jordaan	Nissan	6:00:38	7:40	2	(Japan) Hiroshi Masuoka (France) Gilles Picard	Mitsubishi	37:38:55	1:02:29
13	3	(Finland) Ari Vatanen (Finland) Juha Repo	Nissan	6:01:45	8:47	3	(France) Jean-Louis Schlesser (Belgium) Jean-Marie Lurquin	Schlesser-Ford	39:06:25	2:29:59
14	1	(France) Luc Alphand (Andorra) Henri Magne	BMW	6:51:07		1	(France) Stéphane Peterhansel (France) Jean-Paul Cottret	Mitsubishi	43:46:03	
14	2	(United Kingdom) Colin McRae (Sweden) Tina Thörner	Nissan	7:05:27	14:20	2	(Japan) Hiroshi Masuoka (France) Gilles Picard	Mitsubishi	44:51:07	1:05:04
14	3	(France) Stéphane Peterhansel (France) Jean-Paul Cottret	Mitsubishi	7:09:37	18:30	3	(France) Jean-Louis Schlesser (Belgium) Jean-Marie Lurquin	Schlesser-Ford	46:17:47	2:31:44
15	1	(Japan) Hiroshi Masuoka (France) Gilles Picard	Mitsubishi	6:52:35		1	(France) Stéphane Peterhansel (France) Jean-Paul Cottret	Mitsubishi	50:47:49	
15	2	(United Kingdom) Colin McRae (Sweden) Tina Thörner	Nissan	7:05:27	14:20	2	(Japan) Hiroshi Masuoka (France) Gilles Picard	Mitsubishi	51:43:42	55:53
15	3	(South Africa) Giniel de Villiers (South Africa) François Jordaan	Nissan	7:10:07	17:32	3	(France) Jean-Louis Schlesser (Belgium) Jean-Marie Lurquin	Schlesser-Ford	53:43:05	2:55:16
16	1	(Germany) Jutta Kleinschmidt (Italy) Fabrizia Pons	Volkswagen	2:34:49		1	(France) Stéphane Peterhansel (France) Jean-Paul Cottret	Mitsubishi	53:28:32	
16	2	(France) Luc Alphand (Andorra) Henri Magne	BMW	2:35:48	0:59	2	(Japan) Hiroshi Masuoka (France) Gilles Picard	Mitsubishi	54:19:55	51:23
16	3	(Japan) Hiroshi Masuoka (France) Gilles Picard	Mitsubishi	2:36:13	1:24	3	(France) Jean-Louis Schlesser (Belgium) Jean-Marie Lurquin	Schlesser-Ford	56:32:19	3:03:47
17	1	(United Kingdom) Colin McRae (Sweden) Tina Thörner	Nissan	14:42		1	(France) Stéphane Peterhansel (France) Jean-Paul Cottret	Mitsubishi	53:47:37	
17	2	(Spain) José Maria Servia (France) François Borsotto	Schlesser-Ford	15:23	0:41	2	(Japan) Hiroshi Masuoka (France) Gilles Picard	Mitsubishi	54:37:01	49:24
17	3	(Qatar) Nasser Al-Attiyah (Belgium) Marc Bartholome	Mitsubishi	15:25	0:43	3	(France) Jean-Louis Schlesser (Belgium) Jean-Marie Lurquin	Schlesser-Ford	56:48:10	3:00:33

Note:

- ^1 — Peterhansel was awarded a five-minute penalty for receiving illegal outside assistance. This only affected the overall classification, with Peterhansel retaining his stage win.

=== Trucks ===
	Stage result					General classification				
Stage	Pos	Competitor	Make	Time	Gap	Pos	Competitor	Make	Time	Gap
1	1	(Russia) Vladimir Chagin (Russia) Semen Yakubov (Russia) Sergey Savostin	Kamaz	2:32		Stage not counted towards overall classification				
1	2	(Netherlands) Jan de Rooy (Belgium) Dany Colebunders (Belgium) Hugo Duisters	DAF	2:33	0:01	Stage not counted towards overall classification				
1	3	(Netherlands) Hans Bekx (Netherlands) Paul Flipsen (Netherlands) Pierre Blom	DAF	2:38	0:06	Stage not counted towards overall classification				
2	Stage cancelled due to hazardous conditions^{1}									
3	1	(Netherlands) Gérard de Rooy (Belgium) Tom Colsoul (Netherlands) Arno Slaats	DAF	7:32		1	(Netherlands) Gérard de Rooy (Belgium) Tom Colsoul (Netherlands) Arno Slaats	DAF	41:53	
3	2	(Netherlands) Jan de Rooy (Belgium) Dany Colebunders (Belgium) Hugo Duisters	DAF	7:39	0:07	2	(Netherlands) Jan de Rooy (Belgium) Dany Colebunders (Belgium) Hugo Duisters	DAF	42:00	0:07
3	3	(Russia) Vladimir Chagin (Russia) Semen Yakubov (Russia) Sergey Savostin	Kamaz	7:48	0:16	3	(Russia) Vladimir Chagin (Russia) Semen Yakubov (Russia) Sergey Savostin	Kamaz	42:09	0:16
4	1	(Russia) Firdaus Kabirov (Russia) Aydar Belyaev (Russia) Dzhamil Kamalov	Kamaz	49:54		1	(Netherlands) Gérard de Rooy (Belgium) Tom Colsoul (Netherlands) Arno Slaats	DAF	1:32:04	
4	2	(Netherlands) Gérard de Rooy (Belgium) Tom Colsoul (Netherlands) Arno Slaats	DAF	50:11	0:17	2	(Russia) Firdaus Kabirov (Russia) Aydar Belyaev (Russia) Dzhamil Kamalov	Kamaz	1:32:17	0:13
4	3	(Russia) Vladimir Chagin (Russia) Semen Yakubov (Russia) Sergey Savostin	Kamaz	51:32	1:38	3	(Russia) Vladimir Chagin (Russia) Semen Yakubov (Russia) Sergey Savostin	Kamaz	1:33:41	1:37
5	1	(Russia) Vladimir Chagin (Russia) Semen Yakubov (Russia) Sergey Savostin	Kamaz	4:00:27		1	(Russia) Vladimir Chagin (Russia) Semen Yakubov (Russia) Sergey Savostin	Kamaz	5:34:08	
5	2	(Netherlands) Gérard de Rooy (Belgium) Tom Colsoul (Netherlands) Arno Slaats	DAF	4:04:50	4:23	2	(Netherlands) Gérard de Rooy (Belgium) Tom Colsoul (Netherlands) Arno Slaats	DAF	5:36:54	2:46
5	3	(Brazil) André de Azevedo (Czech Republic) Tomáš Tomeček (Czech Republic) Jaromír Martinec	Tatra	4:13:28	13:01	3	(Brazil) André de Azevedo (Czech Republic) Tomáš Tomeček (Czech Republic) Jaromír Martinec	Tatra	5:50:51	16:43
6	1	(Russia) Vladimir Chagin (Russia) Semen Yakubov (Russia) Sergey Savostin	Kamaz	4:02:09		1	(Russia) Vladimir Chagin (Russia) Semen Yakubov (Russia) Sergey Savostin	Kamaz	9:36:17	
6	2	(Netherlands) Gérard de Rooy (Belgium) Tom Colsoul (Netherlands) Arno Slaats	DAF	4:05:37	3:28	2	(Netherlands) Gérard de Rooy (Belgium) Tom Colsoul (Netherlands) Arno Slaats	DAF	9:42:31	6:14
6	3	(Russia) Firdaus Kabirov (Russia) Aydar Belyaev (Russia) Dzhamil Kamalov	Kamaz	4:08:52	6:43	3	(Brazil) André de Azevedo (Czech Republic) Tomáš Tomeček (Czech Republic) Jaromír Martinec	Tatra	10:02:46	26:29
7	1	(Russia) Vladimir Chagin (Russia) Semen Yakubov (Russia) Sergey Savostin	Kamaz	7:29:53		1	(Russia) Vladimir Chagin (Russia) Semen Yakubov (Russia) Sergey Savostin	Kamaz	17:06:10	
7	2	(Brazil) André de Azevedo (Czech Republic) Tomáš Tomeček (Czech Republic) Jaromír Martinec	Tatra	7:43:45	13:52	2	(Netherlands) Gérard de Rooy (Belgium) Tom Colsoul (Netherlands) Arno Slaats	DAF	17:36:24	30:14
7	3	(Netherlands) Gérard de Rooy (Belgium) Tom Colsoul (Netherlands) Arno Slaats	DAF	7:53:53	24:00	3	(Brazil) André de Azevedo (Czech Republic) Tomáš Tomeček (Czech Republic) Jaromír Martinec	Tatra	17:46:31	40:21
8	1	(Czech Republic) Karel Loprais (Czech Republic) Petr Gilar (Czech Republic) Josef Kalina	Tatra	6:42:32		1	(Russia) Vladimir Chagin (Russia) Semen Yakubov (Russia) Sergey Savostin	Kamaz	23:51:36	
8	2	(Russia) Vladimir Chagin (Russia) Semen Yakubov (Russia) Sergey Savostin	Kamaz	6:45:26	2:54	2	(Brazil) André de Azevedo (Czech Republic) Tomáš Tomeček (Czech Republic) Jaromír Martinec	Tatra	24:35:06	43:30
8	3	(Brazil) André de Azevedo (Czech Republic) Tomáš Tomeček (Czech Republic) Jaromír Martinec	Tatra	6:48:35	6:03	3	(Czech Republic) Karel Loprais (Czech Republic) Petr Gilar (Czech Republic) Josef Kalina	Tatra	25:35:18	1:43:42
9	1	(Russia) Firdaus Kabirov (Russia) Aydar Belyaev (Russia) Dzhamil Kamalov	Kamaz	12:01:38		1	(Russia) Vladimir Chagin (Russia) Semen Yakubov (Russia) Sergey Savostin	Kamaz	35:57:20	
9	2	(Russia) Vladimir Chagin (Russia) Semen Yakubov (Russia) Sergey Savostin	Kamaz	12:05:44	4:06	2	(Brazil) André de Azevedo (Czech Republic) Tomáš Tomeček (Czech Republic) Jaromír Martinec	Tatra	36:56:01	58:41
9	3	(Netherlands) Gérard de Rooy (Belgium) Tom Colsoul (Netherlands) Arno Slaats	DAF	12:06:55	5:17	3	(Netherlands) Gérard de Rooy (Belgium) Tom Colsoul (Netherlands) Arno Slaats	DAF	37:50:30	1:53:10
10	Stages cancelled due to security concerns									
11	Stages cancelled due to security concerns									
12	1	(Russia) Firdaus Kabirov (Russia) Aydar Belyaev (Russia) Dzhamil Kamalov	Kamaz	2:24:37		1	(Russia) Vladimir Chagin (Russia) Semen Yakubov (Russia) Sergey Savostin	Kamaz	38:28:34	
12	2	(Brazil) André de Azevedo (Czech Republic) Tomáš Tomeček (Czech Republic) Jaromír Martinec	Tatra	2:26:57	2:20	2	(Brazil) André de Azevedo (Czech Republic) Tomáš Tomeček (Czech Republic) Jaromír Martinec	Tatra	39:22:58	54:24
12	3	(Netherlands) Gérard de Rooy (Belgium) Tom Colsoul (Netherlands) Arno Slaats	DAF	2:29:25	4:48	3	(Russia) Firdaus Kabirov (Russia) Aydar Belyaev (Russia) Dzhamil Kamalov	Kamaz	40:17:54	1:49:20
13	1	(Czech Republic) Karel Loprais (Czech Republic) Petr Gilar (Czech Republic) Josef Kalina	Tatra	7:39:43		1	(Russia) Vladimir Chagin (Russia) Semen Yakubov (Russia) Sergey Savostin	Kamaz	46:23:09	
13	2	(Brazil) André de Azevedo (Czech Republic) Tomáš Tomeček (Czech Republic) Jaromír Martinec	Tatra	7:44:39	4:56	2	(Brazil) André de Azevedo (Czech Republic) Tomáš Tomeček (Czech Republic) Jaromír Martinec	Tatra	47:07:37	44:28
13	3	(Russia) Ilgizar Mardeev (Russia) Sergey Girya (Russia) Eduard Kupriyanov	Kamaz	7:52:13	12:30	3	(Czech Republic) Karel Loprais (Czech Republic) Petr Gilar (Czech Republic) Josef Kalina	Tatra	48:10:51	1:47:42
14	1	(Russia) Firdaus Kabirov (Russia) Aydar Belyaev (Russia) Dzhamil Kamalov	Kamaz	8:57:36		1	(Russia) Vladimir Chagin (Russia) Semen Yakubov (Russia) Sergey Savostin	Kamaz	55:52:29	
14	2	(Netherlands) Gérard de Rooy (Belgium) Tom Colsoul (Netherlands) Arno Slaats	DAF	8:58:47	1:11	2	(Brazil) André de Azevedo (Czech Republic) Tomáš Tomeček (Czech Republic) Jaromír Martinec	Tatra	56:58:50	1:06:21
14	3	(Russia) Vladimir Chagin (Russia) Semen Yakubov (Russia) Sergey Savostin	Kamaz	9:29:20	31:44	3	(Russia) Firdaus Kabirov (Russia) Aydar Belyaev (Russia) Dzhamil Kamalov	Kamaz	57:23:39	1:31:10
15	1	(Russia) Firdaus Kabirov (Russia) Aydar Belyaev (Russia) Dzhamil Kamalov	Kamaz	8:19:33		1	(Russia) Vladimir Chagin (Russia) Semen Yakubov (Russia) Sergey Savostin	Kamaz	64:40:18	
15	2	(Netherlands) Gérard de Rooy (Belgium) Tom Colsoul (Netherlands) Arno Slaats	DAF	8:22:34	3:01	2	(Russia) Firdaus Kabirov (Russia) Aydar Belyaev (Russia) Dzhamil Kamalov	Kamaz	65:43:12	1:02:54
15	3	(Russia) Vladimir Chagin (Russia) Semen Yakubov (Russia) Sergey Savostin	Kamaz	8:47:49	28:16	3	(Netherlands) Gérard de Rooy (Belgium) Tom Colsoul (Netherlands) Arno Slaats	DAF	66:09:57	1:29:39
16	1	(Russia) Firdaus Kabirov (Russia) Aydar Belyaev (Russia) Dzhamil Kamalov	Kamaz	3:01:13		1	(Russia) Vladimir Chagin (Russia) Semen Yakubov (Russia) Sergey Savostin	Kamaz	67:49:45	
16	2	(Russia) Vladimir Chagin (Russia) Semen Yakubov (Russia) Sergey Savostin	Kamaz	3:09:27	8:14	2	(Russia) Firdaus Kabirov (Russia) Aydar Belyaev (Russia) Dzhamil Kamalov	Kamaz	68:44:25	54:40
16	3	(Netherlands) Gérard de Rooy (Belgium) Tom Colsoul (Netherlands) Arno Slaats	DAF	3:10:56	9:43	3	(Netherlands) Gérard de Rooy (Belgium) Tom Colsoul (Netherlands) Arno Slaats	DAF	69:20:53	1:31:08
17	1	(Netherlands) Hans Stacey (Netherlands) Toon van Genugten (Belgium) Eddy Chevaillier	DAF	18:51		1	(Russia) Vladimir Chagin (Russia) Semen Yakubov (Russia) Sergey Savostin	Kamaz	68:13:49	
17	2	(Netherlands) Hans Bekx (Netherlands) Paul Flipsen (Netherlands) Pierre Blom	DAF	19:28	0:37	2	(Russia) Firdaus Kabirov (Russia) Aydar Belyaev (Russia) Dzhamil Kamalov	Kamaz	69:07:27	53:38
17	3	(Brazil) André de Azevedo (Czech Republic) Tomáš Tomeček (Czech Republic) Jaromír Martinec	Tatra	20:09	1:18	3	(Netherlands) Gérard de Rooy (Belgium) Tom Colsoul (Netherlands) Arno Slaats	DAF	69:42:17	1:28:28

- ^1 - As the stage was cancelled, all competitors were awarded a stage time of 34:21.

== Final standings ==
=== Motorcycles ===
Pos	No.	Rider	Bike	Entrant	Time
1	4	(Spain) Nani Roma	KTM	Repsol KTM	55:56:28
2	1	(France) Richard Sainct	KTM	Gauloises KTM France	+12:38
3	2	(France) Cyril Despres	KTM	Gauloises KTM France	+44:31
4	10	(South Africa) Alfie Cox	KTM	Gauloises KTM International	+49:06
5	15	(Norway) Pål Anders Ullevålseter	KTM	Team Scandinavia	+2:04:33
6	3	(Italy) Fabrizio Meoni	KTM	Gauloises KTM International	+3:05:57
7	12	(France) David Frétigné	Yamaha	Yamaha Motor France	+3:26:54
8	8	(Chile) Carlo de Gavardo	KTM	KTM de Gavardo	+4:14:02
9	22	(France) François Flick	KTM	Allier Dynamique	+4:25:35
10	23	(Poland) Jacek Czachor	KTM	Orlen Team Moto	+5:31:56

=== Cars ===
Pos	No.	Driver	Co-Driver	Car	Entrant	Time
1	203	(France) Stéphane Peterhansel	(France) Jean-Paul Cottret	Mitsubishi	Mitsubishi Ralliart	53:47:37
2	201	(Japan) Hiroshi Masuoka	(France) Gilles Picard	Mitsubishi	Mitsubishi Ralliart	+49:24
3	200	(France) Jean-Louis Schlesser	(Belgium) Jean-Marie Lurquin	Schlesser-Ford	Schlesser-Ford Raid	+3:00:33
4	207	(France) Luc Alphand	(Andorra) Henri Magne	BMW	Team X-Raid	+3:55:58
5	211	(Germany) Andrea Mayer	(Germany) Andreas Schulz	Mitsubishi	Mitsubishi Ralliart	+5:46:17
6	224	(France) Bruno Saby	(United Kingdom) Matthew Stevenson	Volkswagen	Volkswagen Motorsport	+6:54:03
7	208	(South Africa) Giniel de Villiers	(South Africa) François Jordaan	Nissan	Nissan Rally Raid Team	+8:06:11
8	212	(Belgium) Grégoire De Mévius	(France) Alain Guehennec	BMW	Team X-Raid	+9:34:45
9	225	(France) Thierry Magnaldi	(France) Didier Le Gal	Honda	Thierry Magnaldi	+10:00:36
10	259	(Qatar) Nasser Al-Attiyah	(Belgium) Marc Bartholome	Mitsubishi	Ralliart	+10:01:28

=== Trucks ===
Pos	No.	Driver	Co-Drivers	Truck	Time
1	414	(Russia) Vladimir Chagin	(Russia) Semen Yakubov (Russia) Sergey Savostin	Kamaz	68:13:49
2	410	(Russia) Firdaus Kabirov	(Russia) Aydar Belyaev (Russia) Dzhamil Kamalov	Kamaz	+53:38
3	417	(Netherlands) Gérard de Rooy	(Belgium) Tom Colsoul (Netherlands) Arno Slaats	DAF	+1:28:28
4	423	(Russia) Ilgizar Mardeev	(Russia) Sergey Girya (Russia) Eduard Kupriyanov	Kamaz	+6:50:20
5	400	(Japan) Yoshimasa Sugawara	(Japan) Seiichi Suzuki (Japan) Teruhito Sugawara	Hino	+7:55:03
6	412	(Brazil) André de Azevedo	(Czech Republic) Tomáš Tomeček (Czech Republic) Jaromír Martinec	Tatra	+8:54:08
7	415	(Czech Republic) Karel Loprais	(Czech Republic) Petr Gilar (Czech Republic) Josef Kalina	Tatra 815	+10:17:03
8	416	(Netherlands) Hans Bekx	(Netherlands) Paul Flipsen (Netherlands) Pierre Blom	DAF	+10:22:52
9	442	(Netherlands) Hans Stacey	(Netherlands) Toon van Genugten (Belgium) Eddy Chevaillier	DAF	+12:08:28
10	457	(Austria) Peter Reif	(Austria) Gunter Pichlbauer	MAN	+17:27:33
