= Grégoire De Mévius =

Belgian rally driver (born 1962)

Grégoire de Mevius
Personal information
- Nationality: Belgian
- Full name: Gregoire Gaston Marie Ghislain de Mevius
- Born: 16 August 1962 (age 64)

World Rally Championship record
- Years active: 1988–2001
- Co-driver: (Belgium) Luc Manset (Belgium) Willy Lux (Kenya) Abdul Sidi (Sweden) Arne Hertz (France) Hervé Sauvage (Belgium) Jean-Marc Fortin (France) Jack Boyère
- Teams: Subaru, Ford, Mazda, Nissan
- Rallies: 48
- Championships: 0
- Rally wins: 0
- Podiums: 0
- Stage wins: n/a
- Total points: 8
- First rally: 1988 1000 Lakes Rally
- Last rally: 2001 Network Q Rally of Great Britain

Baron Gregoire Gaston Marie Ghislain de Mevius (born 16 August 1962) is a Belgian rally driver active in the years 1988–2001. He first broke out into the World Rally Championship scene racing in the Group N category in the Mazda 323. With an unsuccessful spell of Group A races in 1990, he was never considered to be a talent in spotlight of rally stardom. However, in 1993 he finally managed to secure a place as a privateer in the Group A WRC category. Although he never challenged for the title effectively, he made some good efforts scoring within the top-six in several gravel rallies. His best result was in the 1998 Network Q Rally of Great Britain where he secured a fourth place in the Privateer Belgacom Turbo Team' Subaru Impreza.

After his retirement from the WRC, De Mévius moved to Rally Raid events such as the Paris-Dakar Rally where he often competed with the manufacturer Nissan team and for BMW X-Raid. During the 2000 Paris–Dakar–Cairo Rally for Nissan, he was involved in a freak accident, involving four cars running near the top of the field - all arrived at a collapsed dune at the same time, with several competitors, including De Mévius, injuring their backs.

In the 2003 Dakar, De Mévius was in third place with the BMW, until an impact with a rock damaged the steering. In the 2004 Dakar Rally, again with BMW and again on the podium in the early running, a significant engine issue plus a roll meant an eighth-placed finish. In 2005, he was back to the Nissan France team, running an older-spec pick-up on the event. Sadly, a significant crash led to retirement and an air-lift to hospital.

His sons, Ghislain De Mévius and Guillaume De Mévius, are also rally drivers.
