= 2008 Central Europe Rally =

Motorsport event in Romania and Hungary

← Previous event	Next event →
- Host country: Hungary; Romania
- Stages: 7 (1,092 km; 679 mi)
- Overall distance: 2,671 km (1,660 mi)

Results
- Cars winner: (Spain) Carlos Sainz and (France) Michel Périn; Volkswagen Race Touareg 2
- Bikes winner: (France) David Casteu; KTM
- Trucks winner: (Netherlands) Hans Stacey, (Belgium) Eddy Chevaillier, (Netherlands) Bernard der Kinderen; MAN

The 2008 Central Europe Rally was a rally raid endurance race held in Romania and Hungary that legally served as the 30th running of the Dakar Rally.

The Amaury Sport Organisation, which organises the Dakar Rally, created this event as a temporary event after the 2007 killing of French tourists in Mauritania less than two weeks before the originally scheduled start of the Dakar Rally. All Dakar entries were deferred to this event, and for logistical and legal reasons by the ASO's moves, allowed this event to serve as the 30th running of the Dakar Rally.

In the Cars category, Carlos Sainz Sr. won the rally by 2:01 over Stéphane Peterhansel.

In the Trucks division, Hans Stacey was the rally winner.

In the Bikes division, David Casteu was the rally winner.

== Route ==
The event began in Budapest on April 19 and finished at Lake Balaton in Hungary on April 26, 2008.

Below is a table with the locations of the start and finish points of each stage of the Rally, as well as each stage's distance.

Date	Stage	Start	Finish	Special Stage (km)	Road Section (km)	Total (km)	Stage winners			
Date	Stage	Start	Finish	Special Stage (km)	Road Section (km)	Total (km)	Bikes	Quads	Cars	Trucks
20 April	1	(Hungary) Budapest	(Romania) Baia Mare	63	468	531	(Spain) M. Coma	(Hungary) L. Szabo	(Spain) C. Sainz	(Netherlands) H. Stacey
21 April	2	(Romania) Baia Mare	(Romania) Baia Mare	152	140	292	(France) D. Casteu	(Romania) R. Irimescu	(France) S. Peterhansel	(Netherlands) H. Stacey
22 April	3	(Romania) Baia Mare	(Hungary) Debrecen	152	285	437	(Slovakia) J. Katriňák	(Romania) R. Irimescu	(South Africa) G. de Villiers	(Czech Republic) A. Loprais
23 April	4	(Hungary) Debrecen	(Hungary) Veszprém	150	430	580	(France) C. Despres	(France) H. Deltrieu	(Spain) C. Sainz	(Netherlands) H. Stacey
24 April	5	(Hungary) Veszprém	(Hungary) Veszprém	210	107	317	(France) D. Casteu	(Hungary) N. Nemeth	(Spain) C. Sainz	(Netherlands) H. Stacey
25 April	6	(Hungary) Veszprém	(Hungary) Veszprém	210	107	317	(France) C. Despres	(France) H. Deltrieu	(Spain) C. Sainz	(Netherlands) H. Stacey
26 April	7	(Hungary) Veszprém	(Hungary) Balatonfüred	155	42	197	(Slovakia) J. Katriňák	(France) C. Declerck	(Spain) C. Sainz	(Netherlands) H. Stacey
Total (km)				1,092	1,579	2,671				

== Results ==
=== Motorcycles ===
1. David Casteu (KTM) 12:21:14
2. Francisco López (KTM) +2:58
3. Alain Duclos (KTM) +19:39
4. José Manuel Pellicer (Yamaha) +21:20
5. Cyril Despres (KTM) +22:50

=== Cars ===
1. Carlos Sainz/Michel Périn, Volkswagen Race Touareg 2, 11h18m08s
2. Stéphane Peterhansel/Jean-Paul Cottret, Mitsubishi Pajero Evolution, + 2.01m
3. Dieter Depping/Timo Gottschalk, Volkswagen Race Touareg 2, + 6.34m
4. Luc Alphand/Gilles Picard, Mitsubishi Pajero Evolution, + 7.28m
5. Carlos Sousa/Andreas Schulz, Volkswagen Race Touareg 2, + 33.45m
6. Bruno Saby/Alain Guehennec, BMW X3 CC, + 46.30m
7. Robert Baldwin/Kevin Heath, Hummer H3, + 56.02m
8. Philippe Gache/François Flick, SMG, + 1h07m08s
9. Miroslav Zapletal/Valdimir Nemajer, Mitsubishi L200, + 1h12m19s
10. Robby Gordon/Andy Grider, Hummer H3, + 1h25m38s

=== Trucks ===
1. Hans Stacey, Eddy Chevaillier, Bernard der Kinderen, MAN TGA, 11:43:20
2. Wulfer van Ginkel, Daniël Bruinsma, Richard de Rooy, GINAF X2222, +0:33:43
3. Aleš Loprais, Ladislav Lála, Milan Holáň, Tatra T815-2, +0:53:18
4. Marek Spáčil, Jiří Žák, Zdeněk Němec, LIAZ 151154, +1:27:42
5. Marco Dono, Andrea Bettiga, Angelo Fumagalli, Iveco, +1:28:27
