= Jean-Paul Cottret =

French rally navigator (born 1963)

Jean-Paul Cottret (born June 19, 1963 in Gien) is a French rally navigator, best known for his seven success in the Dakar Rally alongside Stéphane Peterhansel.

== Biography ==
Cottret's partnership with Peterhansel began during the 1999 event, in which the pair placed seventh overall in the car category. Switching to the factory Mitsubishi team, the pair won the Dakar in 2004, 2005 and 2007 before adding a fourth success in 2012 at the wheel of an X-Raid prepared Mini.

In addition to their Dakar success, Cottret and Peterhansel have been successful in other minor rally raid events, such as the Abu Dhabi Desert Challenge, Spanish Baja and Rally Morocco.

== Achievements ==
=== Dakar Rally ===
Year	Car	Driver	Rank
1985	Mitsubishi Pajero	(France) Maurice Sartiaux	40th
1986	Mitsubishi Pajero	(France) Maurice Sartiaux	41st
1992	Mitsubishi Pajero	(France) Dominique Housieaux	63rd
1993	Proto	(France) Jérôme Riviere	37th
1994	Buggy Bourgoin	(France) Philippe Wambergue	3rd.
1995	Nissan	(France) Dominique Housieaux	14th
1996	Nissan	(France) Dominique Housieaux	20th
1997	Toyota Land Cruiser	(France) Philippe Wambergue	Rit.
1998	Toyota Land Cruiser	(France) Philippe Wambergue	Rit.
1999	Nissan	(France) Stéphane Peterhansel	7th
2000	Mega	(France) Stéphane Peterhansel	2nd
2003	Mitsubishi Pajero Evolution	(France) Stéphane Peterhansel	3rd
2004	Mitsubishi Pajero Evolution	(France) Stéphane Peterhansel	1st
2005	Mitsubishi Pajero Evolution	(France) Stéphane Peterhansel	1st
2006	Mitsubishi Pajero Evolution	(France) Stéphane Peterhansel	4th
2007	Mitsubishi Pajero Evolution	(France) Stéphane Peterhansel	1st
2009	Mitsubishi Pajero Evolution	(France) Stéphane Peterhansel	Rit.
2010	BMW X3	(France) Stéphane Peterhansel	4th
2011	BMW X3	(France) Stéphane Peterhansel	4th
2012	Mini All 4 Racing	(France) Stéphane Peterhansel	1st
2013	Mini All 4 Racing	(France) Stéphane Peterhansel	1st
2014	Mini All 4 Racing	(France) Stéphane Peterhansel	2nd
2015	Peugeot 2008 DKR	(France) Stéphane Peterhansel	11th
2016	Peugeot 2008 DKR	(France) Stéphane Peterhansel	1st
2017	Peugeot 3008 DKR	(France) Stéphane Peterhansel	1st
2018	Peugeot 3008 DKR	(France) Stéphane Peterhansel	4th
