= Firdaus Kabirov =

Russian rally racer

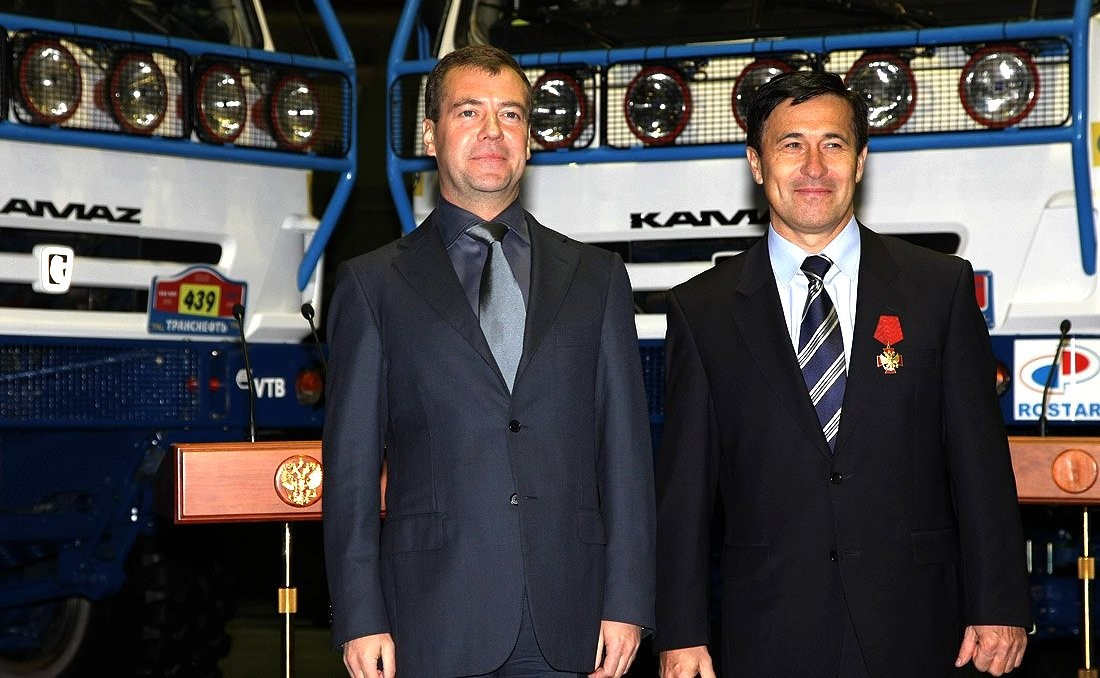
- Born: Firdaus Zaripovich Kabirov; 19 May 1961 (age 65) Naberezhnye Chelny, Tatar ASSR, RSFSR, Soviet Union
- Former teams: Kamaz Master

Firdaus Zaripovich Kabirov (Russian: Фирдаус Зарипович Кабиров; born 19 May 1961) is a retired Russian rally racer who twice won the Dakar Rally in the trucks category, competing for Kamaz.

In 2016, he was named Kamaz's Deputy Director for Development. In December 2021, he was appointed as chief executive officer of United Automotive Technologies, a holding of auto parts manufacturers controlled by Kamaz.

== Dakar Rally results ==
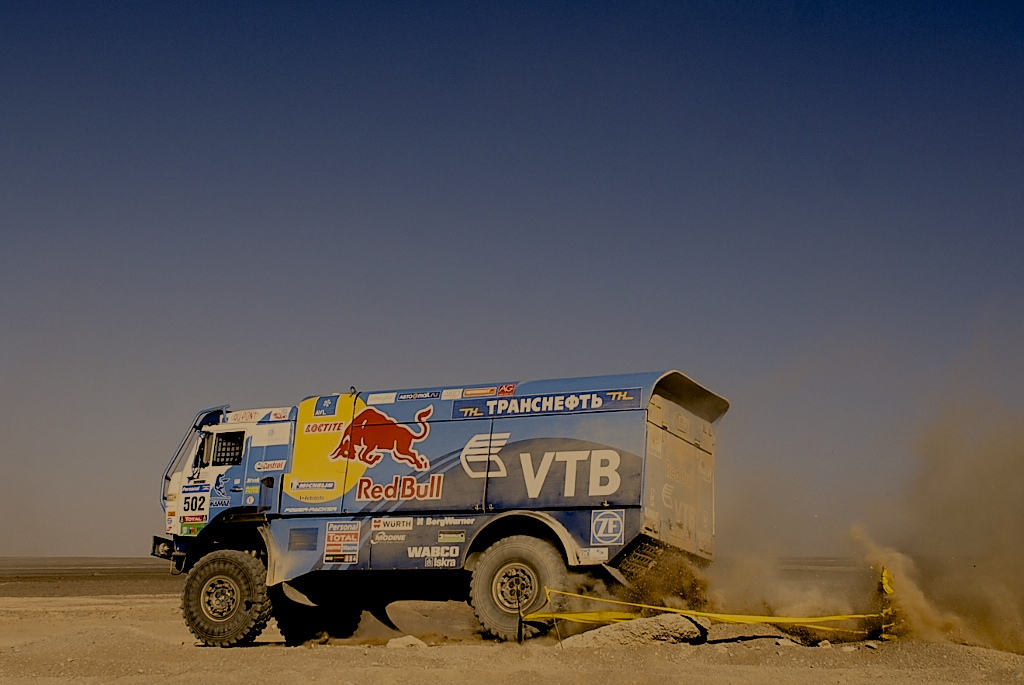
Kabirov and his Kamaz at the 2011 Dakar Rally

Year	Class	Vehicle	Position	Stages won
2000	Truck	Kamaz	3rd	5
2001	Truck	Kamaz	DNF	2
2002	Truck	Kamaz	DNP	–
2003	Truck	Kamaz	3rd	5
2004	Truck	Kamaz	2nd	6
2005	Truck	Kamaz	1st	2
2006	Truck	Kamaz	3rd	2
2007	Truck	Kamaz	DNP	–
2009	Truck	Kamaz	1st	4
2010	Truck	Kamaz	2nd	4
2011	Truck	Kamaz	2nd	4
