= KTM LC4 660R =

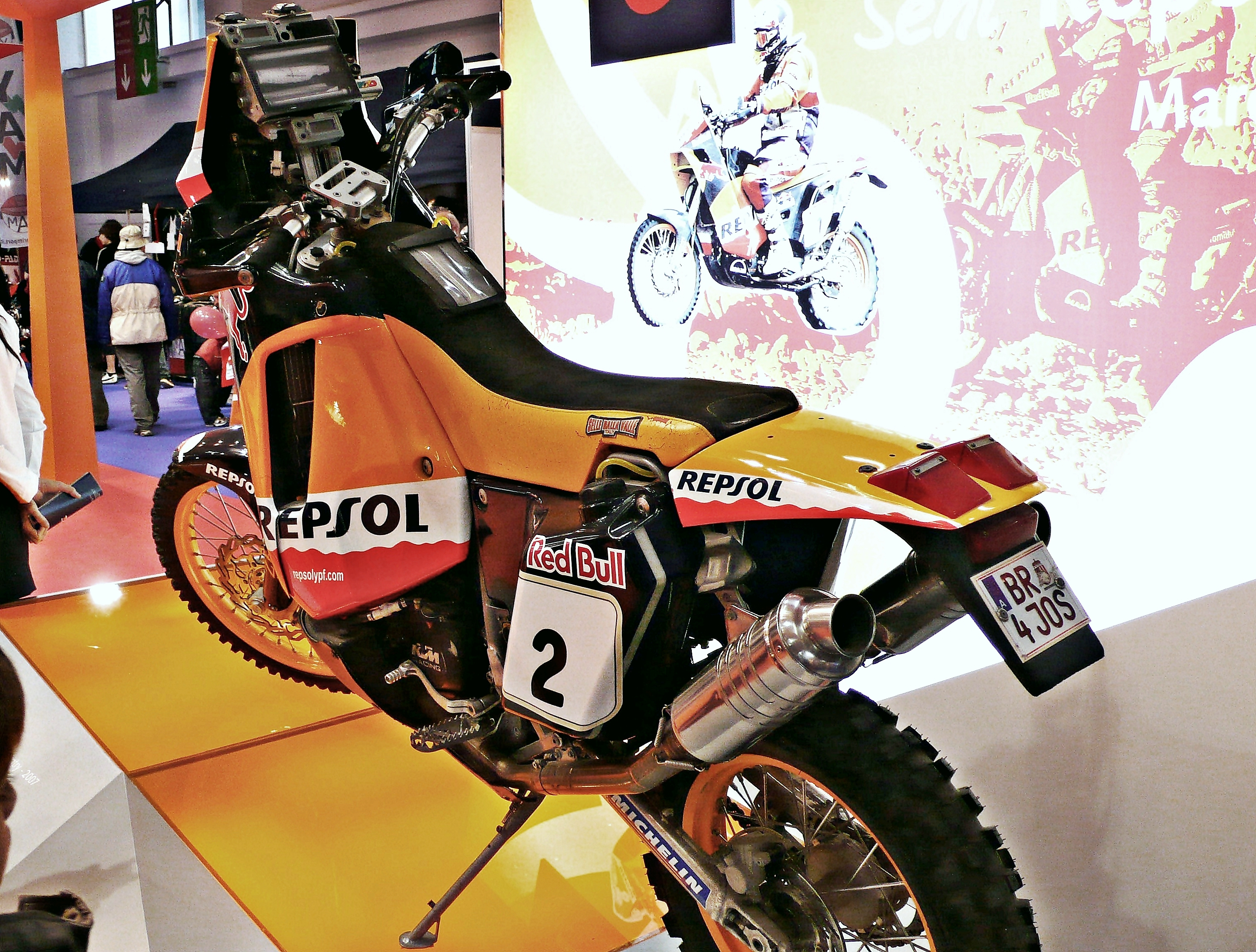
- KTM LC4 660R (Repsol team) who won 2006 Dakar Rally with Spanish biker Marc Coma
- Manufacturer: KTM
- Production: 2001-2006
- Assembly: Austria
- Predecessor: KTM LC4
- Successor: KTM 690 Rally

KTM LC4 660R is a rally raid bike, produced from 2001 to 2006 with the specific task of winning the Dakar Rally, that has won five times in six participations.

== Rally Dakar podium ==
Gold medal	Silver medal	Bronze medal
5	6	5

Year	1st		2nd		3rd	
Year	Driver	Bike	Driver	Bike	Driver	Bike
2001	(Italy) Fabrizio Meoni	LC4 660R	(Spain) Jordi Arcarons	LC4 660R	(Chile) Carlo de Gavardo	LC4 660R
2002			(South Africa) Alfie Cox	LC4 660R	(France) Richard Sainct	LC4 660R
2003	(France) Richard Sainct	LC4 660R	(France) Cyril Despres	LC4 660R		
2004	(Spain) Nani Roma	LC4 660R	(France) Richard Sainct	LC4 660R	(France) Cyril Despres	LC4 660R
2005	(France) Cyril Despres	LC4 660R	(Spain) Marc Coma	LC4 660R	(South Africa) Alfie Cox	LC4 660R
2006	(Spain) Marc Coma	LC4 660R	(France) Cyril Despres	LC4 660R	(Italy) Giovanni Sala	LC4 660R

== See also ==
- KTM 450 Rally
