= 2005 Dakar Rally =

Off-road motorsport event in Spain and Africa

← Previous event	Next event →
- Host country: Spain; Morocco / (Sahrawi Arab Democratic Republic) Western Sahara; Mauritania; Mali; Senegal

Results
- Cars winner: (France) Stéphane Peterhansel (France) Jean-Paul Cottret; Mitsubishi
- Bikes winner: (France) Cyril Despres; KTM
- Trucks winner: (Russia) Firdaus Kabirov (Russia) Aydar Belyaev (Russia) Andrey Mokeev; Kamaz

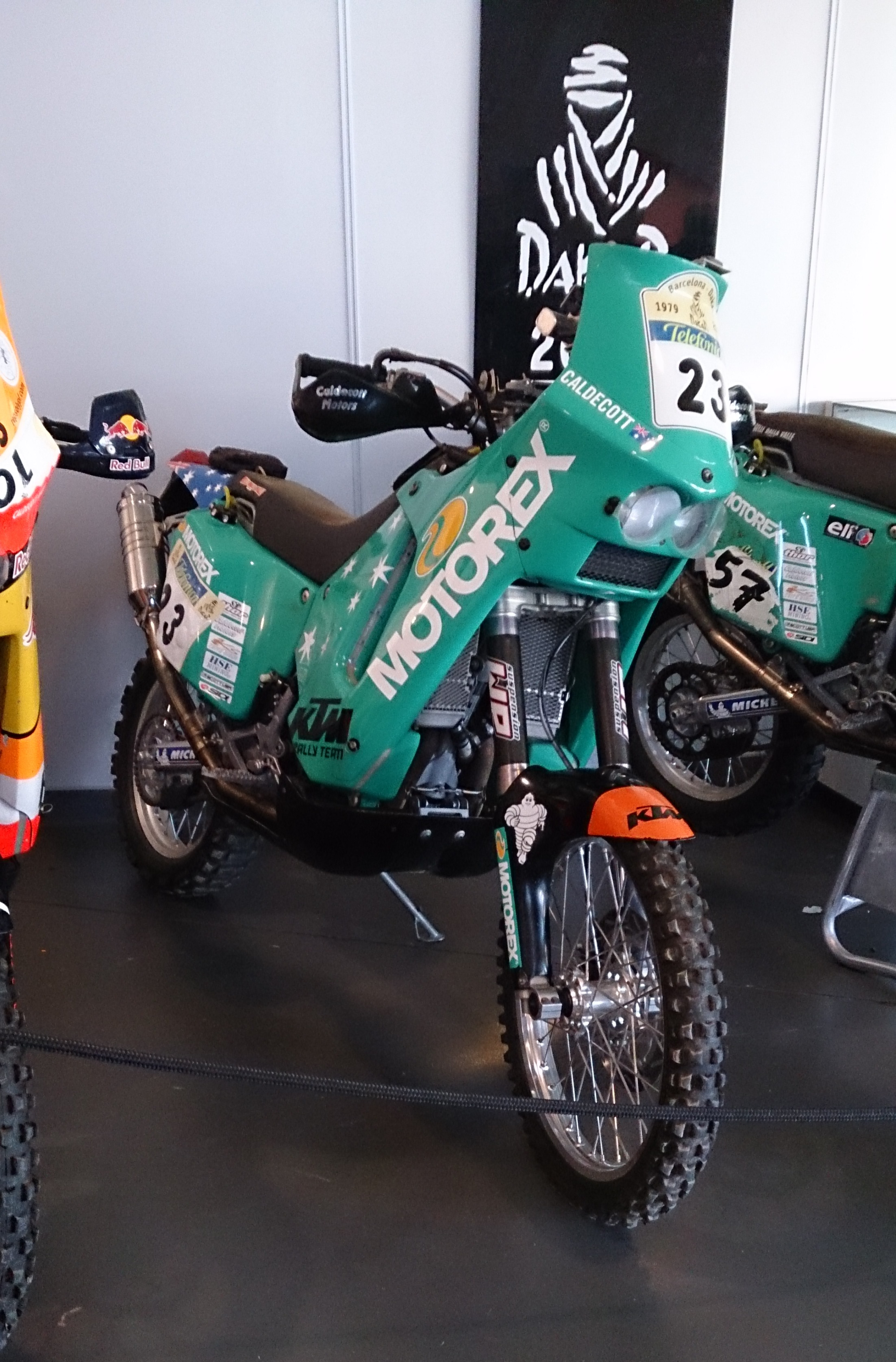
The KTM on which Andy Caldecott placed sixth in the 2005 Dakar Rally

2005 Dakar Rally also known as the 2005 Paris-Dakar Rally was the 27th running of the Dakar Rally event. The 2005 event was 5,565 miles (8,956 km) long, began in Barcelona on 31 December 2004 and passed through Morocco, Western Sahara, Mauritania and Mali before ending at Dakar in Senegal on 16 January 2005. The course was shorter than in 2004 but was more challenging. A record number of competitors, 696 cars, motorbikes and trucks (including assistance vehicles) in total, entered the rally.

This year introduced a regulation for motorcycles that allowed open class single cylinder motorcycles of any capacity but limited twin cylinder motorcycles to 450cc.

Robby Gordon and Colin McRae swapped the lead in the early stages of the rally, until McRae suffered a crash during the sixth stage between Smara and Zouerat and retired from the event. Stephane Peterhansel took the lead after winning the seventh stage. The eighth stage between Tichit and Tidjikja across the Mauritanian desert was cancelled due to stormy weather. Luc Alphand won the ninth stage although Peterhansel retained the overall lead. Peterhansel won the tenth stage around the town of Atar in Mauritania, and retained his lead after the twelfth stage. The motorcycle stage was cancelled as a mark of respect for Fabrizio Meoni, twice winner of the motorcycle category, who died following an accident on the 11th stage. Peterhansel also won the thirteenth stage from Bamako to Kayes in Mali. The 14th stage was won by Ari Vatanen, the 51st of his career, the 15th was won by Giniel de Villiers, and the final stage by Bruno Saby. The overall title was won by Stephane Peterhansel for the second successive year. The motorcycle category was won by Cyril Despres.

== Entries ==
Number of participants
Stage	Bikes	Cars	Trucks	Total
Start of Rally	230	164	69	463
End of Rally	104	75	36	215

=== Bikes ===
Leading Entries
Manufacturer	Team	No.	Rider
(Austria) KTM	Gauloises KTM	2	(France) Cyril Despres
(Austria) KTM	Gauloises KTM	3	(South Africa) Alfie Cox
(Austria) KTM	Gauloises KTM	4	(Italy) Fabrizio Meoni
(Austria) KTM	Gauloises KTM	9	(France) Jean Brucy
(Austria) KTM	Team Scandinavia	5	(Norway) Pål Anders Ullevålseter
(Austria) KTM	KTM Repsol-Red Bull	6	(Spain) Marc Coma
(Austria) KTM	KTM Repsol-Red Bull	7	(Spain) Isidre Esteve
(Austria) KTM	KTM Repsol-Red Bull	14	(Italy) Giovanni Sala
(Austria) KTM	KTM Repsol-Red Bull	16	(Spain) Jordi Durán
(Austria) KTM	De Gavardo	8	(Chile) Carlo de Gavardo
(Austria) KTM	Red Bull USA KTM	17	(United States) Scot Harden
(Austria) KTM	Red Bull USA KTM	21	(United States) Kellon Walch
(Austria) KTM	Red Bull USA KTM	22	(United States) Chris Blais
(Austria) KTM	KTM Team Australia	23	(Australia) Andy Caldecott
(Austria) KTM	Petrobras-Lubrax	25	(Brazil) Jean de Azevedo
(Austria) KTM	KTM-Toni-Togo	26	(France) Alain Duclos
(Japan) Yamaha	Yamaha France	12	(France) David Frétigné

Note: Number one was not issued as a mark of respect Richard Sainct, who was killed during the Rally of the Pharaohs in Egypt in September 2004. The reigning champion in the category, Nani Roma, switched to the car category for this year.

=== Cars ===
Leading Entries
Manufacturer	Team	No.	Driver	Co-Driver
(France) Schlesser	Schlesser-Ford Raid	300	(France) Jean-Louis Schlesser	(France) François Borsotto
(France) Schlesser	Schlesser-Ford Raid	301	(Spain) José Maria Servia	(France) Arnaud Debron
(France) SMG	SMG	302	(France) Philippe Gache	(France) Jean-Pierre Garcin
(Japan) Honda	Fast & Speed	305	(France) Thierry Magnaldi	(Belgium) Jean-Paul Forthomme
(Japan) Mitsubishi	Mitsubishi Ralliart	306	(France) Stéphane Peterhansel	(France) Jean-Paul Cottret
(Japan) Mitsubishi	Mitsubishi Ralliart	309	(Japan) Hiroshi Masuoka	(Germany) Andreas Schulz
(Japan) Mitsubishi	Mitsubishi Ralliart	312	(France) Luc Alphand	(France) Gilles Picard
(Japan) Mitsubishi	Mitsubishi Ralliart	316	(Germany) Andrea Mayer	(France) Jean-Michel Polato
(Japan) Mitsubishi	Mitsubishi Ralliart	320	(Spain) Nani Roma	(Andorra) Henri Magne
(Germany) Volkswagen	Volkswagen Motorsport	307	(France) Bruno Saby	(France) Michel Périn
(Germany) Volkswagen	Volkswagen Motorsport	310	(Germany) Jutta Kleinschmidt	(Italy) Fabrizia Pons
(Germany) Volkswagen	Volkswagen Motorsport	313	(Finland) Juha Kankkunen	(Finland) Juha Repo
(Germany) Volkswagen	Volkswagen Motorsport	317	(United States) Robby Gordon	(Germany) Dirk von Zitzewitz
(Japan) Nissan	Nissan Rally Raid Team	308	(United Kingdom) Colin McRae	(Sweden) Tina Thörner
(Japan) Nissan	Nissan Rally Raid Team	311	(Finland) Ari Vatanen	(Italy) Tiziano Siviero
(Japan) Nissan	Nissan Rally Raid Team	314	(South Africa) Giniel de Villiers	(Belgium) Jean-Marie Lurquin
(Japan) Nissan	Nissan Dessoude	315	(Portugal) Carlos Sousa	(France) Thierry Delli-Zotti
(Japan) Nissan	Nissan Dessoude	319	(Japan) Kenjiro Shinozuka	(France) Pascal Maimon
(Japan) Nissan	Nissan Dessoude	322	(Belgium) Grégoire de Mévius	(France) Jacky Dubois
(Germany) BMW	X-Raid	318	(Qatar) Nasser Al-Attiyah	(France) Alain Guehennec
(Germany) BMW	X-Raid	325	(Spain) José Luis Monterde	(Spain) Rafael Tornabell

=== Trucks ===
Leading Entries
Manufacturer	Team	No.	Driver	Co-Drivers
(Japan) Hino	Sugawara	500	(Japan) Yoshimasa Sugawara	(Japan) Katsumi Hamura
(Japan) Hino	Sugawara	501	(Japan) Teruhito Sugawara	(Japan) Seiichi Suzuki
(Germany) Mercedes-Benz	Vismara Sport System	503	(Italy) Giacomo Vismara	(Italy) Mario Cambiaghi (Italy) Claudio Bellina
(Russia) Kamaz	Kamaz-Master	515	(Russia) Vladimir Chagin	(Russia) Semen Yakubov (Russia) Sergey Savostin
(Russia) Kamaz	Kamaz-Master	520	(Russia) Firdaus Kabirov	(Russia) Aydar Belyaev (Russia) Andrey Mokeev
(Russia) Kamaz	Kamaz-Master	525	(Russia) Ilgizar Mardeev	(Russia) Stanislav Konopko (Russia) Vladimir Goloub
(Netherlands) DAF	Team De Rooy	516	(Netherlands) Gerard de Rooy	(Belgium) Tom Colsoul (Netherlands) Arno Slaats
(Netherlands) DAF	Team De Rooy	521	(Netherlands) Jan de Rooy	(Belgium) Dany Colebunders (Belgium) Clemens Smulders
(Netherlands) DAF	Team De Rooy	526	(Belgium) Hugo Duisters	(Belgium) Yvo Geusens (Morocco) Mohamed El Bouzidi
(Italy) Iveco	Motorsport Italia	517	(Italy) Miki Biasion	(Italy) Giorgio Albiero (Italy) Livio Diamante
(Italy) Iveco	Motorsport Italia	522	(Finland) Markku Alén	(Italy) Guido Toni (Italy) Adriano Micozzi
(Czech Republic) Tatra	Petrobras-Lubrax	518	(Brazil) André de Azevedo	(Czech Republic) Jaromír Martinec (Brazil) Luiz Antonio de Azevedo
(Czech Republic) Tatra	Loprais Tatra	519	(Czech Republic) Karel Loprais	(Czech Republic) Petr Gilar (Czech Republic) Josef Kalina
(Germany) MAN	Exact Software	555	(Netherlands) Hans Stacey	(Belgium) Eddy Chevallier (Netherlands) Johan van Gestel

== Stages ==
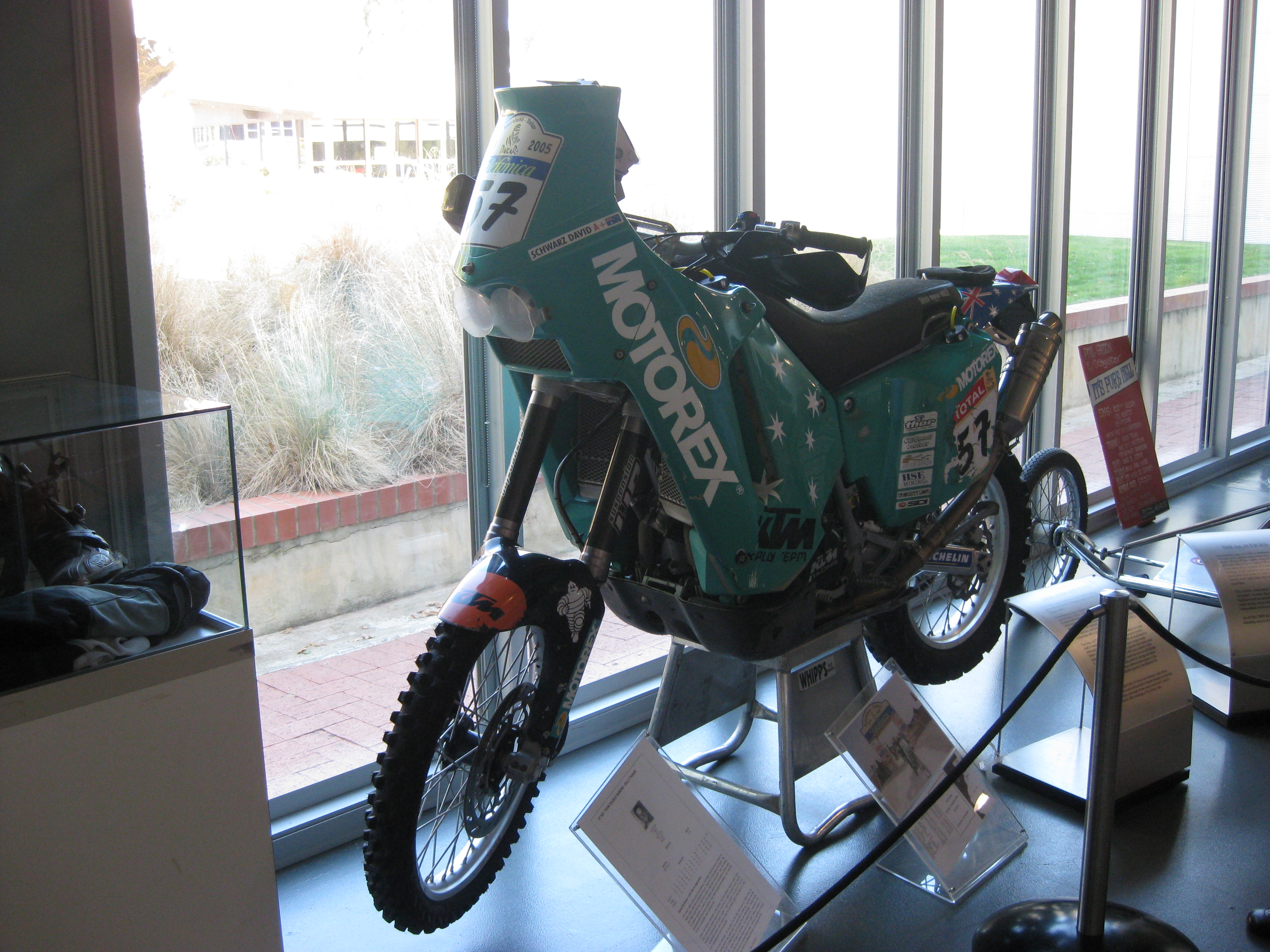
The KTM ridden by David Schwarz in the 2005 Dakar Rally

Stage	Date	From	To	Total (km)	Stage winners		
Stage	Date	From	To	Total (km)	Bikes	Cars	Trucks
1	31 December	(Spain) Barcelona		50	(France) D. Frétigné	(United States) R. Gordon	(Netherlands) H. Bekx
2	1 January	(Spain) Barcelona	(Spain) Granada	920	Liaison only		
3	2 January	(Spain) Granada	(Morocco) Rabat	573	(France) D. Frétigné	(United Kingdom) C. McRae	(Netherlands) H. Bekx
4	3 January	(Morocco) Rabat	(Morocco) Agadir	666	Stage cancelled^{1}	(United States) R. Gordon	(Russia) V. Chagin
5	4 January	(Morocco) Agadir	(Morocco) / (Sahrawi Arab Democratic Republic) Smara	654	(Australia) A. Caldecott	(United Kingdom) C. McRae	(Russia) V. Chagin
6	5 January	(Morocco) / (Sahrawi Arab Democratic Republic) Smara	(Mauritania) Zouérat	622	(Italy) F. Meoni	(France) S. Peterhansel	(Russia) V. Chagin
7	6 January	(Mauritania) Zouérat	(Mauritania) Tichit	669	(France) D. Frétigné	(France) S. Peterhansel	(Russia) F. Kabirov
8	7 January	(Mauritania) Tichit	(Mauritania) Tidjikja	Stage cancelled^{2}			
9	8 January	(Mauritania) Tidjikja	(Mauritania) Atar	399	(Spain) I. Esteve	(France) L. Alphand	(Russia) V. Chagin
	9 January	(Mauritania) Atar		Rest day			
10	10 January	(Mauritania) Atar		499	(France) C. Despres	(France) S. Peterhansel	(Russia) F. Kabirov
11	11 January	(Mauritania) Atar	(Mauritania) Kiffa	695	(Spain) M. Coma	(Germany) J. Kleinschmidt	(Netherlands) H. Bekx
12	12 January	(Mauritania) Kiffa	(Mali) Bamako	819	Stage cancelled^{3}	(South Africa) G. de Villiers	(Netherlands) G. de Rooy
13	13 January	(Mali) Bamako	(Mali) Kayes	668	(Australia) A. Caldecott	(France) S. Peterhansel	(Netherlands) G. de Rooy
14	14 January	(Mali) Kayes	(Senegal) Tambacounda	630	(Brazil) J. de Azevedo	(France) B. Saby^{4}	(Netherlands) G. de Rooy
15	15 January	(Senegal) Tambacounda	(Senegal) Dakar	569	(France) C. Despres	(South Africa) G. de Villiers	(Russia) V. Chagin
16	16 January	(Senegal) Dakar		68	(United States) K. Walch	(France) B. Saby	(Russia) V. Chagin

Notes:

- ^1 — Stage cancelled for bikes only due to adverse weather conditions.
- ^2 — Stage cancelled for all classes due to poor visibility.
- ^3 — Stage cancelled for bikes only as tribute for Fabrizio Meoni, who died during the previous stage.
- ^4 — Stage winner Ari Vatanen penalised for excess speed.

== Stage results ==
=== Motorcycles ===
	Stage result					General classification				
Stage	Pos	Competitor	Make	Time	Gap	Pos	Competitor	Make	Time	Gap
1	1	(France) David Frétigné	Yamaha	4:11		1	(France) David Frétigné	Yamaha	4:11	
1	2	(France) Cyril Despres	KTM	4:19	0:08	2	(France) Cyril Despres	KTM	4:19	0:08
1	3	(Netherlands) Eric Verhoef	KTM	4:24	0:13	3	(Netherlands) Eric Verhoef	KTM	4:24	0:13
2	Liaison only									
3	1	(France) David Frétigné	Yamaha	7:57		1	(France) David Frétigné	Yamaha	12:08	
3	2	(South Africa) Alfie Cox	KTM	7:59	0:02	2	(France) Cyril Despres	KTM	12:19	0:11
3	3	(France) Cyril Despres	KTM	8:00	0:03	3	(United States) Kellon Walch	KTM	12:55	0:47
4	Stage cancelled due to adverse weather conditions									
5	1	(Australia) Andy Caldecott	KTM	4:00:09		1	(Spain) Marc Coma	KTM	4:13:13	
5	2	(Spain) Marc Coma	KTM	4:00:12	0:03	2	(Australia) Andy Caldecott	KTM	4:13:57	0:43
5	3	(France) Cyril Despres	KTM	4:03:39	3:30	3	(France) Cyril Despres	KTM	4:15:58	2:45
6	1	(Italy) Fabrizio Meoni	KTM	4:37:14		1	(France) Cyril Despres	KTM	8:56:49	
6	2	(Norway) Pål Anders Ullevålseter	KTM	4:38:52	1:38	2	(Spain) Marc Coma	KTM	8:57:24	0:35
6	3	(South Africa) Alfie Cox	KTM	4:40:12	2:58	3	(Italy) Fabrizio Meoni	KTM	8:58:05	1:16
7	1	(France) David Frétigné	Yamaha	9:16:26		1	(Spain) Marc Coma	KTM	18:18:21	
7	2	(Spain) Marc Coma	KTM	9:20:57	4:31	2	(France) Cyril Despres	KTM	18:18:37	0:16
7	3	(France) Cyril Despres	KTM	9:21:48	5:22	3	(Australia) Andy Caldecott	KTM	18:24:01	5:40
8	Stage cancelled due to poor visibility									
9	1	(Spain) Isidre Esteve	KTM	5:14:10		1	(Italy) Fabrizio Meoni	KTM	23:41:32	
9	2	(Italy) Fabrizio Meoni	KTM	5:15:39	1:29	2	(France) Cyril Despres	KTM	23:44:27	2:55
9	3	(Norway) Pål Anders Ullevålseter	KTM	5:18:19	4:09	3	(Spain) Marc Coma	KTM	23:46:23	4:51
10	1	(France) Cyril Despres	KTM	5:28:26		1	(France) Cyril Despres	KTM	29:12:53	
10	2	(Italy) Fabrizio Meoni	KTM	5:38:34	10:08	2	(Italy) Fabrizio Meoni	KTM	29:20:06	7:13
10	3	(Spain) Isidre Esteve	KTM	5:40:50	12:24	3	(Spain) Marc Coma	KTM	29:28:55	16:02
11	1	(Spain) Marc Coma	KTM	5:58:59		1	(France) Cyril Despres	KTM	35:13:04	
11	2	(France) Cyril Despres	KTM	6:00:11	1:12	2	(Spain) Marc Coma	KTM	35:27:54	14:50
11	3	(Spain) Isidre Esteve	KTM	6:02:56	3:57	3	(Spain) Isidre Esteve	KTM	35:35:27	22:23
12	Stage cancelled due to death of Fabrizio Meoni									
13	1	(Australia) Andy Caldecott	KTM	3:51:41		1	(France) Cyril Despres	KTM	39:13:03	
13	2	(France) David Frétigné	Yamaha	3:53:47	2:06	2	(Spain) Marc Coma	KTM	39:29:09	16:06
13	3	(United States) Chris Blais	KTM	3:55:13	3:32	3	(South Africa) Alfie Cox	KTM	39:33:42	20:39
14	1	(Brazil) Jean de Azevedo	KTM	5:10:56		1	(France) Cyril Despres	KTM	44:39:59^{1}	
14	2	(United States) Chris Blais	KTM	5:11:19	0:23	2	(Spain) Marc Coma	KTM	44:43:15	3:16
14	3	(South Africa) Alfie Cox	KTM	5:11:30	0:34	3	(South Africa) Alfie Cox	KTM	44:45:12	5:13
15	1	(France) Cyril Despres	KTM	2:27:37		1	(France) Cyril Despres	KTM	47:07:36	
15	2	(France) Alain Duclos	KTM	2:29:01	1:24	2	(Spain) Marc Coma	KTM	47:17:21	9:45
15	3	(Australia) Andy Caldecott	KTM	2:29:31	1:54	3	(South Africa) Alfie Cox	KTM	47:19:45	12:09
16	1	(United States) Kellon Walch	KTM	17:17		1	(France) Cyril Despres	KTM	47:27:31	
16	2	(Spain) Isidre Esteve	KTM	18:09	0:52	2	(Spain) Marc Coma	KTM	47:26:38	9:17
16	3	(Netherlands) Eric Verhoef	KTM	18:12	0:55	3	(South Africa) Alfie Cox	KTM	47:39:00	11:29

Notes:

- ^1 — Despres' time includes a nine-minute penalty.

=== Cars ===
	Stage result					General classification				
Stage	Pos	Competitor	Make	Time	Gap	Pos	Competitor	Make	Time	Gap
1	1	(United States) Robby Gordon (Germany) Dirk von Zitzewitz	Volkswagen	4:20		1	(United States) Robby Gordon (Germany) Dirk von Zitzewitz	Volkswagen	4:20	
1	2	(Japan) Hiroshi Masuoka (Germany) Andreas Schulz	Mitsubishi	4:22	0:02	2	(Japan) Hiroshi Masuoka (Germany) Andreas Schulz	Mitsubishi	4:22	0:02
1	3	(South Africa) Giniel de Villiers (Belgium) Jean-Marie Lurquin	Nissan	4:23	0:03	3	(South Africa) Giniel de Villiers (Belgium) Jean-Marie Lurquin	Nissan	4:23	0:03
2	Liaison only									
3	1	(United Kingdom) Colin McRae (Sweden) Tina Thörner	Nissan	7:48		1	(United Kingdom) Colin McRae (Sweden) Tina Thörner	Nissan	12:22	
3	2	(France) Stéphane Peterhansel (France) Jean-Paul Cottret	Mitsubishi	7:54	0:06	2	(United States) Robby Gordon (Germany) Dirk von Zitzewitz	Volkswagen	12:23	0:01
3	3	(Finland) Ari Vatanen (Italy) Tiziano Siviero	Nissan	7:58	0:10	3	(South Africa) Giniel de Villiers (Belgium) Jean-Marie Lurquin	Nissan	12:24	0:02
4	1	(United States) Robby Gordon (Germany) Dirk von Zitzewitz	Volkswagen	1:14:01		1	(United States) Robby Gordon (Germany) Dirk von Zitzewitz	Volkswagen	1:26:24	
4	2	(France) Stéphane Peterhansel (France) Jean-Paul Cottret	Mitsubishi	1:14:54	0:53	2	(France) Stéphane Peterhansel (France) Jean-Paul Cottret	Mitsubishi	1:27:23	0:59
4	3	(France) Bruno Saby (France) Michel Périn	Volkswagen	1:15:09	1:08	3	(France) Bruno Saby (France) Michel Périn	Volkswagen	1:27:38	1:14
5	1	(United Kingdom) Colin McRae (Sweden) Tina Thörner	Nissan	3:37:14		1	(United Kingdom) Colin McRae (Sweden) Tina Thörner	Nissan	5:07:24	
5	2	(South Africa) Giniel de Villiers (Belgium) Jean-Marie Lurquin	Nissan	3:43:29	6:15	2	(South Africa) Giniel de Villiers (Belgium) Jean-Marie Lurquin	Nissan	5:12:52	5:28
5	3	(Germany) Jutta Kleinschmidt (Italy) Fabrizia Pons	Volkswagen	3:44:32	7:18	3	(France) Luc Alphand (France) Gilles Picard	Mitsubishi	5:13:25	6:01
6	1	(France) Stéphane Peterhansel (France) Jean-Paul Cottret	Mitsubishi	4:00:29		1	(France) Bruno Saby (France) Michel Périn	Volkswagen	9:22:31	
6	2	(Japan) Hiroshi Masuoka (Germany) Andreas Schulz	Mitsubishi	4:06:27	5:58	2	(France) Luc Alphand (France) Gilles Picard	Mitsubishi	9:23:11	0:40
6	3	(France) Bruno Saby (France) Michel Périn	Volkswagen	4:07:55	7:26	3	(Germany) Jutta Kleinschmidt (Italy) Fabrizia Pons	Volkswagen	9:26:27	3:56
7	1	(France) Stéphane Peterhansel (France) Jean-Paul Cottret	Mitsubishi	8:21:57		1	(France) Stéphane Peterhansel (France) Jean-Paul Cottret	Mitsubishi	17:51:47	
7	2	(Qatar) Nasser Al-Attiyah (France) Alain Guehennec	BMW	8:47:37	25:40	2	(France) Luc Alphand (France) Gilles Picard	Mitsubishi	18:13:19	21:32
7	3	(Germany) Jutta Kleinschmidt (Italy) Fabrizia Pons	Volkswagen	8:48:04	26:07	3	(Germany) Jutta Kleinschmidt (Italy) Fabrizia Pons	Volkswagen	18:14:31	22:44
8	Stage cancelled due to poor visibility									
9	1	(France) Luc Alphand (France) Gilles Picard	Mitsubishi	4:52:39		1	(France) Stéphane Peterhansel (France) Jean-Paul Cottret	Mitsubishi	22:45:57	
9	2	(France) Stéphane Peterhansel (France) Jean-Paul Cottret	Mitsubishi	4:54:10	1:31	2	(France) Luc Alphand (France) Gilles Picard	Mitsubishi	23:05:58	20:01
9	3	(United States) Robby Gordon (Germany) Dirk von Zitzewitz	Volkswagen	5:10:08	17:29	3	(Germany) Jutta Kleinschmidt (Italy) Fabrizia Pons	Volkswagen	23:26:23	40:26
10	1	(France) Stéphane Peterhansel (France) Jean-Paul Cottret	Mitsubishi	5:22:58		1	(France) Stéphane Peterhansel (France) Jean-Paul Cottret	Mitsubishi	28:08:55	
10	2	(France) Luc Alphand (France) Gilles Picard	Mitsubishi	5:24:25	1:27	2	(France) Luc Alphand (France) Gilles Picard	Mitsubishi	28:30:23	21:28
10	3	(Germany) Jutta Kleinschmidt (Italy) Fabrizia Pons	Volkswagen	5:53:17	30:19	3	(Germany) Jutta Kleinschmidt (Italy) Fabrizia Pons	Volkswagen	29:19:40	1:10:45
11	1	(Germany) Jutta Kleinschmidt (Italy) Fabrizia Pons	Volkswagen	5:29:37		1	(France) Stéphane Peterhansel (France) Jean-Paul Cottret	Mitsubishi	33:41:14	
11	2	(France) Luc Alphand (France) Gilles Picard	Mitsubishi	5:30:41	1:04	2	(France) Luc Alphand (France) Gilles Picard	Mitsubishi	34:01:04	19:50
11	3	(France) Stéphane Peterhansel (France) Jean-Paul Cottret	Mitsubishi	5:32:19	2:42	3	(Germany) Jutta Kleinschmidt (Italy) Fabrizia Pons	Volkswagen	34:49:17	1:08:03
12	1	(South Africa) Giniel de Villiers (Belgium) Jean-Marie Lurquin	Nissan	7:20:58		1	(France) Stéphane Peterhansel (France) Jean-Paul Cottret	Mitsubishi	41:05:13	
12	2	(France) Stéphane Peterhansel (France) Jean-Paul Cottret	Mitsubishi	7:23:59	3:01	2	(France) Luc Alphand (France) Gilles Picard	Mitsubishi	41:28:29	23:16
12	3	(France) Luc Alphand (France) Gilles Picard	Mitsubishi	7:27:25	6:27	3	(Germany) Jutta Kleinschmidt (Italy) Fabrizia Pons	Volkswagen	42:24:00	1:18:47
13	1	(France) Stéphane Peterhansel (France) Jean-Paul Cottret	Mitsubishi	3:30:07		1	(France) Stéphane Peterhansel (France) Jean-Paul Cottret	Mitsubishi	44:35:20	
13	2	(France) Luc Alphand (France) Gilles Picard	Mitsubishi	3:34:24	4:17	2	(France) Luc Alphand (France) Gilles Picard	Mitsubishi	45:02:53	27:33
13	3	(South Africa) Giniel de Villiers (Belgium) Jean-Marie Lurquin	Nissan	3:38:06	7:59	3	(Germany) Jutta Kleinschmidt (Italy) Fabrizia Pons	Volkswagen	46:06:15	1:30:55
14	1	(France) Bruno Saby (France) Michel Périn	Volkswagen	4:59:24		1	(France) Stéphane Peterhansel (France) Jean-Paul Cottret	Mitsubishi	49:46:23	
14	2	(South Africa) Giniel de Villiers (Belgium) Jean-Marie Lurquin	Nissan	5:01:53	2:29	2	(France) Luc Alphand (France) Gilles Picard	Mitsubishi	50:13:05	26:41
14	3	(Finland) Ari Vatanen (Italy) Tiziano Siviero	Nissan	5:02:08^{1}	2:44	3	(Germany) Jutta Kleinschmidt (Italy) Fabrizia Pons	Volkswagen	53:02:40	3:16:17
15	1	(South Africa) Giniel de Villiers (Belgium) Jean-Marie Lurquin	Nissan	2:21:15		1	(France) Stéphane Peterhansel (France) Jean-Paul Cottret	Mitsubishi	52:09:30	
15	2	(France) Bruno Saby (France) Michel Périn	Volkswagen	2:22:12	0:57	2	(France) Luc Alphand (France) Gilles Picard	Mitsubishi	52:36:43	27:13
15	3	(Portugal) Carlos Sousa (France) Thierry Delli-Zotti	Nissan	2:22:15	1:00	3	(Germany) Jutta Kleinschmidt (Italy) Fabrizia Pons	Volkswagen	55:32:47	3:23:17
16	1	(France) Bruno Saby (France) Michel Périn	Volkswagen	19:00		1	(France) Stéphane Peterhansel (France) Jean-Paul Cottret	Mitsubishi	52:31:39	
16	2	(France) Thierry Magnaldi (Belgium) Jean-Paul Forthomme	Honda	19:20	0:20	2	(France) Luc Alphand (France) Gilles Picard	Mitsubishi	52:58:53	27:14
16	3	(Finland) Ari Vatanen (Italy) Tiziano Siviero	Nissan	19:57	0:57	3	(Germany) Jutta Kleinschmidt (Italy) Fabrizia Pons	Volkswagen	55:53:39	3:22:00

Notes:

- ^1 — Vatanen's time includes a 12-minute penalty for excess speed during the liaison section of the stage.

=== Trucks ===
	Stage result					General classification				
Stage	Pos	Competitor	Make	Time	Gap	Pos	Competitor	Make	Time	Gap
1	1	(Netherlands) Hans Bekx (Belgium) Tonie Maessen (Netherlands) Edwin Willems	DAF	5:20		1	(Netherlands) Hans Bekx (Belgium) Tonie Maessen (Netherlands) Edwin Willems	DAF	5:20	
1	2	(Russia) Firdaus Kabirov (Russia) Aydar Belyaev (Russia) Andrey Mokeev	Kamaz	5:35	0:15	2	(Russia) Firdaus Kabirov (Russia) Aydar Belyaev (Russia) Andrey Mokeev	Kamaz	5:35	0:15
1	3	(Netherlands) Jan de Rooy (Belgium) Dany Colebunders (Belgium) Clemens Smulders	DAF	5:36	0:16	3	(Netherlands) Jan de Rooy (Belgium) Dany Colebunders (Belgium) Clemens Smulders	DAF	5:36	0:16
2	Liaison only									
3	1	(Netherlands) Hans Bekx (Belgium) Tonie Maessen (Netherlands) Edwin Willems	DAF	9:56		1	(Netherlands) Hans Bekx (Belgium) Tonie Maessen (Netherlands) Edwin Willems	DAF	15:16	
3	2	(Russia) Firdaus Kabirov (Russia) Aydar Belyaev (Russia) Andrey Mokeev	Kamaz	10:05	0:09	2	(Russia) Firdaus Kabirov (Russia) Aydar Belyaev (Russia) Andrey Mokeev	Kamaz	15:40	0:24
3	3	(Netherlands) Gérard de Rooy (Belgium) Tom Colsoul (Netherlands) Arno Slaats	DAF	10:17	0:21	3	(Netherlands) Jan de Rooy (Belgium) Dany Colebunders (Belgium) Clemens Smulders	DAF	15:56	0:40
4	1	(Russia) Vladimir Chagin (Russia) Semen Yakubov (Russia) Sergey Savostin	Kamaz	1:28:38		1	(Russia) Vladimir Chagin (Russia) Semen Yakubov (Russia) Sergey Savostin	Kamaz	1:45:05	
4	2	(Netherlands) Gérard de Rooy (Belgium) Tom Colsoul (Netherlands) Arno Slaats	DAF	1:30:12	1:34	2	(Russia) Firdaus Kabirov (Russia) Aydar Belyaev (Russia) Andrey Mokeev	Kamaz	1:46:15	1:10
4	3	(Russia) Firdaus Kabirov (Russia) Aydar Belyaev (Russia) Andrey Mokeev	Kamaz	1:30:35	1:57	3	(Netherlands) Gérard de Rooy (Belgium) Tom Colsoul (Netherlands) Arno Slaats	DAF	1:46:15	1:10
5	1	(Russia) Vladimir Chagin (Russia) Semen Yakubov (Russia) Sergey Savostin	Kamaz	4:34:00		1	(Russia) Vladimir Chagin (Russia) Semen Yakubov (Russia) Sergey Savostin	Kamaz	6:19:05	
5	2	(Brazil) André de Azevedo (Brazil) Luis Antonio Azevedo (Czech Republic) Jaromír Martinec	Tatra	4:35:46	1:46	2	(Russia) Firdaus Kabirov (Russia) Aydar Belyaev (Russia) Andrey Mokeev	Kamaz	6:25:23	6:18
5	3	(Czech Republic) Karel Loprais (Czech Republic) Petr Gilar (Czech Republic) Josef Kalina	Tatra	4:38:26	4:26	3	(Brazil) André de Azevedo (Brazil) Luis Antonio Azevedo (Czech Republic) Jaromír Martinec	Tatra	6:26:39	7:34
6	1	(Russia) Vladimir Chagin (Russia) Semen Yakubov (Russia) Sergey Savostin	Kamaz	4:43:22		1	(Russia) Vladimir Chagin (Russia) Semen Yakubov (Russia) Sergey Savostin	Kamaz	11:02:27	
6	2	(Netherlands) Hans Bekx (Belgium) Tonie Maessen (Netherlands) Edwin Willems	DAF	5:01:24	18:02	2	(Russia) Firdaus Kabirov (Russia) Aydar Belyaev (Russia) Andrey Mokeev	Kamaz	11:28:02	25:35
6	3	(Russia) Firdaus Kabirov (Russia) Aydar Belyaev (Russia) Andrey Mokeev	Kamaz	5:02:39	19:17	3	(Brazil) André de Azevedo (Brazil) Luis Antonio Azevedo (Czech Republic) Jaromír Martinec	Tatra	11:36:26	33:59
7	1	(Russia) Firdaus Kabirov (Russia) Aydar Belyaev (Russia) Andrey Mokeev	Kamaz	11:43:01		1	(Russia) Firdaus Kabirov (Russia) Aydar Belyaev (Russia) Andrey Mokeev	Kamaz	23:11:03	
7	2	(Japan) Yoshimasa Sugawara (Japan) Katsumi Hamura	Hino	13:09:34	1:26:33	2	(Netherlands) Hans Bekx (Belgium) Tonie Maessen (Netherlands) Edwin Willems	DAF	24:48:45	1:37:42
7	3	(Netherlands) Hans Bekx (Belgium) Tonie Maessen (Netherlands) Edwin Willems	DAF	13:12:12	1:29:11	3	(Japan) Yoshimasa Sugawara (Japan) Katsumi Hamura	Hino	26:43:36	3:32:33
8	Stage cancelled due to poor visibility									
9	1	(Russia) Vladimir Chagin (Russia) Semen Yakubov (Russia) Sergey Savostin	Kamaz	6:08:38		1	(Russia) Firdaus Kabirov (Russia) Aydar Belyaev (Russia) Andrey Mokeev	Kamaz	29:58:02	
9	2	(Netherlands) Hans Stacey (Belgium) Eddy Chevaillier (Netherlands) Johan van Gestel	MAN	6:26:23	17:45	2	(Netherlands) Hans Bekx (Belgium) Tonie Maessen (Netherlands) Edwin Willems	DAF	31:39:24	1:41:22
9	3	(Czech Republic) Karel Loprais (Czech Republic) Petr Gilar (Czech Republic) Josef Kalina	Tatra	6:27:33	18:55	3	(Japan) Yoshimasa Sugawara (Japan) Katsumi Hamura	Hino	33:45:32	3:47:30
10	1	(Russia) Firdaus Kabirov (Russia) Aydar Belyaev (Russia) Andrey Mokeev	Kamaz	7:49:49		1	(Russia) Firdaus Kabirov (Russia) Aydar Belyaev (Russia) Andrey Mokeev	Kamaz	37:47:51	
10	2	(Russia) Vladimir Chagin (Russia) Semen Yakubov (Russia) Sergey Savostin	Kamaz	8:06:58	17:09	2	(Netherlands) Hans Bekx (Belgium) Tonie Maessen (Netherlands) Edwin Willems	DAF	40:05:10	2:17:19
10	3	(Netherlands) Jan de Rooy (Belgium) Dany Colebunders (Belgium) Clemens Smulders	DAF	8:15:53	26:04	3	(Japan) Yoshimasa Sugawara (Japan) Katsumi Hamura	Hino	42:14:36	4:26:45
11	1	(Netherlands) Hans Bekx (Belgium) Tonie Maessen (Netherlands) Edwin Willems	DAF	7:28:16		1	(Russia) Firdaus Kabirov (Russia) Aydar Belyaev (Russia) Andrey Mokeev	Kamaz	45:32:31	
11	2	(Netherlands) Gérard de Rooy (Belgium) Tom Colsoul (Netherlands) Arno Slaats	DAF	7:32:22	4:06	2	(Netherlands) Hans Bekx (Belgium) Tonie Maessen (Netherlands) Edwin Willems	DAF	47:33:26	2:00:55
11	3	(Russia) Vladimir Chagin (Russia) Semen Yakubov (Russia) Sergey Savostin	Kamaz	7:39:35	11:19	3	(Japan) Yoshimasa Sugawara (Japan) Katsumi Hamura	Hino	50:25:44	4:53:13
12	1	(Netherlands) Gérard de Rooy (Belgium) Tom Colsoul (Netherlands) Arno Slaats	DAF	9:35:14		1	(Russia) Firdaus Kabirov (Russia) Aydar Belyaev (Russia) Andrey Mokeev	Kamaz	55:13:02	
12	2	(Russia) Firdaus Kabirov (Russia) Aydar Belyaev (Russia) Andrey Mokeev	Kamaz	9:40:31	5:17	2	(Netherlands) Hans Bekx (Belgium) Tonie Maessen (Netherlands) Edwin Willems	DAF	58:09:14	2:56:12
12	3	(Netherlands) Jan de Rooy (Belgium) Dany Colebunders (Belgium) Clemens Smulders	DAF	10:30:02	54:48	3	(Italy) Giacomo Vismara (Italy) Mario Cambiaghi (Italy) Claudio Bellina	Mercedes-Benz	61:24:35	6:11:33
13	1	(Netherlands) Gérard de Rooy (Belgium) Tom Colsoul (Netherlands) Arno Slaats	DAF	4:27:38		1	(Russia) Firdaus Kabirov (Russia) Aydar Belyaev (Russia) Andrey Mokeev	Kamaz	60:32:35	
13	2	(Netherlands) Jan de Rooy (Belgium) Dany Colebunders (Belgium) Clemens Smulders	DAF	4:46:28	18:50	2	(Netherlands) Hans Bekx (Belgium) Tonie Maessen (Netherlands) Edwin Willems	DAF	63:12:55	2:40:20
13	3	(Belgium) Hugo Duisters (Belgium) Yvo Geusens (Morocco) Mohamed El Bouzidi	DAF	4:59:01	31:23	3	(Japan) Yoshimasa Sugawara (Japan) Katsumi Hamura	Hino	66:35:18	6:02:43
14	1	(Netherlands) Gérard de Rooy (Belgium) Tom Colsoul (Netherlands) Arno Slaats	DAF	6:32:14		1	(Russia) Firdaus Kabirov (Russia) Aydar Belyaev (Russia) Andrey Mokeev	Kamaz	67:35:58	
14	2	(Japan) Yoshimasa Sugawara (Japan) Katsumi Hamura	Hino	6:56:52	24:38	2	(Netherlands) Hans Bekx (Belgium) Tonie Maessen (Netherlands) Edwin Willems	DAF	70:31:19	2:55:21
14	3	(Russia) Firdaus Kabirov (Russia) Aydar Belyaev (Russia) Andrey Mokeev	Kamaz	7:03:23	31:09	3	(Japan) Yoshimasa Sugawara (Japan) Katsumi Hamura	Hino	73:32:10	5:56:12
15	1	(Russia) Vladimir Chagin (Russia) Semen Yakubov (Russia) Sergey Savostin	Kamaz	2:49:57		1	(Russia) Firdaus Kabirov (Russia) Aydar Belyaev (Russia) Andrey Mokeev	Kamaz	70:45:58	
15	2	(Belgium) Hugo Duisters (Belgium) Yvo Geusens (Morocco) Mohamed El Bouzidi	DAF	2:56:34	6:37	2	(Netherlands) Hans Bekx (Belgium) Tonie Maessen (Netherlands) Edwin Willems	DAF	73:49:17	3:03:19
15	3	(Netherlands) Gérard de Rooy (Belgium) Tom Colsoul (Netherlands) Arno Slaats	DAF	3:03:16	13:19	3	(Japan) Yoshimasa Sugawara (Japan) Katsumi Hamura	Hino	76:46:33	6:00:35
16	1	(Russia) Vladimir Chagin (Russia) Semen Yakubov (Russia) Sergey Savostin	Kamaz	24:52		1	(Russia) Firdaus Kabirov (Russia) Aydar Belyaev (Russia) Andrey Mokeev	Kamaz	71:33:55	
16	2	(Belgium) Hugo Duisters (Belgium) Yvo Geusens (Morocco) Mohamed El Bouzidi	DAF	26:35	1:43	2	(Japan) Yoshimasa Sugawara (Japan) Katsumi Hamura	Hino	78:00:23	6:04:19
16	3	(Russia) Firdaus Kabirov (Russia) Aydar Belyaev (Russia) Andrey Mokeev	Kamaz	27:57	3:05	3	(Italy) Giacomo Vismara (Italy) Mario Cambiaghi (Italy) Claudio Bellina	Mercedes-Benz	78:00:23	6:46:28

== Final standings ==
=== Motorcycles ===
Pos	No.	Rider	Bike	Entrant	Time
1	2	(France) Cyril Despres	KTM LC4 660R	Gauloises KTM	47:27:31
2	6	(Spain) Marc Coma	KTM LC4 660R	KTM Repsol-Red Bull	+9:17
3	3	(South Africa) Alfie Cox	KTM LC4 660R	Gauloises KTM	+11:29
4	7	(Spain) Isidre Esteve	KTM LC4 660R	KTM Repsol-Red Bull	+11:51
5	12	(France) David Frétigné	Yamaha	Yamaha France	+33:36
6	23	(Australia) Andy Caldecott	KTM LC4 660R	KTM Team Australia	+48:11
7	25	(Brazil) Jean de Azevedo	KTM LC4 660R	Petrobras-Lubrax	+1:27:41
8	14	(Italy) Giovanni Sala	KTM LC4 660R	KTM Repsol-Red Bull	+1:33:53
9	22	(United States) Chris Blais	KTM LC4 660R	Red Bull KTM USA	+1:53:10
10	9	(France) Jean Brucy	KTM LC4 660R	Gauloises KTM	+3:11:39

=== Cars ===
Pos	No.	Driver	Co-Driver	Car	Entrant	Time
1	306	(France) Stéphane Peterhansel	(France) Jean-Paul Cottret	Mitsubishi	Mitsubishi Ralliart	52:31:39
2	312	(France) Luc Alphand	(France) Gilles Picard	Mitsubishi	Mitsubishi Ralliart	+27:14
3	310	(Germany) Jutta Kleinschmidt	(Italy) Fabrizia Pons	Volkswagen	Volkswagen Motorsport	+3:22:00
4	314	(South Africa) Giniel de Villiers	(Belgium) Jean-Marie Lurquin	Nissan	Nissan Rally Raid Team	+4:02:36
5	307	(France) Bruno Saby	(France) Michel Périn	Volkswagen	Volkswagen Motorsport	+8:44:14
6	320	(Spain) Nani Roma	(Andorra) Henri Magne	Mitsubishi	Mitsubishi Ralliart	+9:19:37
7	315	(Portugal) Carlos Sousa	(France) Thierry Delli-Zotti	Nissan	Nissan Dessoude	+10:02:29
8	305	(France) Thierry Magnaldi	(Belgium) Jean-Paul Forthomme	Honda	Fast & Speed Honda	+11:03:44
9	325	(Spain) José Luis Monterde	(Spain) Rafael Tornabell	BMW	Team X-Raid	+13:27:31
10	353	(Spain) Ramon Dalmau	(Spain) Enric Oller	Mitsubishi	Epsilon Team	+19:16:53

=== Trucks ===
Pos	No.	Driver	Co-Drivers	Truck	Time
1	520	(Russia) Firdaus Kabirov	(Russia) Aydar Belyaev (Russia) Andrey Mokeev	Kamaz	71:13:55
2	500	(Japan) Yoshimasa Sugawara	(Japan) Katsumi Hamura	Hino	+6:04:19
3	503	(Italy) Giacomo Vismara	(Italy) Mario Cambiaghi (Italy) Claudio Bellina	Mercedes-Benz	+6:46:28
4	521	(Netherlands) Jan de Rooy	(Belgium) Dany Colebunders (Belgium) Clemens Smulders	DAF	+7:37:43
5	516	(Netherlands) Gérard de Rooy	(Belgium) Tom Colsoul (Netherlands) Arno Slaats	DAF	+9:34:39
6	501	(Japan) Teruhito Sugawara	(Japan) Seiichi Suzuki	Hino	+11:05:33
7	522	(Finland) Markku Alén	(Italy) Toni Guido (Italy) Adriano Micozzi	Iveco	+11:26:19
8	542	(Austria) Karl Sadlauer	(Austria) Franz Maier (Austria) Martin Mayer	MAN	+12:18:50
9	543	(Austria) Peter Reif	(Austria) Gunter Pichlbauer (Austria) Stefan Huber	MAN	+12:34:39
10	552	(Belgium) Jan Govaere	(Belgium) Mario Gherardyn (Belgium) Yves Despiegelaere	GINAF	+14:03:24
