= Jordi Arcarons =

Spanish motorcycle racer

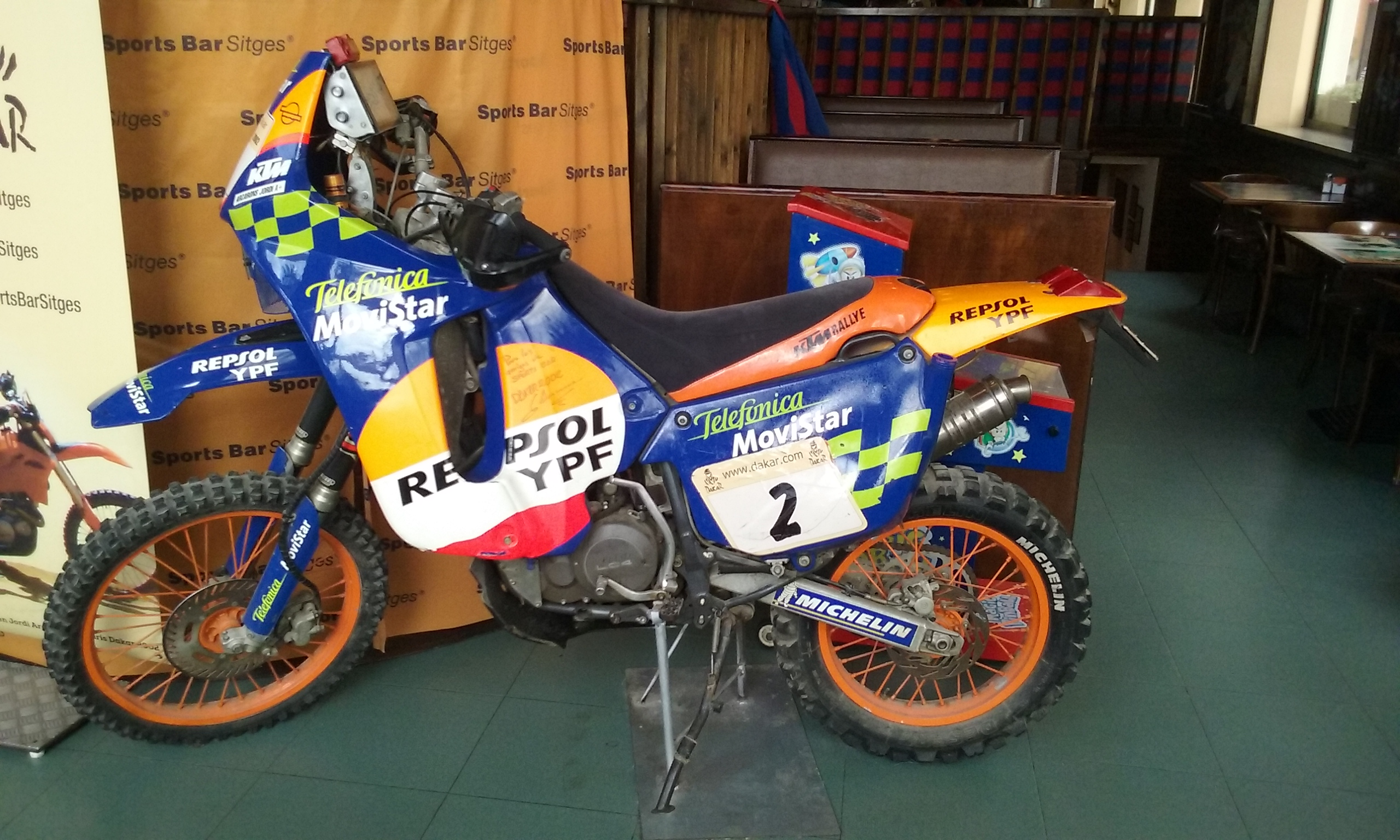
- Jordi Arcarons KTM LC4 660R (Movistar Team) used at 2002 Dakar Rally

Personal information
- Full name: Jordi Arcarons Armenteras
- Born: June 6, 1962 (age 64) Vic, Spain

Sport
- Country: Spain
- Sport: Motorsport
- Event: Rally raid
Medal record
Rally raid
Event	1st	2nd	3rd
Dakar Rally	0	4	2
Rallye des Pharaons	2	0	0
Abu Dhabi Desert Challenge	1	0	0
Baja Aragón	2	0	0
Atlas Rally	2	0	0
Total	7	4	2

Jordi Arcarons (born 6 June 1962) is a former Spanish rally raid biker, six-times on podium at the Dakar Rally. Also with 27 stages won is third in this special ranking behind the French bikers Stéphane Peterhansel and Cyril Despres.

== Rally Dakar ==
Arcarons has participated in 17 Dakar Rallys since 1988.

Year	Bike	Rank	Stages
1988	Merlin	31st	0
1989	Suzuki DR Big	Ret.	0
1990	Cagiva Elefant 900	7th	2
1991	Cagiva Elefant 900	5th	2
1992	Cagiva Elefant 900	3rd	1
1993	Yamaha YZE 850T	3rd	6
1994	Cagiva Elefant 900	2nd	5
1995	[Cagiva Elefant 900	2nd	2
1996	KTM LC4	2nd	3
1997	KTM LC4	Ret.	1
1998	KTM LC4	6th	1
1999	KTM LC4	4th	1
2000	KTM LC4	Ret.	1
2001	KTM LC4 660R	2nd	1
2002	KTM LC4 660R	7th	0
2003	KTM LC4 660R	Ret.	0
2011	KTM 450 Rally	41st	0
