= Marc Coma =

Spanish motorcycle racer (born 1976)

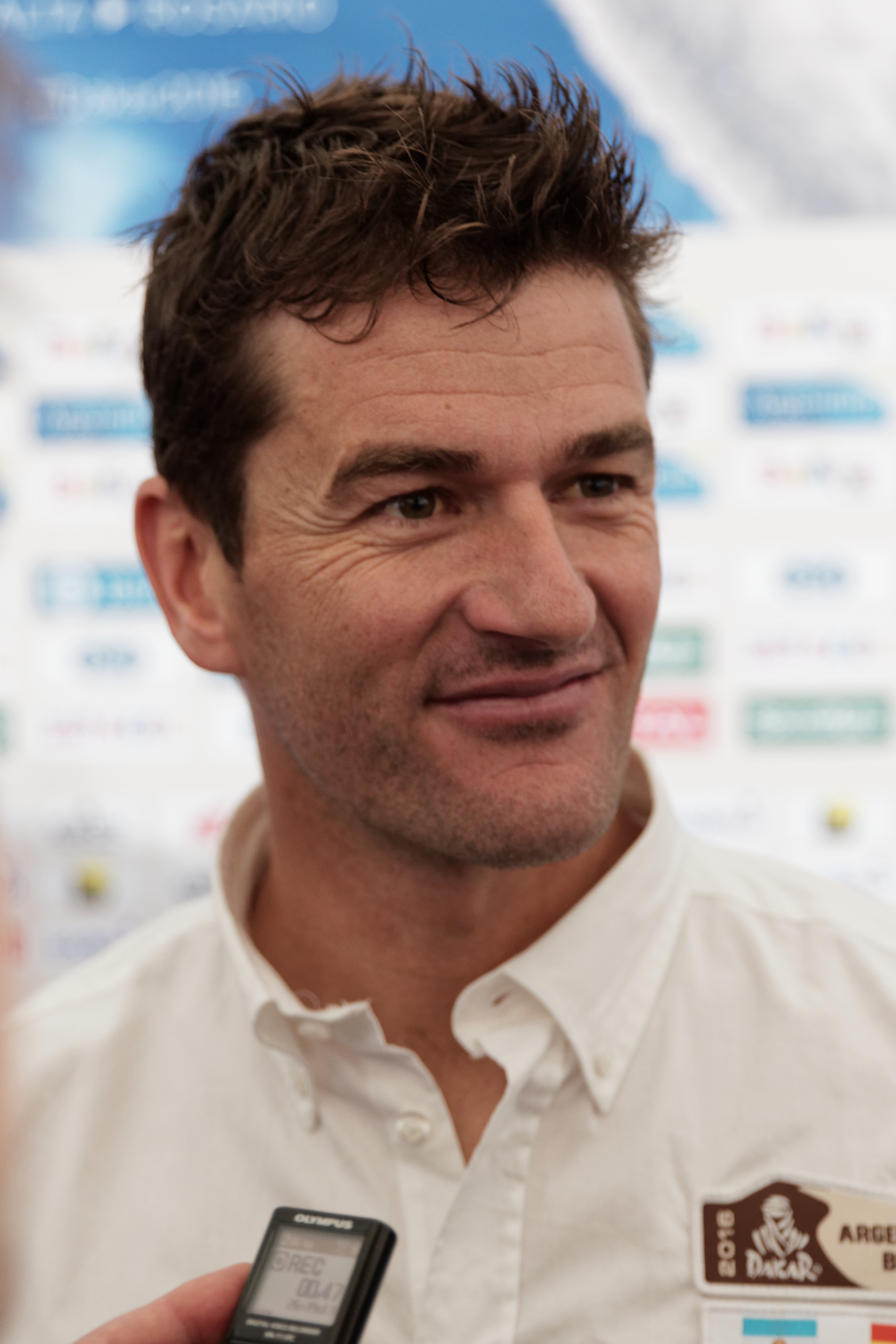
- Nationality: Spanish
- Born: 7 October 1976 (age 50) Avià, Barcelona

Dakar Rally career
- Debut season: 2002
- Former teams: KTM
- Starts: 12
- Wins: 5 (25 stage wins)
- Best finish: 1st in 2006, 2009, 2011, 2014, 2015

FIM Cross-Country Rallies World Championship career
- Debut season: 2004
- Former teams: KTM
- Championships: 6 (2005, 2006, 2007, 2010, 2012, 2014)
- Wins: 31

Marc Coma i Camps (born 7 October 1976) is a Spanish rally racing motorcycle rider. He won the Dakar Rally in 2006, 2009, 2011, 2014, and 2015 riding a KTM motorcycle, and is also a six-time winner of the FIM Cross-Country Rallies World Championship. He was the race director of the Dakar Rally from 2016 to 2018.

== Early life ==
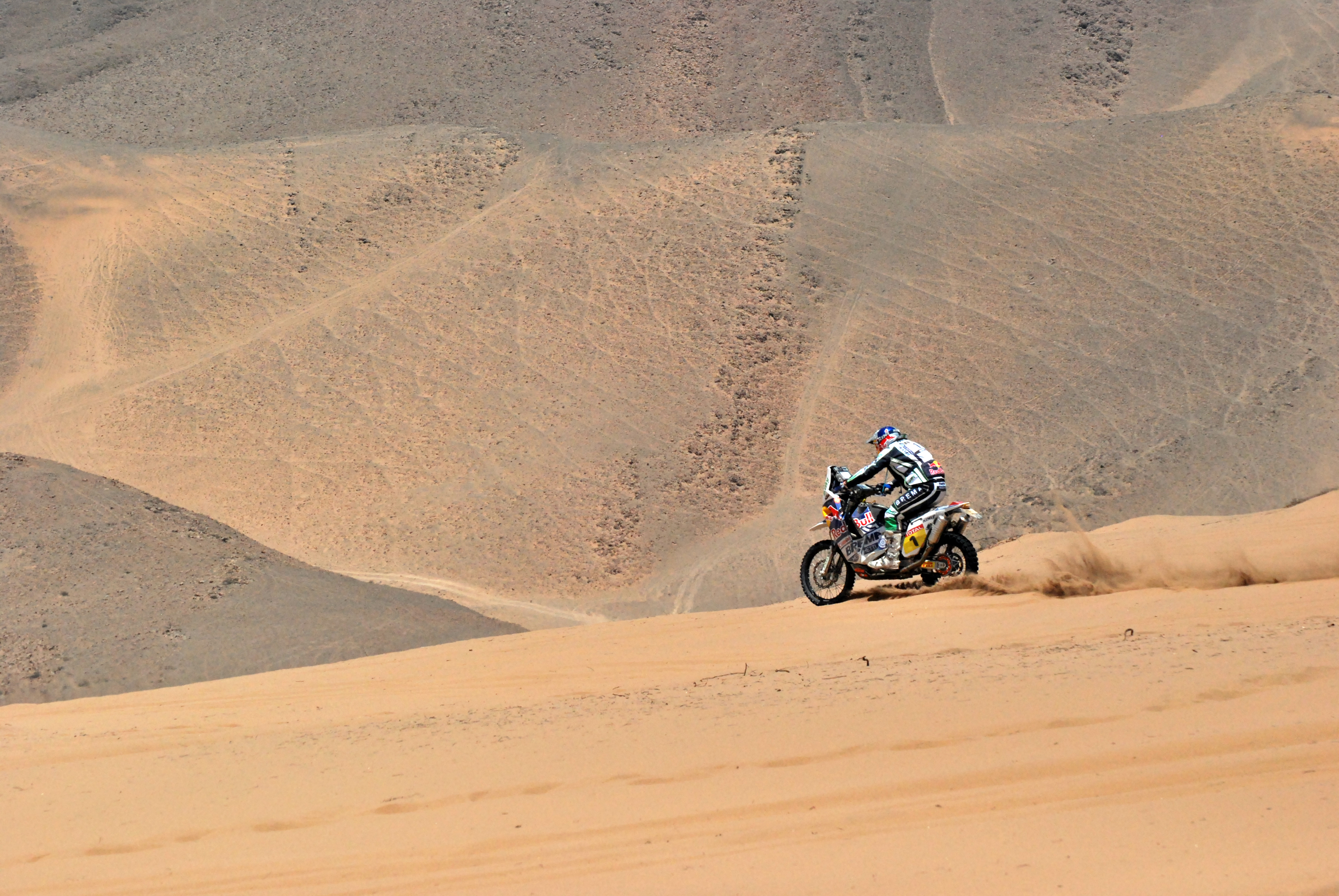
Coma running in the Dakar Rally 2010, near Copiapó.

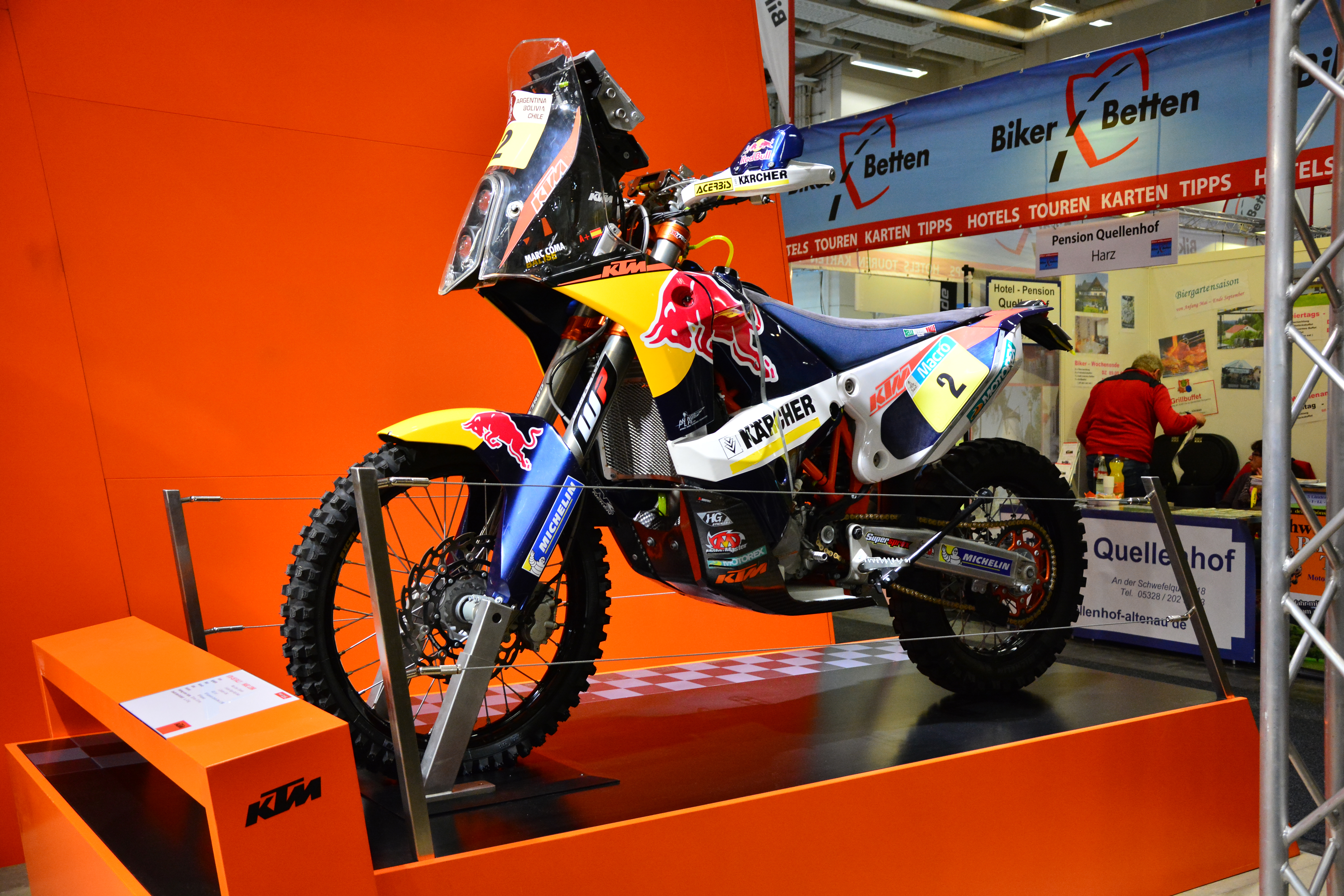
Marc Coma's KTM 450 Rally

Coma was born on 7 October 1976 in Avià, Barcelona, Catalonia, Spain. He started to be interested in motorcycling since childhood. His father, Ricard, became fifth in the Spanish Motocross Championship in the senior category. The first motorcycle he climbed was A Montesa Cota 348 when he was eight years old. When he got his own motorcycle, he began taking part in regional, provincial and national championships.

== Sport career ==
Coma started off his professional career as an enduro rider, tasting his first success in the Spanish Junior championships in 1995. The following year, he joined the Spanish national enduro team, which took silver in the World Cup for Nations, before Coma added the under-23 world championship crown to his résumé in 1998. The same year, he helped Spain to win the World Cup for Nations, also contributing to third-place finishes in 2000 and 2001.

2002 marked Coma's first Dakar Rally participation, aboard an unproven Suzuki-CSV backed by compatriot Carlos Sotelo. Coma climbed as high as seventh in the overall classification before retiring halfway through the rally, but his performance caught the eye of the factory Repsol-backed KTM team, which he joined in 2003. He finished third in four stages, but could finish no higher than 18th overall, and would retire from the rally in 2004 after suffering head injuries in a crash. The same year, he won the Baja España Aragón en route to seventh place in the Cross-Country Rallies World Championship.

2005 saw Coma take his first stage win in the Dakar and finish a close runner-up to KTM teammate Cyril Despres by a margin of under 10 minutes. He also contested four of that year's World Championships rounds, and victory in the Argentina-based Rally Por Las Pampas and Egyptian Rallye des Pharaons was enough for him to clinch the title. Despite failing to win any stages, Coma took his first overall Dakar victory in 2006, after which he successfully defended his Cross-Country Rallies title with five successive victories.

Coma dominated the 2007 Dakar Rally, winning three stages to build up a lead of almost an hour over his closest rival, Despres, before a navigational error and a crash with two stages remaining forced him to retire. He nonetheless was able to take a third Cross-Country Rallies title with another five victories that year. The Dakar was cancelled in 2008, Coma retiring early on from its replacement, the 2008 Central Europe Rally, after fracturing his knee in the second stage. That year, he finished third in the PAX Rally, the second Dakar Series event, and won the Baja España Aragón for a second time.

The Dakar moved to South America in 2009, Coma winning three of the first four stages and securing a comfortable second victory in the event, nearly 90 minutes clear of runner-up Despres. His 2010 challenge was ruined early on by a six-hour penalty for an illegal tyre change, although he still won five stage wins, but he made amends by winning all five Cross-Country Rallies Championship rounds that year to take an emphatic fourth title. This was followed by a third Dakar victory in 2011, during which Coma took another five stage wins to beat Despres by only 15 minutes. The following year's contest was even closer, with Coma and Despres separated by less than two minutes before Coma was forced to concede defeat when he lost 45 minutes due to an engine change penalty.

After winning the FIM Cross-Country Rallies World Championship in 2012, Coma was forced to withdraw from the 2013 Dakar Rally owing to a shoulder injury sustained in the Moroccan Rally. He recovered from this to finish runner-up in the World Championship with three wins, before taking a fourth Dakar victory on his return to the event in 2014 with a further two stage wins. He clinched a sixth world title the same year with victory in Morocco.

In 2015, Coma took the position of the Dakar’s Sporting Director, which he got by Etienne Lavigne. He commented upon it that: "My first reaction was ‘wow’… I was in shock! Winning the Dakar 5 times was already a dream for me, but now I realise just how lucky I am: being part of the organising team, with this level of responsibility is an opportunity for me to put back into the rally everything that the Dakar has given me".

For the 2020 Dakar Rally, Coma participated in the car category as the co-driver of Fernando Alonso, finishing in 13th place.

== Dakar Rally results ==
Year	Class	Vehicle	Position	Stages won
2002	Motorbike	(Japan) Suzuki	DNF	0
2003	Motorbike	(Austria) KTM	18th	0
2004	Motorbike	(Austria) KTM	DNF	0
2005	Motorbike	(Austria) KTM	2nd	1
2006	Motorbike	(Austria) KTM	1st	0
2007	Motorbike	(Austria) KTM	DNF	3
2008 (CE)	Motorbike	(Austria) KTM	DNF	1
2009	Motorbike	(Austria) KTM	1st	3
2010	Motorbike	(Austria) KTM	15th	4
2011	Motorbike	(Austria) KTM	1st	5
2012	Motorbike	(Austria) KTM	2nd	5
2013	Did not enter			
2014	Motorbike	(Austria) KTM	1st	2
2015	Motorbike	(Austria) KTM	1st	1

== Other results ==
=== FIM Cross-Country Rallies World Championship results ===
Year	Class	Bike	Races	Wins	Podiums	Points	Position
2004	Open	(Austria) KTM	3	0	2	54	7th
2005	Open	(Austria) KTM	4	2	4	94	1st
2006	Open	(Austria) KTM	5	5	5	125	1st
2007	Open	(Austria) KTM	5	5	5	125	1st
2008	Open	(Austria) KTM	2	0	0	-	DNC (Note: Did not classify as he competed out of the FIM regulations.)
2009	Open	(Austria) KTM	4	2	3	72	4th
2010	Open	(Austria) KTM	5	5	5	125	1st
2011	450cc	(Austria) KTM	3	3	3	75	3rd
2012	450cc	(Austria) KTM	3	2	3	55	1st
2013	450cc	(Austria) KTM	6	3	6	107	2nd
2014	450cc	(Austria) KTM	5	2	5	101	1st
2015	450cc	(Austria) KTM	3	2	2	70	4th

=== Rally raid best results (Motorbikes) ===
Event	Wins	Podiums
(United Arab Emirates) Abu Dhabi Desert Challenge	8	(gold) x8 (2006, 2007, 2009, 2010, 2011, 2012, 2013, 2015); (silver) x2 (2005, 2014)
(Italy) Sardegna Rally Race	6	(gold) x6 (2005, 2006, 2007, 2010, 2011, 2013); (silver) x1 (2014); (bronze) x1 (2012)
(Egypt) Rallye des Pharaons	5	(gold) x5 (2005, 2006, 2007, 2010, 2011)
(Argentina) Rally Patagonia-Atacama	3	(gold) x3 (2005, 2006, 2007)
(Morocco) Rallye du Maroc	3	(gold) x3 (2006, 2009, 2014); (silver) x3 (2004, 2005, 2013)
Qatar Cross-Country Rally	3	(gold) x3 (2012, 2013, 2015); (silver) x1 (2014)
(Brazil) Rally dos Sertões	2	(gold) x2 (2010, 2014); (bronze) x1 (2013)
(Spain) Spanish Baja	2	(gold) x2 (2004, 2008)
Rally of Tunisia	1	(gold) x1 (2007); (silver) x3 (2004, 2009, 2010)
(Portugal) PAX Rally	0	(bronze) x1 (2008)
(Argentina) Desafio Ruta 40	0	(bronze) x1 (2013)
(Chile) Atacama Rally	0	(bronze) x1 (2014)

Sporting positions
Preceded by Cyril Despres	Dakar Rally; Motorcycle Winner; 2006	Succeeded by Cyril Despres
Preceded by Cyril Despres	Dakar Rally; Motorcycle Winner; 2009	Succeeded by Cyril Despres
Preceded by Cyril Despres	Dakar Rally; Motorcycle Winner; 2011	Succeeded by Cyril Despres
Preceded by Cyril Despres	Dakar Rally; Motorcycle Winner; 2014–2015	Succeeded by Toby Price
