= Andy Caldecott =

Off-road motorcycle racer from South Australia (1964 – 2006)

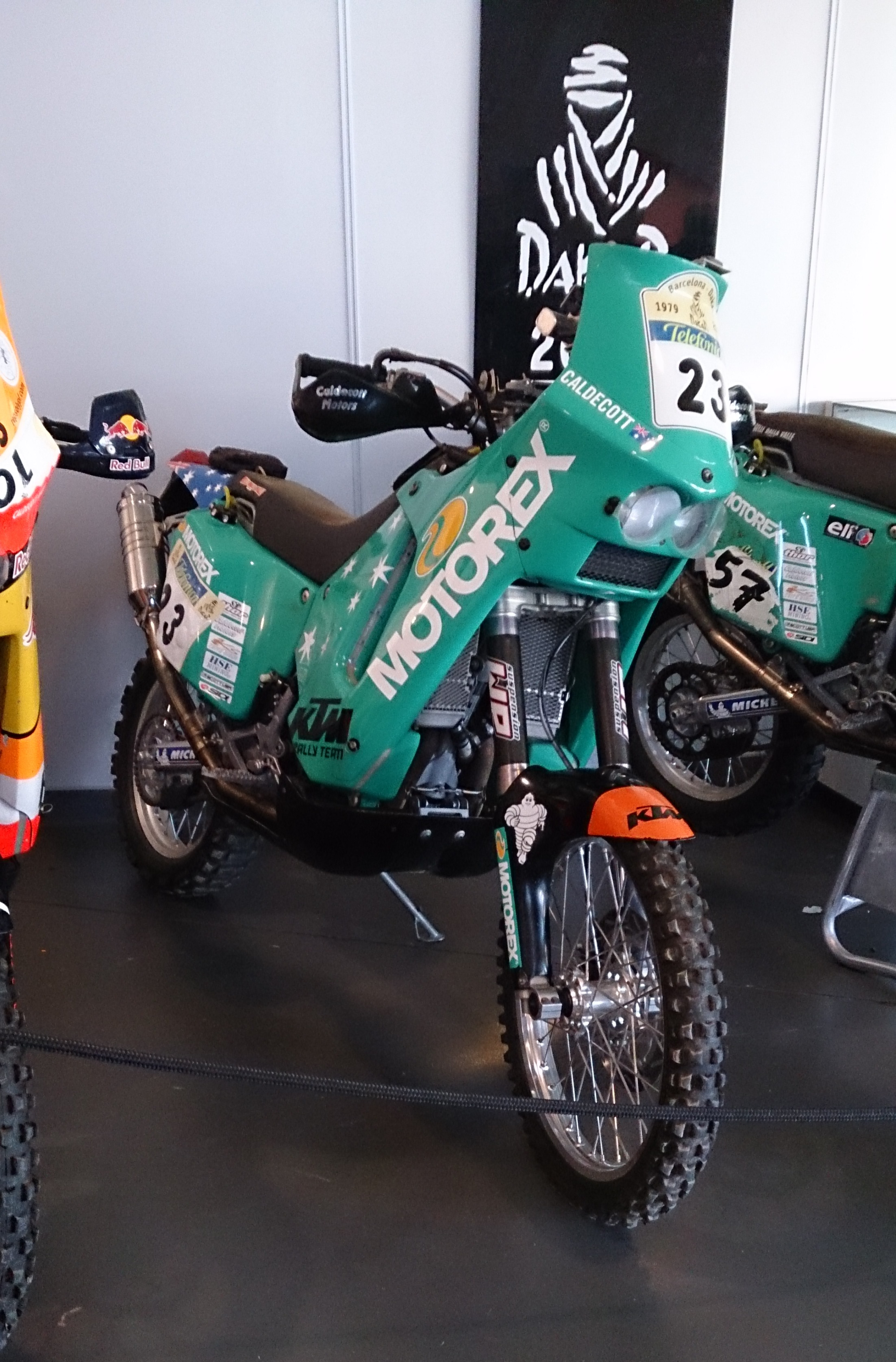
The KTM on which Caldecott placed sixth in the 2005 Dakar Rally

Andrew David Caldecott (10 August 1964 – 9 January 2006) was an off-road motorcycle racer born in Keith, South Australia. He won the motorcycle division of the Australian Safari Rally four times consecutively (2000–2003) and was a competitor in the Dakar Rally in 2004 (DNF), 2005 (6th), and 2006.

== Career ==
During the 2006 Dakar Rally he won the third stage, but later died from a neck injury sustained in a crash during the ninth stage, 250 km into the 599 km special stage from Nouakchott to Kiffa. His death was the 23rd in the 28 years of the rally.

Even though he pushed himself to the limits he was known for his easygoing manner and humility. Prior to his death he had operated a motorcycle shop in Keith. He was married to wife, Tracey, who was expecting their second child when Caldecott died and with whom he already had a daughter Caitlin of four years of age. A long-term capital investment trust has been set up for the ongoing support and benefit of Caldecott's wife Tracey, and their children.

== Tributes and awards ==
Prior to Andy going to the 2006 Dakar Rally, a video was done with him where he was discussing the death of another rider. It is titled "Andy Caldecott Memorial Tribute 2006"

The Keith & Districts Motor Cycle Club along with the Keith War Memorial Community Centre Committee decided to erect a Memorial to him and it was opened on 14 August 2011 named the "Andy Caldecott Memorial"

On Saturday 28 November 2015, Motorcycling SA Inc inducted Andy Caldecott into the Motorcycling SA Hall of Fame. With the help of key people from his career and life, a video was put together as a tribute to Andy.

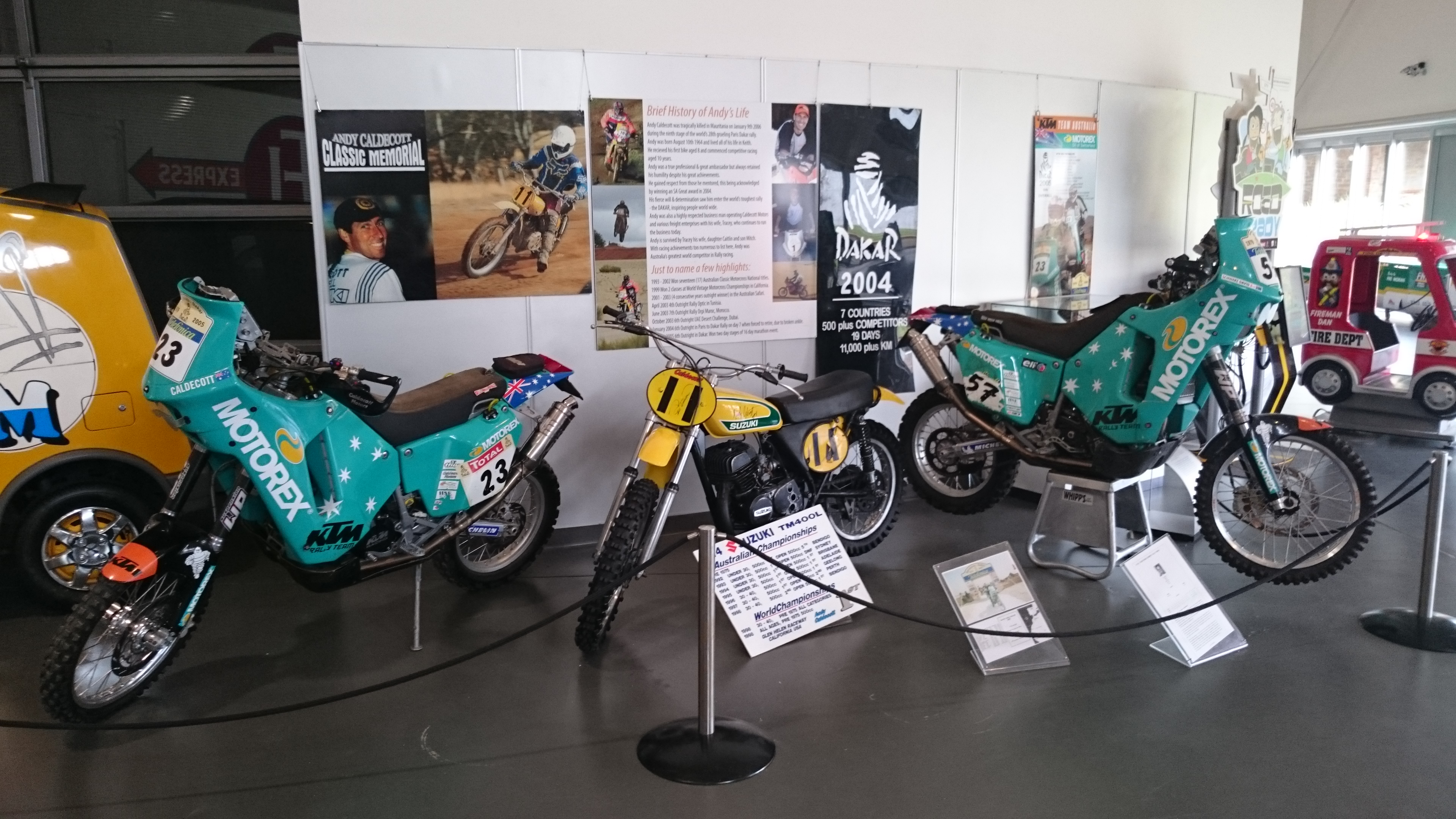
The Andy Caldecott display at the National Motor Museum, Birdwood, South Australia

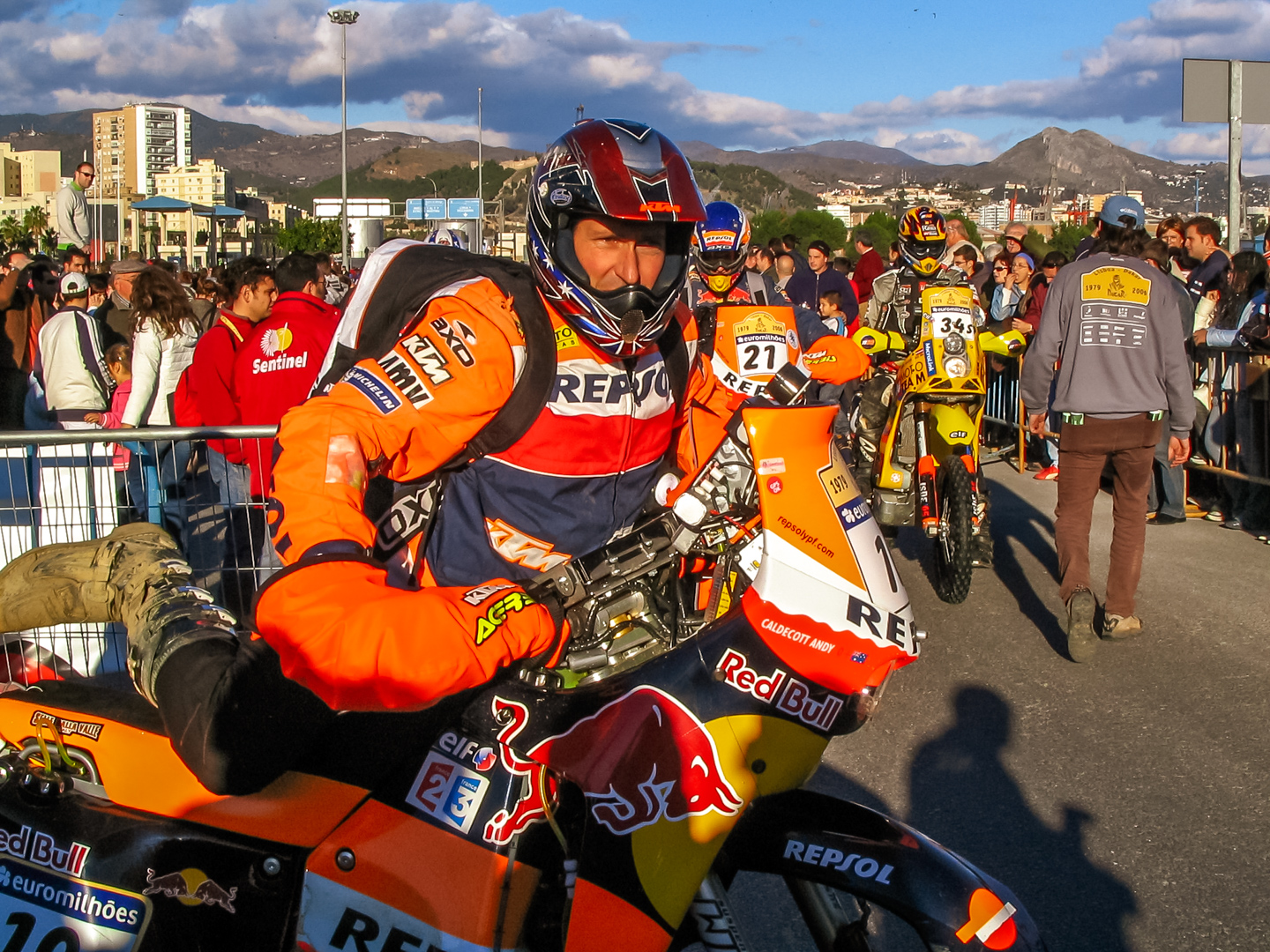
Andy Caldcott in Malaga on 1 January 2006 about to board the ferry to Africa.
