= Rallye des Pharaons =

Former rally-raid event

The Rallye des Pharaons (French for "Pharaohs Rally") was a rally-raid event that took place in Egypt between 1982 and 2015. Cairo was both the starting and finishing point at the foot of the pyramids of Giza, and the rally covered roughly around 3,100 kilometres (1,900 mi). It was similar in format to the Dakar Rally in that it took place in desert conditions and cars, trucks, and motorcycles were all permitted to compete.

== History ==
The first Pharaohs Rally was held in 1982 from an idea of Jean-Claude Morellet. In 1998 the organization was taken over by JVD, a company managed by Jacky Ickx, Vincenzo Lancia and Daniele Cotto, and the name was changed to Pharaons International Cross Country Rally.

The competition is valid for the FIM Cross-Country Rallies World Championship since 2000 and for the FIA Cross-Country Rally World Cup since 2005.

Tragedy struck on September 29, 2004, when three-time Dakar Rally winner Richard Sainct was killed when his motorcycle ran off the course. KTM, who Sainct rode for, pulled all other factory racers from the rest of the rally in respect for Sainct.

2015 marked the last year that the event was run due to difficulties in receiving support from the FIA and the Egyptian government. Rally des Pharaons restarted in 1998 after it wasn't held for 1 year in 1997 under the name of Rally of Egypt with joint organisation of Siag Travel with JVD and has stayed with this name in 1998-1999-2001-2002, and then JVD changed the name to Rally des Pharaons crosscountry.

== Winners ==
Year	Cars (driver / co-driver)	Motorcycles	Trucks (driver / co-driver)	Quads
1982	(France) André Trossat / Eric Briavoine	(Italy) Edi Orioli	–	–
1983	(France) Jean-Claude Briavoine / Catherine Plessis	(France) Patrick Drobecq	–	–
1984	(France) Christian Avril / Gérard Troublé	(Belgium) Gaston Rahier	–	–
1985	(Qatar) Saeed Al-Hajiri / (United Kingdom) John Spiller	(Belgium) Gaston Rahier	(Czech Republic) Kovář / Brzobohatý / (Switzerland) Héritier	–
1986	(Spain) Miguel Prieto / Ramon Termens	(Italy) Franco Picco	(Switzerland) Bonvin / Jacquerod / Missilliez	–
1987	(Finland) Ari Vatanen / (Sweden) Bruno Berglund	(Italy) Alessandro De Petri	(France) Groine / Ferri	–
1988	(Finland) Ari Vatanen / (Sweden) Bruno Berglund	(Belgium) Gaston Rahier	(Italy) Francesco Perlini / G. Belotti / Claudio Vinante	–
1989	(Finland) Ari Vatanen / (Sweden) Bruno Berglund	(Italy) Alessandro De Petri	Not held	–
1990	(France) Hubert Auriol / Philippe Monnet	(Italy) Alessandro De Petri	(France) Gueguen / Damereu	–
1991	(Finland) Ari Vatanen / (Sweden) Bruno Berglund	(United States) Danny LaPorte	(France) Pelichet / Pelichet / Musitelli	–
1992	(France) Jean-Louis Schlesser	(Italy) Franco Picco	(Italy) Maurizio Traglio / Del Prete	–
1993	(Finland) Timo Salonen / (United Kingdom) Fred Gallagher	(Italy) Edi Orioli	(Italy) Maurizio Traglio / Pio	–
1994	(France) Jean-Louis Schlesser	(Austria) Heinz Kinigadner	–	–
1995-97	Not held			
1998	(Italy) Giorgio Beccaris / Roberto Ferrari	(Italy) Fabrizio Meoni	–	–
1999	(Belgium) Gerard Marcy / Jean-Paul Cottret	(Italy) Fabrizio Meoni	–	–
2000	(Belgium) Grégoire De Mévius / (France) Alain Guehennec	(Italy) Fabrizio Meoni	–	–
2001	(Spain) José Luis Monterde / Rafael Tornabell	(Italy) Fabrizio Meoni	(Italy) Gilberto Sandretto / Corrado Pattono	–
2002	(Hungary) Balázs Szalay / Aladár Laklóth	(France) Richard Sainct	(Italy) Giuseppe Panseri / Giacomo Vismara / Marco Sangalli	–
2003	(France) Yves Loubet / Jacky Dubois	(Spain) Nani Roma	(Japan) Teruhito Sugawara / Masahiro Saiki	–
2004	(Belgium) Alain De Mevius / (France) Emmanuel Eggermont	(Norway) Pål Anders Ullevålseter	(Italy) Giacomo Vismara / Mario Cambiaghi	–
2005	(Belgium) Stéphane Henrard / Antonia De Roissard	(Spain) Marc Coma	(Italy) Giuseppe Panseri / Marco Piana / Oscar Mor	–
2006	(Russia) Sergey Shmakov / Konstantin Meshcheryakov	(Spain) Marc Coma	(Italy) Giacomo Vismara / Mario Cambiaghi / Paola Bellina	–
2007	(France) Christian Lavieille / François Borsotto	(Spain) Marc Coma	(Italy) Matteo Paccani / Attilio Brevi	–
2008	(France) Christian Lavieille / François Borsotto	(France) David Casteu	(Italy) Matteo Paccani / Attilio Brevi / Luca Baschenis	–
2009	(France) Jérôme Pélichet / Eugénie Decré	(France) Cyril Despres	Not held	(Italy) Camelia Liparioti
2010	(France) Jean-Louis Schlesser / Arnaud Debron	(Spain) Marc Coma	(Italy) Luisa Trucco / Corrado Pattono	(Argentina) Marcos Patronelli
2011	(France) Jean-Louis Schlesser / Arnaud Debron	(Spain) Marc Coma	(France) Marco Piana / Christophe Troesch / (Poland) Jarosław Kazberuk	(France) Lilian Lancelevee
2012	(United Arab Emirates) Khalifa Al Mutaiwei / (Germany) Andreas Schulz	(Spain) Joan Barreda Bort	Not held	(Poland) Lukasz Laskawiec
2013	Not held			
2014	(Saudi Arabia) Yazeed Al-Rajhi / (Germany) Timo Gottschalk	(Bolivia) Juan Carlos Salvatierra	Not held	(Poland) Rafal Sonik
2015	(Qatar) Nasser Al-Attiyah / (France) Mathieu Baumel	(Poland) Jakub Piątek	(Kazakhstan) Artur Ardavicius / Alexey Nikizhev / (Czech Republic) Jakub Hrava	(Qatar) Mohamed Abu Issa
