= Fabrizio Meoni =

Italian motorcycle racer

Personal information
- Born: 31 December 1957 Castiglion Fiorentino, Italy
- Died: 11 January 2005 (aged 47) Kiffa, Mauritania

Sport
- Country: Italy
- Sport: Motorsport
- Event: Rally raid
Medal record
Rally raid
Event	1st	2nd	3rd
Dakar Rally	2	1	2
Rally of Tunisia	4	1	0
Pharaons Rally	4	0	1
Total	10	2	3

Fabrizio Meoni (31 December 1957 – 11 January 2005) was an Italian off-road and rallying motorcycle racer. He was a member of the KTM Factory Team.

== Biography ==
Meoni was born in Castiglion Fiorentino, Italy. Meoni was married and had two children, Gioele and Chiara.

On May 22, 2021, Meoni's daughter Chiara died at the age of 18 after a serious illness.

== Career ==
Meoni won the Dakar Rally in 2001 and 2002. According to the rally's organizers, Meoni was considered "one of the greatest rally-raid champions ever". He also won the Rallye des Pharaons in 1998, 1999, 2000, and 2001.

== Death ==
Meoni died at age 47 near Kiffa, Mauritania, caused by a crash on 11 January 2005 on the 11th stage of the 2005 Dakar Rally. His official cause of death was cardiac arrest, according to his official website, although his injuries included cervical spine damage. Since the competitors did not want to continue racing the next day, the 12th stage of the rally was cancelled for all motorcycles in honor of Meoni. Jose Manuel Perez of Spain, another motorcyclist with the KTM Team, also died during the rally several days earlier. Meoni was "the 11th motorcyclist to die in the history of the gruelling race and the 45th competitor overall."

Sporting positions
Preceded by Richard Sainct	Dakar Rally; Motorcycle Winner; 2001–2002	Succeeded by Richard Sainct
