= 2002 Arras–Madrid–Dakar Rally =

Off-road motorsport event in Europe and Africa

2002 Dakar Rally
← Previous event	Next event →
- Host country: France; Spain; Morocco / (Sahrawi Arab Democratic Republic) Western Sahara; Mauritania; Senegal

Results
- Cars winner: (Japan) Hiroshi Masuoka (France) Pascal Maimon; Mitsubishi
- Bikes winner: (Italy) Fabrizio Meoni; KTM
- Trucks winner: (Russia) Vladimir Chagin (Russia) Semen Yakubov (Russia) Sergey Savostin; Kamaz

The 2002 Dakar Rally, also known as the 2002 Arras–Madrid–Dakar Rally, was the 24th running of the Dakar Rally event. The format of the rally was revised for 2002 with the introduction of two-day stages and two stages without the use of navigation aids. The race started in Arras in northern France on 28 December 2001 and finished at Dakar in Senegal on 13 January 2002. The 1999 and 2000 winner, Jean-Louis Schlesser, switched from a petrol powered vehicle to a diesel powered one in a bid to make the vehicle lighter However, he was forced to retire from the rally during the sixth stage from Er-Rachidia to Ouarzazate in Morocco while lying 11th overall when his vehicle caught fire. Japanese driver Hiroshi Masuoka took the lead at the sixth stage, and went on to win the rally. The motorcycle category was won by Fabrizio Meoni for the second successive year.

== Stages ==
Stage	Date	From	To	Total (km)	Stage winners		
Stage	Date	From	To	Total (km)	Bikes	Cars	Trucks
1	28 December	(France) Arras	(France) Châteauroux	465	Liaison only		
2	29 December	(France) Châteauroux	(France) Narbonne	598	(France) P. Quinonero	(Spain) F. Gil	Stage cancelled^{1}
3	30 December	(France) Narbonne	(Spain) Madrid	930	(France) R. Sainct	(Belgium) G. De Mévius	(Italy) C. Pattono
4	31 December	(Spain) Madrid	(Morocco) Rabat	961	(Spain) N. Roma	(Spain) F. Gil	Stage cancelled^{1}
5	1 January	(Morocco) Rabat	(Morocco) Er-Rachidia	534	(Chile) C. de Gavardo	(Japan) H. Masuoka	(Netherlands) J. de Rooy
6	2 January	(Morocco) Er-Rachidia	(Morocco) Ouarzazate	576	(Spain) J. Arcarons	(France) S. Peterhansel	(Russia) V. Chagin
7	3 January	(Morocco) Ouarzazate	(Morocco) Tan-Tan	793	(Chile) C. de Gavardo	(Japan) H. Masuoka	(Russia) V. Chagin
8	4 January	(Morocco) Tan-Tan	(Mauritania) Zouerat	739	(Italy) F. Meoni	(Japan) K. Shinozuka	(Russia) V. Chagin
9	5 January	(Mauritania) Zouerat	(Mauritania) Atar	396	(Finland) K. Tiainen	(Japan) H. Masuoka	(Russia) V. Chagin
	6 January	(Mauritania) Atar		Rest day			
10	7 January	(Mauritania) Atar		404	(South Africa) A. Cox	(Germany) J. Kleinschmidt	(Brazil) A. de Azevedo
11	8 January	(Mauritania) Atar	(Mauritania) Tidjikdja	502	(Chile) C. de Gavardo	(Japan) H. Masuoka	(Russia) V. Chagin
12	9 January	(Mauritania) Tidjikdja	(Mauritania) Tichit	538	(South Africa) A. Cox	(France) J-P. Fontenay	(Russia) V. Chagin
13	10 January	(Mauritania) Tichit		450	(Italy) G. Sala	(Japan) H. Masuoka	(Czech Republic) K. Loprais
14	11 January	(Mauritania) Tichit	(Mauritania) Kiffa	461	(Italy) F. Meoni	(Germany) J. Kleinschmidt	(Russia) V. Chagin
15	12 January	(Mauritania) Kiffa	(Senegal) Dakar	1011	(Portugal) B. Vilar	(Belgium) G. De Mévius	(Brazil) A. de Azevedo
16	13 January	(Senegal) Dakar		69	(Italy) G. Sala	(Belgium) G. De Mévius	(Brazil) A. de Azevedo

- ^1 - Stages cancelled for trucks due to poor weather conditions.

== Stage Results ==
=== Motorcycles ===
	Stage result					General classification				
Stage	Pos	Competitor	Make	Time	Gap	Pos	Competitor	Make	Time	Gap
1	Liaison only									
2	1	(France) Pierre Quinonero	KTM	6:12		1	(France) Pierre Quinonero	KTM	6:12	
2	2	(Finland) Kari Tiainen	KTM	6:17	0:05	2	(Finland) Kari Tiainen	KTM	6:17	0:05
2	3	(Spain) Nani Roma	KTM	6:27	0:15	3	(Spain) Nani Roma	KTM	6:27	0:15
3	1	(France) Richard Sainct	KTM	26:06		1	(France) Cyril Despres	KTM	32:38	
3	2	(France) Cyril Despres	KTM	26:10	0:04	1	(Spain) Nani Roma	KTM	32:38	
3	3	(Spain) Nani Roma	KTM	26:11	0:05	3	(Finland) Kari Tiainen	KTM	32:59	0:21
4	1	(Spain) Nani Roma	KTM	5:29		1	(Spain) Nani Roma	KTM	38:07	
4	2	(Finland) Kari Tiainen	KTM	5:38	0:09	2	(France) Cyril Despres	KTM	38:18	0:11
4	3	(France) Cyril Despres	KTM	5:40	0:11	3	(Finland) Kari Tiainen	KTM	38:37	0:30
5	1	(Chile) Carlo de Gavardo	KTM	42:38		1	(Finland) Kari Tiainen	KTM	1:23:47	
5	2	(South Africa) Alfie Cox	KTM	43:12	0:34	2	(South Africa) Alfie Cox	KTM	1:24:01	0:14
5	3	(Italy) Fabrizio Meoni	KTM	44:48	2:10	3	(Spain) Nani Roma	KTM	1:24:02	0:15
6	1	(Spain) Jordi Arcarons	KTM	3:40:58		1	(Spain) Nani Roma	KTM	5:05:48	
6	2	(Spain) Nani Roma	KTM	3:41:46	0:48	2	(Finland) Kari Tiainen	KTM	5:07:16	1:28
6	3	(Finland) Kari Tiainen	KTM	3:43:29	2:31	3	(Spain) Jordi Arcarons	KTM	5:08:19	2:31
7	1	(Chile) Carlo de Gavardo	KTM	3:33:03		1	(Spain) Nani Roma	KTM	8:42:32	
7	2	(Spain) Isidre Esteve	KTM	3:35:58	2:55	2	(Chile) Carlo de Gavardo	KTM	8:43:48	1:16
7	3	(Spain) Nani Roma	KTM	3:36:44	3:41	3	(South Africa) Alfie Cox	KTM	8:45:24	2:52
8	1	(Italy) Fabrizio Meoni	KTM	2:49:51		1	(Italy) Fabrizio Meoni	KTM	11:37:16	
8	2	(Chile) Carlo de Gavardo	KTM	2:56:56	7:05	2	(Spain) Nani Roma	KTM	11:40:23	3:07
8	3	(Spain) Nani Roma	KTM	2:57:51	8:00	3	(Chile) Carlo de Gavardo	KTM	11:40:44	3:28
9	1	(Finland) Kari Tiainen	KTM	4:14:54		1	(Italy) Fabrizio Meoni	KTM	16:02:00	
9	2	(Spain) Jordi Arcarons	KTM	4:18:01	3:07	2	(Chile) Carlo de Gavardo	KTM	16:03:53	1:53
9	3	(Spain) Isidre Esteve	KTM	4:19:43	4:49	3	(Spain) Nani Roma	KTM	16:04:02	2:02
10	1	(South Africa) Alfie Cox	KTM	4:08:10		1	(Italy) Fabrizio Meoni	KTM	20:10:16	
10	2	(Italy) Fabrizio Meoni	KTM	4:08:16	0:06	2	(Spain) Nani Roma	KTM	20:13:37	3:21
10	3	(Spain) Nani Roma	KTM	4:09:35	1:25	3	(Chile) Carlo de Gavardo	KTM	20:15:48	5:32
11	1	(Chile) Carlo de Gavardo	KTM	6:33:17		1	(Italy) Fabrizio Meoni	KTM	26:47:23	
11	2	(Spain) Nani Roma	KTM	6:35:12	1:55	2	(Spain) Nani Roma	KTM	26:48:49	1:26
11	3	(Italy) Fabrizio Meoni	KTM	6:37:07	3:50	3	(Chile) Carlo de Gavardo	KTM	26:49:05	1:42
12	1	(South Africa) Alfie Cox	KTM	6:30:39		1	(Italy) Fabrizio Meoni	KTM	33:19:08	
12	2	(Spain) Nani Roma	KTM	6:31:19	0:40	2	(Spain) Nani Roma	KTM	33:20:08	1:00
12	3	(Italy) Fabrizio Meoni	KTM	6:31:45	1:06	3	(South Africa) Alfie Cox	KTM	33:31:12	12:04
13	1	(Italy) Giovanni Sala	KTM	6:10:06		1	(Italy) Fabrizio Meoni	KTM	39:32:59	
13	2	(Italy) Fabrizio Meoni	KTM	6:13:51	3:45	2	(Spain) Nani Roma	KTM	39:36:02	3:03
13	3	(Spain) Isidre Esteve	KTM	6:14:48	4:12	3	(South Africa) Alfie Cox	KTM	39:49:18	16:19
14	1	(Italy) Fabrizio Meoni	KTM	6:22:22		1	(Italy) Fabrizio Meoni	KTM	45:55:21	
14	2	(France) Richard Sainct	KTM	6:25:07	2:45	2	(South Africa) Alfie Cox	KTM	46:41:10	45:49
14	3	(South Africa) Alfie Cox	KTM	6:51:52	29:30	3	(France) Richard Sainct	KTM	47:18:04	1:22:43
15	1	(Portugal) Bernardo Vilar	KTM	1:43:01		1	(Italy) Fabrizio Meoni	KTM	47:41:50	
15	2	(Italy) Giovanni Sala	KTM	1:43:34	0:33	2	(South Africa) Alfie Cox	KTM	48:28:42	47:52
15	3	(France) Richard Sainct	KTM	1:45:03	2:02	3	(France) Richard Sainct	KTM	49:03:07	1:21:17
16	1	(Italy) Giovanni Sala	KTM	17:45		1	(Italy) Fabrizio Meoni	KTM	48:00:59	
16	2	(Portugal) Paulo Manuel Marques	KTM	17:46	0:01	2	(South Africa) Alfie Cox	KTM	48:48:51	47:52
16	3	(Spain) Isidre Esteve	KTM	17:56	0:11	3	(France) Richard Sainct	KTM	49:21:24	1:20:25

=== Cars ===
	Stage result					General classification				
Stage	Pos	Competitor	Make	Time	Gap	Pos	Competitor	Make	Time	Gap
1	Liaison only									
2	1	(Spain) Fernando Gil (Spain) Rafael Tornabell	SEAT	6:43		1	(Spain) Fernando Gil (Spain) Rafael Tornabell	SEAT	6:43	
2	2	(Spain) Miguel Prieto (Spain) Jacinto Vidarte	Mitsubishi	7:09	0:26	2	(Spain) Miguel Prieto (Spain) Jacinto Vidarte	Mitsubishi	7:09	0:26
2	3	(France) Stéphane Peterhansel (France) Jean-Paul Cottret	Nissan	7:12	0:29	3	(France) Stéphane Peterhansel (France) Jean-Paul Cottret	Nissan	7:12	0:29
3	1	(Belgium) Grégoire De Mévius (France) Alain Guehennec	Nissan	24:22		1	(Belgium) Grégoire De Mévius (France) Alain Guehennec	Nissan	32:03	
3	2	(France) Jean-Louis Schlesser (Andorra) Henri Magne	Renault	25:18	0:56	2	(Germany) Jutta Kleinschmidt (Germany) Andreas Schulz	Mitsubishi	32:56	0:53
3	3	(Germany) Jutta Kleinschmidt (Germany) Andreas Schulz	Mitsubishi	25:19	0:57	3	(France) Stéphane Peterhansel (France) Jean-Paul Cottret	Nissan	33:14	1:11
4	1	(Spain) Fernando Gil (Spain) Rafael Tornabell	SEAT	5:48		1	(Belgium) Grégoire De Mévius (France) Alain Guehennec	Nissan	39:42	
4	2	(Brazil) Klever Kolberg (France) Pascal Larroque	Mitsubishi	5:55	0:07	2	(Spain) Fernando Gil (Spain) Rafael Tornabell	SEAT	39:56	0:14
4	3	(France) Bruno Saby (France) Jérôme Boussier	Ford	6:14	0:26	3	(France) Stéphane Peterhansel (France) Jean-Paul Cottret	Nissan	40:39	0:57
5	1	(Japan) Hiroshi Masuoka (France) Pascal Maimon	Mitsubishi	43:42		1	(Belgium) Grégoire De Mévius (France) Alain Guehennec	Nissan	1:23:55	
5	2	(Belgium) Grégoire De Mévius (France) Alain Guehennec	Nissan	44:13	0:31	2	(Japan) Hiroshi Masuoka (France) Pascal Maimon	Mitsubishi	1:24:28	0:33
5	3	(Germany) Jutta Kleinschmidt (Germany) Andreas Schulz	Mitsubishi	44:14	0:32	3	(France) Stéphane Peterhansel (France) Jean-Paul Cottret	Nissan	1:25:01	1:06
6	1	(France) Stéphane Peterhansel (France) Jean-Paul Cottret	Nissan	3:25:19^{1}		1	(Japan) Hiroshi Masuoka (France) Pascal Maimon	Mitsubishi	4:50:16	
6	2	(Japan) Kenjiro Shinozuka (France) Thierry Delli-Zotti	Mitsubishi	3:25:39	0:20	2	(Japan) Kenjiro Shinozuka (France) Thierry Delli-Zotti	Mitsubishi	4:52:20	2:04
6	3	(Japan) Hiroshi Masuoka (France) Pascal Maimon	Mitsubishi	3:25:48	0:29	3	(Belgium) Grégoire De Mévius (France) Alain Guehennec	Nissan	4:54:03	3:47
7	1	(Japan) Hiroshi Masuoka (France) Pascal Maimon	Mitsubishi	3:13:23		1	(Japan) Hiroshi Masuoka (France) Pascal Maimon	Mitsubishi	8:03:39	
7	2	(Belgium) Grégoire De Mévius (France) Alain Guehennec	Nissan	3:13:37	0:14	2	(Japan) Kenjiro Shinozuka (France) Thierry Delli-Zotti	Mitsubishi	8:07:04	3:25
7	3	(Japan) Kenjiro Shinozuka (France) Thierry Delli-Zotti	Mitsubishi	3:14:44	1:21	3	(Belgium) Grégoire De Mévius (France) Alain Guehennec	Nissan	8:07:40	4:01
8	1	(Japan) Kenjiro Shinozuka (France) Thierry Delli-Zotti	Mitsubishi	2:34:43		1	(Japan) Hiroshi Masuoka (France) Pascal Maimon	Mitsubishi	10:41:20	
8	2	(France) Jean-Pierre Fontenay (France) Gilles Picard	Mitsubishi	2:35:59	1:16	2	(Japan) Kenjiro Shinozuka (France) Thierry Delli-Zotti	Mitsubishi	10:41:47	0:27
8	3	(Belgium) Grégoire De Mévius (France) Alain Guehennec	Nissan	2:36:35	1:52	3	(Belgium) Grégoire De Mévius (France) Alain Guehennec	Nissan	11:02:15	20:55^{2}
9	1	(Japan) Hiroshi Masuoka (France) Pascal Maimon	Mitsubishi	3:53:39		1	(Japan) Hiroshi Masuoka (France) Pascal Maimon	Mitsubishi	14:34:59	
9	2	(Germany) Jutta Kleinschmidt (Germany) Andreas Schulz	Mitsubishi	3:58:44	5:05	2	(Japan) Kenjiro Shinozuka (France) Thierry Delli-Zotti	Mitsubishi	14:46:45	11:46
9	3	(France) Jean-Pierre Fontenay (France) Gilles Picard	Mitsubishi	4:01:54	8:15	3	(Germany) Jutta Kleinschmidt (Germany) Andreas Schulz	Mitsubishi	15:01:08	26:09
10	1	(Germany) Jutta Kleinschmidt (Germany) Andreas Schulz	Mitsubishi	3:46:12		1	(Japan) Hiroshi Masuoka (France) Pascal Maimon	Mitsubishi	18:26:45	
10	2	(Japan) Hiroshi Masuoka (France) Pascal Maimon	Mitsubishi	3:51:46	5:34	2	(Japan) Kenjiro Shinozuka (France) Thierry Delli-Zotti	Mitsubishi	18:38:54	12:09
10	3	(Japan) Kenjiro Shinozuka (France) Thierry Delli-Zotti	Mitsubishi	3:52:09	5:57	3	(Germany) Jutta Kleinschmidt (Germany) Andreas Schulz	Mitsubishi	18:47:20	20:35
11	1	(Japan) Hiroshi Masuoka (France) Pascal Maimon	Mitsubishi	6:04:33		1	(Japan) Hiroshi Masuoka (France) Pascal Maimon	Mitsubishi	24:31:18	
11	2	(Japan) Kenjiro Shinozuka (France) Thierry Delli-Zotti	Mitsubishi	6:10:13	5:40	2	(Japan) Kenjiro Shinozuka (France) Thierry Delli-Zotti	Mitsubishi	24:49:07	17:49
11	3	(Germany) Jutta Kleinschmidt (Germany) Andreas Schulz	Mitsubishi	6:14:55	10:22	3	(Germany) Jutta Kleinschmidt (Germany) Andreas Schulz	Mitsubishi	25:02:15	30:57
12	1	(France) Jean-Pierre Fontenay (France) Gilles Picard	Mitsubishi	6:32:44		1	(Japan) Hiroshi Masuoka (France) Pascal Maimon	Mitsubishi	31:10:41	
12	2	(Germany) Jutta Kleinschmidt (Germany) Andreas Schulz	Mitsubishi	6:34:23	1:39	2	(Germany) Jutta Kleinschmidt (Germany) Andreas Schulz	Mitsubishi	31:36:38	25:57
12	3	(Japan) Hiroshi Masuoka (France) Pascal Maimon	Mitsubishi	6:39:23	6:39	3	(Japan) Kenjiro Shinozuka (France) Thierry Delli-Zotti	Mitsubishi	31:39:59	29:18
13	1	(Japan) Hiroshi Masuoka (France) Pascal Maimon	Mitsubishi	6:37:10		1	(Japan) Hiroshi Masuoka (France) Pascal Maimon	Mitsubishi	37:47:51	
13	2	(France) Jean-Pierre Fontenay (France) Gilles Picard	Mitsubishi	6:41:51	4:41	2	(Japan) Kenjiro Shinozuka (France) Thierry Delli-Zotti	Mitsubishi	38:40:00	52:09
13	3	(Japan) Kenjiro Shinozuka (France) Thierry Delli-Zotti	Mitsubishi	7:00:01	22:51	3	(Germany) Jutta Kleinschmidt (Germany) Andreas Schulz	Mitsubishi	38:40:13	52:22
14	1	(Germany) Jutta Kleinschmidt (Germany) Andreas Schulz	Mitsubishi	5:50:05		1	(Japan) Hiroshi Masuoka (France) Pascal Maimon	Mitsubishi	44:11:50	
14	2	(Japan) Kenjiro Shinozuka (France) Thierry Delli-Zotti	Mitsubishi	6:07:05	17:00	2	(Germany) Jutta Kleinschmidt (Germany) Andreas Schulz	Mitsubishi	44:30:18	18:28
14	3	(France) Jean-Pierre Fontenay (France) Gilles Picard	Mitsubishi	6:21:55	31:50	3	(Japan) Kenjiro Shinozuka (France) Thierry Delli-Zotti	Mitsubishi	44:47:05	35:15
15	1	(Belgium) Grégoire De Mévius (France) Alain Guehennec	Nissan	1:33:06		1	(Japan) Hiroshi Masuoka (France) Pascal Maimon	Mitsubishi	45:48:08	
15	2	(Japan) Hiroshi Masuoka (France) Pascal Maimon	Mitsubishi	1:36:18	3:12	2	(Germany) Jutta Kleinschmidt (Germany) Andreas Schulz	Mitsubishi	46:10:09	22:01
15	3	(Japan) Kenjiro Shinozuka (France) Thierry Delli-Zotti	Mitsubishi	1:38:14	5:08	3	(Japan) Kenjiro Shinozuka (France) Thierry Delli-Zotti	Mitsubishi	46:25:19	37:11
16	1	(Belgium) Grégoire De Mévius (France) Alain Guehennec	Nissan	18:24		1	(Japan) Hiroshi Masuoka (France) Pascal Maimon	Mitsubishi	46:11:30	
16	2	(France) Laurent Bourgnon (France) Guy Leneveu	Nissan	20:50	2:26	2	(Germany) Jutta Kleinschmidt (Germany) Andreas Schulz	Mitsubishi	46:33:31	22:01
16	3	(Portugal) Carlos Sousa (Portugal) Victor Jesus	Mitsubishi	21:02	2:38	3	(Japan) Kenjiro Shinozuka (France) Thierry Delli-Zotti	Mitsubishi	46:46:45	35:15

- ^1 - Peterhansel received a 14-minute penalty for speeding in the liaison section.
- ^2 - De Mévius received an 18-minute penalty for failing to complete the liaison section in the allotted time.

=== Trucks ===
	Stage result					General classification				
Stage	Pos	Competitor	Make	Time	Gap	Pos	Competitor	Make	Time	Gap
1	Liaison only									
2	Stage cancelled due to poor conditions									
3	1	(Italy) Corrado Pattono (Italy) Guido Toni	Mercedes-Benz	32:07		1	(Italy) Corrado Pattono (Italy) Guido Toni	Mercedes-Benz	32:07	
3	2	(Russia) Vladimir Chagin (Russia) Semen Yakubov (Russia) Sergey Savostin	Kamaz	33:37	1:30	2	(Russia) Vladimir Chagin (Russia) Semen Yakubov (Russia) Sergey Savostin	Kamaz	33:37	1:30
3	3	(Italy) Paolo Barilla (Italy) Matteo Marzotto (Italy) Ferdinando Ravarotto	Mercedes-Benz	34:03	1:56	3	(Italy) Paolo Barilla (Italy) Matteo Marzotto (Italy) Ferdinando Ravarotto	Mercedes-Benz	34:03	1:56
4	Stage cancelled due to poor conditions^{1}									
5	1	(Netherlands) Jan de Rooy (Netherlands) Gérard de Rooy (Belgium) Yvo Geusens	DAF	58:42		1	(Russia) Vladimir Chagin (Russia) Semen Yakubov (Russia) Sergey Savostin	Kamaz	2:23:28	
5	2	(Russia) Vladimir Chagin (Russia) Semen Yakubov (Russia) Sergey Savostin	Kamaz	59:51	1:09	2	(Netherlands) Jan de Rooy (Netherlands) Gérard de Rooy (Belgium) Yvo Geusens	DAF	2:24:44	1:16
5	3	(Brazil) André de Azevedo (Czech Republic) Tomáš Tomeček (Czech Republic) Jaromír Martinec	Tatra	1:00:56	2:14	3	(Brazil) André de Azevedo (Czech Republic) Tomáš Tomeček (Czech Republic) Jaromír Martinec	Tatra	2:26:18	2:50
6	1	(Russia) Vladimir Chagin (Russia) Semen Yakubov (Russia) Sergey Savostin	Kamaz	4:36:15		1	(Russia) Vladimir Chagin (Russia) Semen Yakubov (Russia) Sergey Savostin	Kamaz	6:59:43	
6	2	(Brazil) André de Azevedo (Czech Republic) Tomáš Tomeček (Czech Republic) Jaromír Martinec	Tatra	5:11:18	35:03	2	(Brazil) André de Azevedo (Czech Republic) Tomáš Tomeček (Czech Republic) Jaromír Martinec	Tatra	7:37:36	37:53
6	3	(Austria) Peter Reif (Austria) Gunther Pichlbauer (Australia) Lee Palmer	MAN	5:17:25	41:10	3	(Austria) Peter Reif (Austria) Gunther Pichlbauer (Australia) Lee Palmer	MAN	7:44:22	44:39
7	1	(Russia) Vladimir Chagin (Russia) Semen Yakubov (Russia) Sergey Savostin	Kamaz	4:34:18		1	(Russia) Vladimir Chagin (Russia) Semen Yakubov (Russia) Sergey Savostin	Kamaz	11:34:01	
7	2	(Czech Republic) Karel Loprais (Czech Republic) Josef Kalina (Czech Republic) Petr Hamerla	Tatra	4:44:01	9:43	2	(Brazil) André de Azevedo (Czech Republic) Tomáš Tomeček (Czech Republic) Jaromír Martinec	Tatra	12:30:01	56:00
7	3	(Brazil) André de Azevedo (Czech Republic) Tomáš Tomeček (Czech Republic) Jaromír Martinec	Tatra	4:52:25	18:07	3	(Czech Republic) Karel Loprais (Czech Republic) Josef Kalina (Czech Republic) Petr Hamerla	Tatra	12:41:56	1:07:55
8	1	(Russia) Vladimir Chagin (Russia) Semen Yakubov (Russia) Sergey Savostin	Kamaz	3:16:47		1	(Russia) Vladimir Chagin (Russia) Semen Yakubov (Russia) Sergey Savostin	Kamaz	14:50:48	
8	2	(Czech Republic) Karel Loprais (Czech Republic) Josef Kalina (Czech Republic) Petr Hamerla	Tatra	3:26:09	9:22	2	(Brazil) André de Azevedo (Czech Republic) Tomáš Tomeček (Czech Republic) Jaromír Martinec	Tatra	15:56:23	1:05:35
8	3	(Brazil) André de Azevedo (Czech Republic) Tomáš Tomeček (Czech Republic) Jaromír Martinec	Tatra	3:26:22	9:35	3	(Czech Republic) Karel Loprais (Czech Republic) Josef Kalina (Czech Republic) Petr Hamerla	Tatra	16:08:05	1:17:17
9	1	(Russia) Vladimir Chagin (Russia) Semen Yakubov (Russia) Sergey Savostin	Kamaz	5:35:56		1	(Russia) Vladimir Chagin (Russia) Semen Yakubov (Russia) Sergey Savostin	Kamaz	20:26:44	
9	2	(Japan) Yoshimasa Sugawara (Japan) Naoko Matsumoto (Japan) Seiichi Suzuki	Hino	5:57:45	21:49	2	(Czech Republic) Karel Loprais (Czech Republic) Josef Kalina (Czech Republic) Petr Hamerla	Tatra	22:12:31	1:45:47
9	3	(Czech Republic) Karel Loprais (Czech Republic) Josef Kalina (Czech Republic) Petr Hamerla	Tatra	6:04:26	28:30	3	(Brazil) André de Azevedo (Czech Republic) Tomáš Tomeček (Czech Republic) Jaromír Martinec	Tatra	22:13:01	1:46:17
10	1	(Brazil) André de Azevedo (Czech Republic) Tomáš Tomeček (Czech Republic) Jaromír Martinec	Tatra	5:15:46		1	(Russia) Vladimir Chagin (Russia) Semen Yakubov (Russia) Sergey Savostin	Kamaz	25:52:22	
10	2	(Czech Republic) Karel Loprais (Czech Republic) Josef Kalina (Czech Republic) Petr Hamerla	Tatra	5:18:10	2:24	2	(Brazil) André de Azevedo (Czech Republic) Tomáš Tomeček (Czech Republic) Jaromír Martinec	Tatra	27:28:47	1:36:25
10	3	(Russia) Vladimir Chagin (Russia) Semen Yakubov (Russia) Sergey Savostin	Kamaz	5:25:38	9:52	3	(Czech Republic) Karel Loprais (Czech Republic) Josef Kalina (Czech Republic) Petr Hamerla	Tatra	27:30:41	1:38:19
11	1	(Russia) Vladimir Chagin (Russia) Semen Yakubov (Russia) Sergey Savostin	Kamaz	8:44:54		1	(Russia) Vladimir Chagin (Russia) Semen Yakubov (Russia) Sergey Savostin	Kamaz	34:37:16	
11	2	(Brazil) André de Azevedo (Czech Republic) Tomáš Tomeček (Czech Republic) Jaromír Martinec	Tatra	8:45:23	0:29	2	(Brazil) André de Azevedo (Czech Republic) Tomáš Tomeček (Czech Republic) Jaromír Martinec	Tatra	36:14:10	1:36:54
11	3	(Czech Republic) Karel Loprais (Czech Republic) Josef Kalina (Czech Republic) Petr Hamerla	Tatra	9:13:11	28:17	3	(Czech Republic) Karel Loprais (Czech Republic) Josef Kalina (Czech Republic) Petr Hamerla	Tatra	36:43:52	2:06:36
12	1	(Russia) Vladimir Chagin (Russia) Semen Yakubov (Russia) Sergey Savostin	Kamaz	9:26:34		1	(Russia) Vladimir Chagin (Russia) Semen Yakubov (Russia) Sergey Savostin	Kamaz	44:03:50	
12	2	(Czech Republic) Karel Loprais (Czech Republic) Josef Kalina (Czech Republic) Petr Hamerla	Tatra	10:04:48	38:14	2	(Brazil) André de Azevedo (Czech Republic) Tomáš Tomeček (Czech Republic) Jaromír Martinec	Tatra	46:27:04	2:23:14
12	3	(Brazil) André de Azevedo (Czech Republic) Tomáš Tomeček (Czech Republic) Jaromír Martinec	Tatra	10:12:54	46:20	3	(Czech Republic) Karel Loprais (Czech Republic) Josef Kalina (Czech Republic) Petr Hamerla	Tatra	46:48:40	2:44:50
13	1	(Czech Republic) Karel Loprais (Czech Republic) Josef Kalina (Czech Republic) Petr Hamerla	Tatra	9:24:04		1	(Russia) Vladimir Chagin (Russia) Semen Yakubov (Russia) Sergey Savostin	Kamaz	53:31:57	
13	2	(Russia) Vladimir Chagin (Russia) Semen Yakubov (Russia) Sergey Savostin	Kamaz	9:28:07	4:03	2	(Czech Republic) Karel Loprais (Czech Republic) Josef Kalina (Czech Republic) Petr Hamerla	Tatra	56:12:44	2:40:47
13	3	(Japan) Yoshimasa Sugawara (Japan) Naoko Matsumoto (Japan) Seiichi Suzuki	Hino	10:26:52	1:02:48	3	(Japan) Yoshimasa Sugawara (Japan) Naoko Matsumoto (Japan) Seiichi Suzuki	Hino	58:48:35	5:16:38
14	1	(Russia) Vladimir Chagin (Russia) Semen Yakubov (Russia) Sergey Savostin	Kamaz	9:12:39		1	(Russia) Vladimir Chagin (Russia) Semen Yakubov (Russia) Sergey Savostin	Kamaz	62:44:36	
14	2	(Austria) Peter Reif (Austria) Gunther Pichlbauer (Australia) Lee Palmer	MAN	9:41:07	28:28	2	(Czech Republic) Karel Loprais (Czech Republic) Josef Kalina (Czech Republic) Petr Hamerla	Tatra	66:46:55	4:02:19
14	3	(Japan) Yoshimasa Sugawara (Japan) Naoko Matsumoto (Japan) Seiichi Suzuki	Hino	10:04:17	51:38	3	(Japan) Yoshimasa Sugawara (Japan) Naoko Matsumoto (Japan) Seiichi Suzuki	Hino	68:52:52	6:08:16
15	1	(Brazil) André de Azevedo (Czech Republic) Tomáš Tomeček (Czech Republic) Jaromír Martinec	Tatra	2:00:21		1	(Russia) Vladimir Chagin (Russia) Semen Yakubov (Russia) Sergey Savostin	Kamaz	64:46:16	
15	2	(Russia) Vladimir Chagin (Russia) Semen Yakubov (Russia) Sergey Savostin	Kamaz	2:01:40	1:19	2	(Czech Republic) Karel Loprais (Czech Republic) Josef Kalina (Czech Republic) Petr Hamerla	Tatra	69:01:40	4:15:24
15	3	(Czech Republic) Karel Loprais (Czech Republic) Josef Kalina (Czech Republic) Petr Hamerla	Tatra	2:14:45	14:24	3	(Japan) Yoshimasa Sugawara (Japan) Naoko Matsumoto (Japan) Seiichi Suzuki	Hino	71:14:16	6:28:00
16	1	(Brazil) André de Azevedo (Czech Republic) Tomáš Tomeček (Czech Republic) Jaromír Martinec	Tatra	25:23		1	(Russia) Vladimir Chagin (Russia) Semen Yakubov (Russia) Sergey Savostin	Kamaz	65:12:14	
16	2	(Russia) Vladimir Chagin (Russia) Semen Yakubov (Russia) Sergey Savostin	Kamaz	25:58	0:35	2	(Czech Republic) Karel Loprais (Czech Republic) Josef Kalina (Czech Republic) Petr Hamerla	Tatra	69:35:19	4:23:05
16	3	(Italy) Paolo Barilla (Italy) Matteo Marzotto (Italy) Ferdinando Ravarotto	Mercedes-Benz	26:02	0:39	3	(Japan) Yoshimasa Sugawara (Japan) Naoko Matsumoto (Japan) Seiichi Suzuki	Hino	71:42:48	6:30:34

- ^1 - All competitors had their stage time set to 50:00.

== Final standings ==
=== Motorcycles ===
Pos	No.	Rider	Bike	Entrant	Time
1	1	(Italy) Fabrizio Meoni	KTM	KTM Factory Team	48:00:59
2	5	(South Africa) Alfie Cox	KTM	Gauloises KTM	+47:52
3	6	(France) Richard Sainct	KTM	Gauloises KTM	+1:20:25
4	3	(Chile) Carlo de Gavardo	KTM	Repsol KTM	+2:52:46
5	4	(Spain) Isidre Esteve	KTM	Repsol KTM	+2:54:34
6	7	(Italy) Giovanni Sala	KTM	Gauloises KTM	+4:02:47
7	2	(Spain) Jordi Arcarons	KTM	Repsol KTM	+4:47:17
8	12	(France) Eric Bernard	KTM		+5:14:32
9	65	(Norway) Pål Anders Ullevålseter	KTM		+6:11:22
10	15	(Portugal) Paulo Manuel Marques	KTM		+8:15:38

=== Cars ===
Pos	No.	Driver	Co-Driver	Car	Entrant	Time
1	201	(Japan) Hiroshi Masuoka	(France) Pascal Maimon	Mitsubishi	Team Nippon Oil Mitsubishi Ralliart	46:11:30
2	200	(Germany) Jutta Kleinschmidt	(Germany) Andreas Schulz	Mitsubishi	Team Mitsubishi Ralliart	+22:01
3	210	(Japan) Kenjiro Shinozuka	(France) Thierry Delli-Zotti	Mitsubishi	Team Nippon Oil Mitsubishi Ralliart	+35:15
4	207	(France) Jean-Pierre Fontenay	(France) Gilles Picard	Mitsubishi	Team Mitsubishi Ralliart	+1:37:30
5	204	(Portugal) Carlos Sousa	(Portugal) Victor Jesus	Mitsubishi	Mitsubishi Galp TMN Chesterfield Team	+5:20:57
6	241	(Qatar) Saeed Al-Hajri	(United Kingdom) Matthew Stevenson	Mitsubishi	MMC Qatar Rally	+8:24:51
7	216	(France) Luc Alphand	(France) Arnaud Debron	Mitsubishi	Ralliart France	+10:40:02
8	225	(Brazil) Klever Kolberg	(France) Pascal Larroque	Mitsubishi	Team BR Lubrax	+12:21:09
9	239	(France) Jean-Jacques Ratet	(France) Jean-Pierre Garcin	Toyota	Toyota Team Araco	+15:48:03
10	249	(France) Nicolas Misslin	(France) Jean-Michel Polato	Mitsubishi	NCM Ralliart France	+18:04:22

=== Trucks ===
Pos	No.	Driver	Co-Drivers	Truck	Time
1	409	(Russia) Vladimir Chagin	(Russia) Semen Yakubov (Russia) Sergey Savostin	Kamaz	65:12:14
2	408	(Czech Republic) Karel Loprais	(Czech Republic) Josef Kalina (Czech Republic) Petr Hamerla	Tatra 815	+4:23:05
3	400	(Japan) Yoshimasa Sugawara	(Japan) Naoko Matsumoto (Japan) Seiichi Suzuki	Hino	+6:30:34
4	415	(Austria) Peter Reif	(Austria) Gunther Pichlbauer (Australia) Lee Palmer	MAN	+7:17:30
5	414	(France) Jean-Paul Bosonnet	(France) Serge Lacourt (France) Roger Darroux	Mercedes-Benz	+11:59:42
6	410	(Netherlands) Jan de Rooy	(Netherlands) Gérard de Rooy (Belgium) Yvo Geusens	DAF	+14:30:51
7	435	(Austria) Helmut Kropfel	(Austria) Hermann Anzini (Austria) Ronald Bormann	MAN	+17:19:05
8	403	(Italy) Paolo Barilla	(Italy) Matteo Marzotto (Italy) Ferdinando Ravarotto	Mercedes-Benz	+19:33:06
9	401	(Italy) Corrado Pattono	(Italy) Guido Toni	Mercedes-Benz	+23:28:22
10	411	(Brazil) André de Azevedo	(Czech Republic) Tomáš Tomeček (Czech Republic) Jaromír Martinec	Tatra	+23:40:34
