= 1983 Rallye des Pharaons =

← Previous event	Next event →
- Host country: Egypt

Results
- Cars winner: (France) Jean-Claude Briavoine; Lada Niva
- Bikes winner: (France) Patrick Drobecq; Honda

The 1983 Rallye des Pharaons was run in Egypt.

== Cars ==
#	Driver	Co-driver	Car
1st place, gold medalist(s)	(France) Jean-Claude Briavoine	(France) Catherine Plessis	Lada Niva
2nd place, silver medalist(s)	(France) André Trossat	(France) Eric Briavoine	Lada Niva
3rd place, bronze medalist(s)	(France) Pierre Lartigue	(France) Jean-Charles Djaoui	Lada Niva

== Bikes ==
#	Driver	Bike
1st place, gold medalist(s)	(France) Patrick Drobecq	Honda 600 XR
