= Chris Blais =

American motorcycle racer

Christopher Blais (born 3 January 1981) is an off-road racing rider from Apple Valley, California. Blais was the top American Rookie and ninth overall finisher of the 2005 race, fourth overall finisher in 2006, and third overall of the 2007 Dakar Rally riding a KTM 690 Rally motorcycle.

== Crash ==
Blais was severely injured Sunday August 5, 2007 while pre-running for the Vegas to Reno race. He crashed off his bike and suffered a broken collarbone and, more severe, a crushed T-7 vertebra in his back. This injury has left him unable to walk and with very little feeling from the waist down.

== Honors ==
Results	Tournament or trophy
Highlights	9th overall 2005 Dakar Rally Barcelona, Spain 4th overall 2006 Dakar Rally; 3rd overall 2007 Dakar Rally 4th overall 2005 Tunisia Rally; 1st overall 2005 Motorcycle San Felipe 250, Mexico; 4th overall 2005 Motorcycle Baja 500 Mexico; 2nd place 2005 Parker 250, United States; 2nd place 2005 Terrible's Town 250, USA; 4th overall 2005 Nevada 1000, United States; 2nd overall 2003 Baja 1000, as highlighted in the Dust To Glory Movie

== References and external links ==
- Chris Blais personal page
- Chris Blais online store
- Article by Dirt Rider on solo Baja 1000
- Chris Blais' brother Nick Blais racing site
