= Richard Sainct =

French motorcycle racer

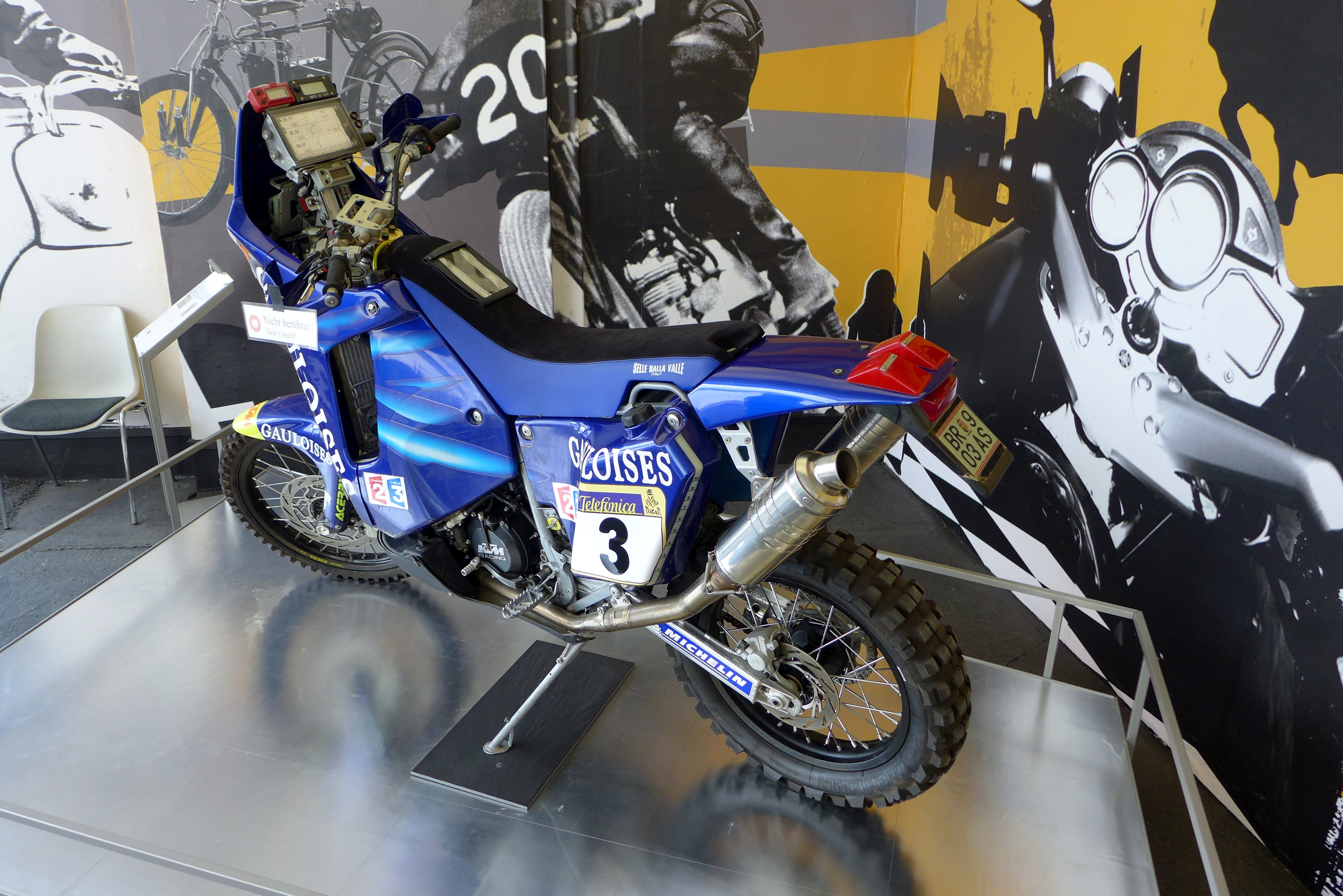
- KTM 660 Rally ridden by Richard Sainct to victory of the 2003 Dakar Rally

Personal information
- Born: 14 April 1970 Saint-Affrique, France
- Died: 29 September 2004 (aged 34) Egypt

Sport
- Country: France
- Sport: Motorsport
- Event: Rally raid

Achievements and titles
- World finals: 1 World Championship
Medal record
Rally raid
Event	1st	2nd	3rd
Dakar Rally	3	1	1
Rally of Tunisia	2	-	-
Rallye du Maroc	4	-	-
Pharaons Rally	1	-	-
Total	10	1	1

Richard Sainct (14 April 1970 – 29 September 2004) was a French rally raid motorcycle rider, best known for his three victories on The Paris-Dakar rally in 1999, 2000 and 2003.

== Biography ==
Sainct's other notable achievements include winning the Tunisia Rally twice in 1998 and 1999; the Moroccan Rally in 1997, 1998, 2001 and 2002; and the Pharaons Rally in 2002. He also won the FIM Rally Raid World Cup in 2002.

== Death ==
Sainct was killed on 29 September 2004 on the fourth stage of the Pharaons Rally in Egypt, Sainct fell and was assisted by the Italian teammate Fabrizio Meoni, who helped him get up and be honest with his condition. To the Tuscan who helped him, Sainct seemed in a light confusion, but insisted on wanting to leave. He resumed the race, with no apparent problems, and stopped at the assistance expected after 211 km of the race.

After 270 kilometers of stage, Sainct was the victim of a second fall and was found on the ground and already devoid of life. The heartbeat seemed absent when the rescue helicopter intervened with a doctor on board. Probably, in the first fall, Sainct reported some internal injury. The KTM decided to withdraw all its bikes from the race, but the race director, the former Belgian driver Jacky Ickx, decided to continue the race.

== Rally Dakar ==
Sainct won 15 stages in his rally raid participations, the complete results are in the Dakar Historic Book.

Year	Bike	Rank	Stages
1991	Kawasaki	Ret.	0
1995	Honda	Ret.	0
1996	KTM LC4	6th	0
1997	KTM LC4	Ret.	0
1998	KTM LC4	Ret.	1
1999	BMW F650 RR	1st	2
2000	BMW F650 RR	1st	2
2001	KTM LC4 660R	Ret.	2
2002	KTM LC4 660R	3rd	1
2003	KTM LC4 660R	1st	5
2004	KTM LC4 660R	2nd	2

Sporting positions
Preceded by Stéphane Peterhansel	Dakar Rally; Motorcycle Winner; 1999–2000	Succeeded by Fabrizio Meoni
Preceded by Fabrizio Meoni	Dakar Rally; Motorcycle Winner; 2003	Succeeded by Nani Roma
