= Giovanni Sala =

Italian motorcycle racer

Giovanni Sala (born 23 November 1963) is an Italian enduro rider and a six-time World Enduro Champion (including the overall world championship title in 1998). He is also a four-time winner of the International Six Days Enduro (ISDE) World Trophy with Team Italy (in 1992, 1994, 1997 and 2000), and was the fastest overall in the competition in 1992, 1996 and 1997.

Sala competed his whole world championship career with KTM. He won his first title in the 500 cc class in 1993, and went on to take the 250 cc two-stroke titles in 1994, 1995 and 1998. In 1999, he won his final WEC title in the 400 cc world championship. Sala retired from the World Enduro Championship after the 2004 season, but has continued competing in the Italian Enduro Championship, where he has won several titles, and in the motorcycle class of the Dakar Rally. At the 2006 Dakar, Sala finished third. In 2011, Sala was named an FIM Legend for his motorcycling achievements. In 2024 Sala designed the track for the Bibione Sand Storm.

== Career summary ==
Season	Series	Class	Team	Wins	Final placing
1991	World Enduro Championship	250 cc	KTM	2	3rd
1992	World Enduro Championship	500 cc	KTM	7	2nd
1993	World Enduro Championship	500 cc	KTM	9	1st
1994	World Enduro Championship	250 cc	KTM	7	1st
1995	World Enduro Championship	250 cc	KTM	7	1st
1996	World Enduro Championship	250 cc	KTM	4	2nd
1997	World Enduro Championship	250 cc	KTM	3	2nd
1998	World Enduro Championship	250 cc	KTM	5	1st
1999	World Enduro Championship	400 cc	KTM	6	1st
2000	World Enduro Championship	250 cc	KTM	0	4th
2001	World Enduro Championship	250 cc	KTM	0	5th
2002	World Enduro Championship	500 cc	KTM	0	4th
2003	World Enduro Championship	250 cc	KTM	2	2nd
2004	World Enduro Championship	E2	KTM	0	8th

=== ISDE ===
Season	Location	Class	Team	Final placing
1991	Považská Bystrica, Czechoslovakia	World Trophy	Italy	14th
1992	Cessnock, Australia	World Trophy	Italy	1st
1993	Assen, Netherlands	World Trophy	Italy	14th
1994	Tulsa, United States	World Trophy	Italy	1st
1996	Hämeenlinna, Finland	World Trophy	Italy	2nd
1997	Brescia, Italy	World Trophy	Italy	1st
1998	Traralgon, Australia	World Trophy	Italy	4th
1999	Coimbra, Portugal	World Trophy	Italy	2nd
2000	Granada, Spain	World Trophy	Italy	1st
2001	Brive-la-Gaillarde, France	World Trophy	Italy	2nd
2003	Fortaleza, Brazil	World Trophy	Italy	2nd
2004	Kielce, Poland	World Trophy	Italy	2nd
