= Jean-Claude Olivier =

French motorcycle racer and team president

- Born: 28 February 1945; Croix, Nord, France
- Died: 12 January 2013 (aged 67); Wancourt, Pas-de-Calais, France
- Relatives: Gonzague Olivier (father)

Jean-Claude Olivier (28 February 1945 – 12 January 2013), often referred to simply as "JCO", was a French motorcycle racer and president of Yamaha Motor France S.A. from 1992 to 2010. He helped launch the careers of many famous French riders including Patrick Pons, Christian Sarron and Stéphane Peterhansel. He was a veteran of nine editions of the Dakar Rally, placing second in the motorcycle category in 1985.

== Career ==
=== Employment at Sonauto ===
Olivier's father Gonzague had enjoyed a successful career racing Porsche sportscars during the 1950s, and became great friends with regular co-driver Auguste Veuillet. Veuillet had founded the company Sonauto in 1947 and went on to become the first major importer of Porsche road cars to France. Jean-Claude Olivier joined the company in 1965 after his father recommended him to Veuillet for a position, and he was tasked with establishing Sonauto as France's first Yamaha motorcycle importer. He drove a van around France with a selection of motorcycles in the back, which he demonstrated to potential stockists, and soon established a network of Yamaha dealers. His business connections enabled him to organise a photo shoot with Brigitte Bardot riding a Yamaha AT1 in 1971, gaining much publicity for the brand.

In addition, Olivier oversaw Sonauto's participation in Grand Prix motorcycle racing, where it was active between 1976 and 1991. The team won the 250cc championship in 1984 and took a premier-class race victory in 1985 with their longtime rider Christian Sarron.

The Yamaha VMAX, introduced in 1985, was originally designated solely for the North American Market. However, Olivier immediately recognised the potential popularity of a powerful naked bike in Europe and arranged for it to be homologated for the Continent. To drum up interest, he convinced a friend to spend the summer cruising on a VMAX around fashionable locations across the South of France and, by the end of this campaign, 30 orders had already been placed. The bike was made available in France in 1986 and, by the end of the 1990s, sales in France were higher than in North America.

=== Rally raid career ===
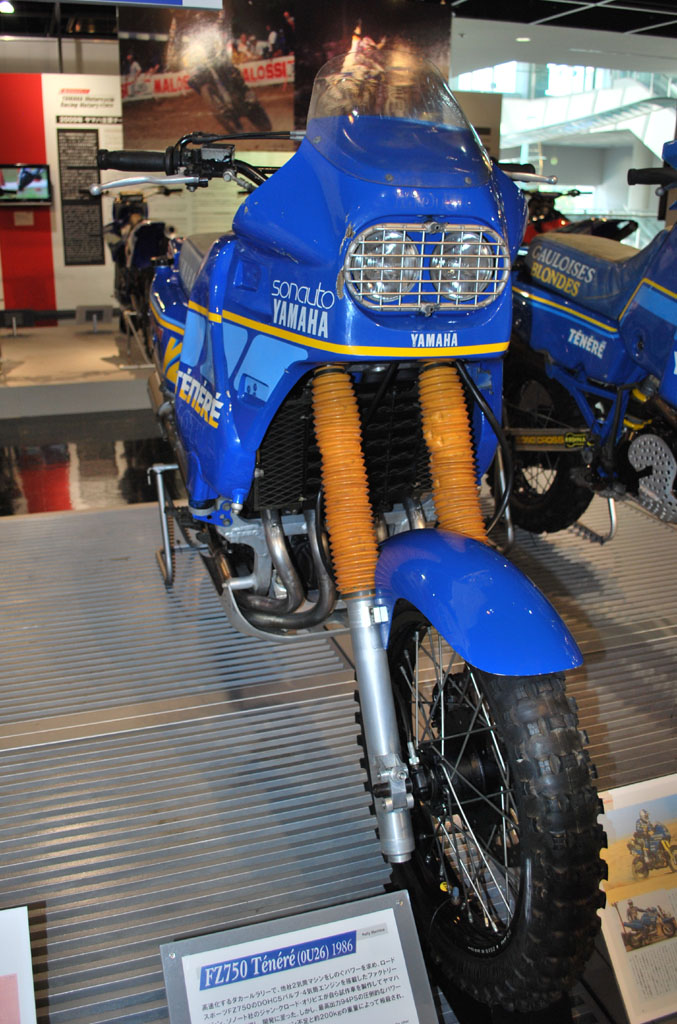
The Yamaha FZ750 Ténéré designed and raced by Olivier in the 1986 Dakar Rally.

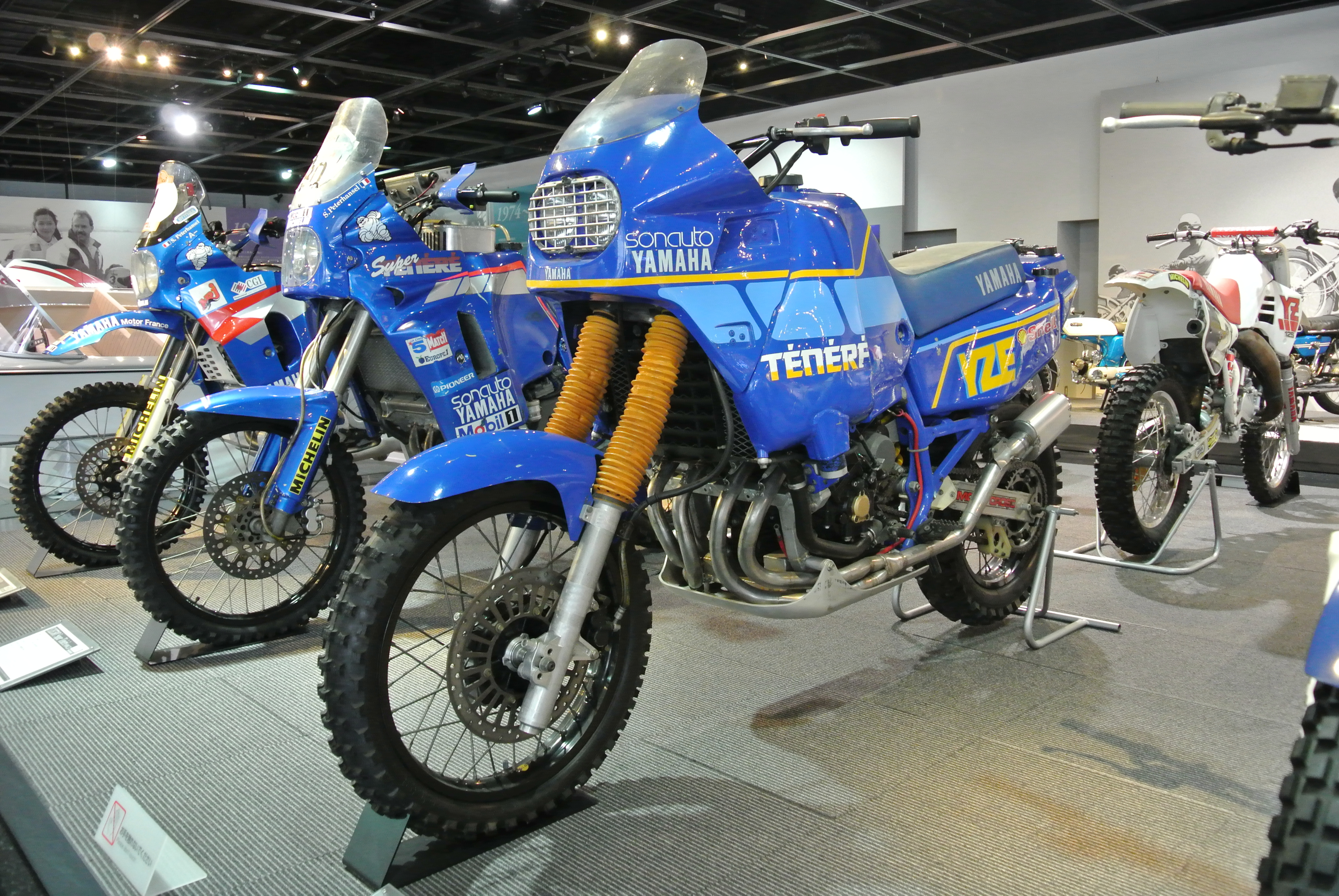
Olivier's 1986 FZ750 Ténéré (right) next to Stéphane Peterhansel's winning motorcycles from 1991 (centre) and 1995 (left).

Olivier's racing experience includes participations in the Bol d'Or at Montlhéry in 1969 and 1970. His first cross-country rally was the 1977 Abidjan-Nice Rally.

Sonauto brought four Yamaha XT500s to the inaugural Dakar Rally in 1979, to be ridden by Gilles Comte, Christian Rayer, Rudy Potisek and Olivier. Between them, the riders won 7 of the 11 stages in the motorcycle category and placed second and eighth overall with Comte and Rayer respectively. Olivier himself won the final leg of the third stage and won the fourth stage, but collided with the Range Rover of Christophe Neveu in the following special stage. He fractured his wrist and was forced to withdraw from the event.

Yamaha's Dakar Rally wins in 1979 and 1980 were followed by a lean period. For 1984, Olivier and Sonauto aided in the development of the Yamaha XT600 Ténéré, named after the region of the Sahara. This was a production motorcycle but featured upgrades that made it more suited to rally competitions. For 1985, Sonauto helped the brand produce their first prototype motorcycle built specifically for the event, a modified version of the XT600 Ténéré. Olivier led a 2-3-4 finish in the motorcycle category. Later that year, he took part in the Pharaohs Rally but suffered a fall and fractured several bones.

Despite their upturn in form, Olivier felt that Yamaha needed a more powerful engine to remain competitive, with average speeds increasing every year. He lobbied the managers of Yamaha Japan to develop a more potent two-cylinder engine but was unsuccessful. At the same time, the brand's new four-cylinder FZ750 motorcycle was proving both powerful and reliable. Undeterred, Olivier obtained an FZ750 engine and fitted it to an XT600 frame, creating a prototype known as the Yamaha FZ750 Ténéré. The model was promising in testing and Olivier gained full support from the factory to develop it. The motorcycle boasted 94 bhp, considerably more than their competitors, but weighed a hefty 197 kg and struggled for traction on sand. This negated its competitive edge and Olivier only managed 12th in the 1986 Dakar Rally.

For 1988, Olivier brought André Malherbe, a three-time Motocross World Champion, and young rider Stéphane Peterhansel to the rally, but this edition proved tough. Malherbe suffered a serious accident that broke his neck and left him paralysed. Olivier was the first to come across the scene of the accident. He stopped to give first aid, and attracted the attention of the rescue crew by setting fire to Malherbe's motorcycle. He only left the scene to continue his own rally at Malherbe's urging. Olivier himself fell and broke his arm later in the rally, but continued to ride and finished the event 7th overall. This performance served as inspiration for Peterhansel:

"...(The rally) was not easy but after (Olivier finished) I said, Mr. Olivier is really a strong man, not only with his speed when riding but also (mentally) because to finish the Dakar like that with an arm broken, for me it was not possible. It was during my first Dakar so I was really impressed about his (ability); he was really strong, never (gave up) and was always (pushing his physical limits)."

Olivier also competed 25 times in the Enduro du Touquet, an Enduro competition held on the beach and sand dunes in Le Touquet. The event typically features up to 1000 starters, but he managed to finish in the top-20 on 15 occasions and recorded a best result of second.

=== President of Yamaha France ===
In 1992, Yamaha ended their association with Sonauto and promoted Olivier to president of Yamaha Motor France S.A., a role he held until he retired in 2010. He oversaw Yamaha's most successful era in the Dakar Rally, winning the event every year under his tenure (except 1994) until the brand decided not to continue following the 1998 event. He was instrumental in convincing Yamaha to return to Dakar in 2004, when David Frétigné took three stage wins and placed 7th in the final classification. Since then, the brand has been entered to every edition as of 2023.

=== Death ===
Olivier died in a traffic accident on 12 January 2013. He was driving on the A1 in Wancourt when, at 11:15 a.m., his car was hit head-on by a heavy goods vehicle which had wandered into his lane, killing him instantly. His daughter, who was in the car with him at the time, escaped with only minor injuries. At the time of his death, Yamaha were leading the motorcycle classification in the 2013 Dakar Rally.

== Racing record ==
=== Dakar Rally ===
Year	Class	Vehicle	Position	Stages won
1979	Motorbike	(Japan) Yamaha	DNF	2
1980	Did not enter			
1981	Did not enter			
1982	Did not enter			
1983	Motorbike	(Japan) Yamaha	7th	0
1984	Motorbike	(Japan) Yamaha	6th	0
1985	Motorbike	(Japan) Yamaha	2nd	0
1986	Motorbike	(Japan) Yamaha	12th	0
1987	Motorbike	(Japan) Yamaha	11th	0
1988	Motorbike	(Japan) Yamaha	7th	0
1989	Did not enter			
1990	Did not enter			
1991	Did not enter			
1992	Did not enter			
1993	Did not enter			
1994	Did not enter			
1995	Motorbike	(Japan) Yamaha	9th	0
1996	Motorbike	(Japan) Yamaha	DNF	0
