= Yoshimasa Sugawara =

Retired Japanese rally driver

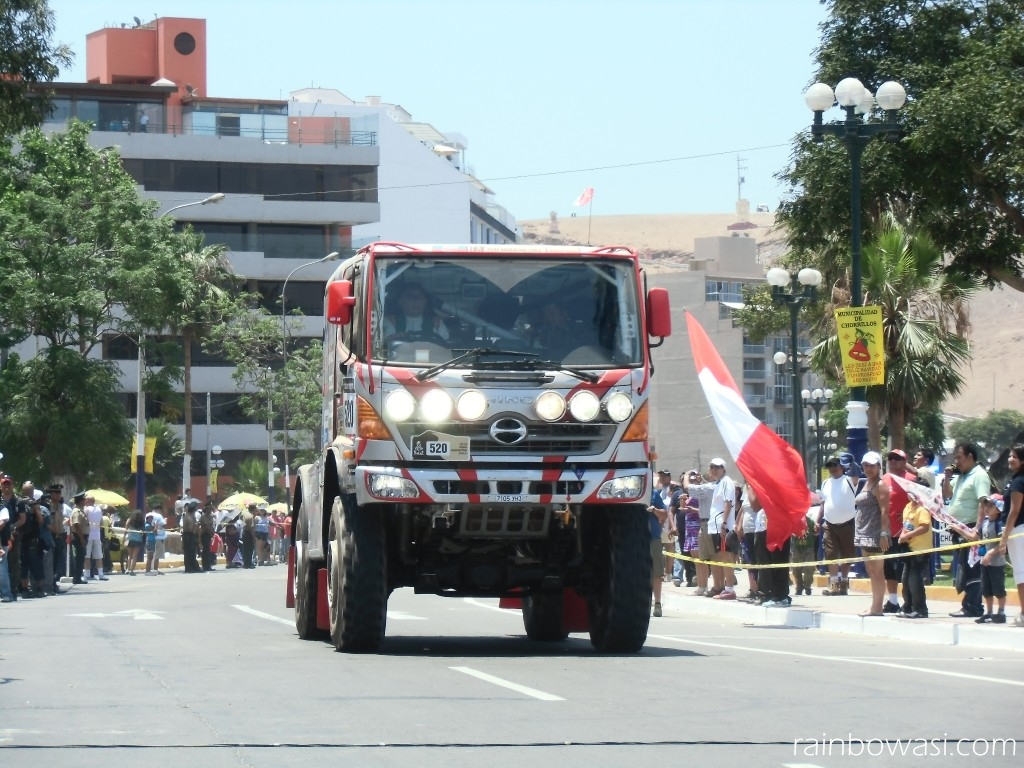
- Yoshimasa Sugawara at the 2013 Dakar Rally
- Born: 31 May 1941 (age 85) Otaru, Japan
- Current team: Hino Motors

Yoshimasa Sugawara (菅原 義正, Sugawara Yoshimasa; born 31 May 1941) is a retired Japanese rally driver, having been on the podium seven times at the Dakar Rally in the trucks category.

Sugawara has competed in 36 Dakar Rally competitions as of the 2019 edition, which he participated in at the age of 77. In 2017, he was mentioned in Guinness World Records for racing the most consecutive Dakar Rallies. His entry has since been updated to reflect his current record of 36.

== Dakar Rally results ==
Year	Class	Vehicle	Position	Stages won
1983	Motorbike	(Japan) Honda	DNF	0
1984	Motorbike	(Japan) Honda	DNF	0
1985	Cars	(Japan) Mitsubishi	DNF	0
1986	Cars	(Japan) Mitsubishi	33rd	0
1987	Cars	(Japan) Mitsubishi	87th	0
1988	Cars	(Japan) Mitsubishi	DNF	0
1989	Cars	(Japan) Mitsubishi	27th	0
1990	Cars	(Japan) Mitsubishi	26th	0
1991	Cars	(Japan) Mitsubishi	22nd	0
1992	Trucks	(Japan) HINO	6th	0
1993	Trucks	(Japan) HINO	6th	0
1994	Trucks	(Japan) HINO	2nd	0
1995	Trucks	(Japan) HINO	2nd	0
1996	Trucks	(Japan) HINO	6th	0
1997	Trucks	(Japan) HINO	2nd	0
1998	Trucks	(Japan) HINO	2nd	3
1999	Trucks	(Japan) HINO	4th	2
2000	Trucks	(Japan) HINO	5th	0
2001	Trucks	(Japan) HINO	2nd	0
2002	Trucks	(Japan) HINO	3rd	0
2003	Trucks	(Japan) HINO	5th	0
2004	Trucks	(Japan) HINO	5th	0
2005	Trucks	(Japan) HINO	2nd	0
2006	Trucks	(Japan) HINO	5th	0
2007	Trucks	(Japan) HINO	13th	0
2008	Event cancelled – replaced by the 2008 Central Europe Rally			
2009	Trucks	(Japan) HINO	26th	0
2010	Trucks	(Japan) HINO	DNF	0
2011	Trucks	(Japan) HINO	13th	0
2012	Trucks	(Japan) HINO	24th	0
2013	Trucks	(Japan) HINO	31st	0
2014	Trucks	(Japan) HINO	32nd	0
2015	Trucks	(Japan) HINO	32nd	0
2016	Trucks	(Japan) HINO	31st	0
2017	Trucks	(Japan) HINO	27th	0
2018	Trucks	(Japan) HINO	DNF	0
2019	Trucks	(Japan) HINO	DNF	0

== Africa Eco Race results ==
Year	Class	Vehicle	Position
2020	SSV Xtreme Race	(Japan) Yamaha	15
2022	SSV Xtreme Race	(Japan) Yamaha	9
2024	Open	(Japan) Suzuki	2
2026	Open	(Japan) Suzuki	13
