= Karel Loprais =

Czech rally raid driver (1949–2021)

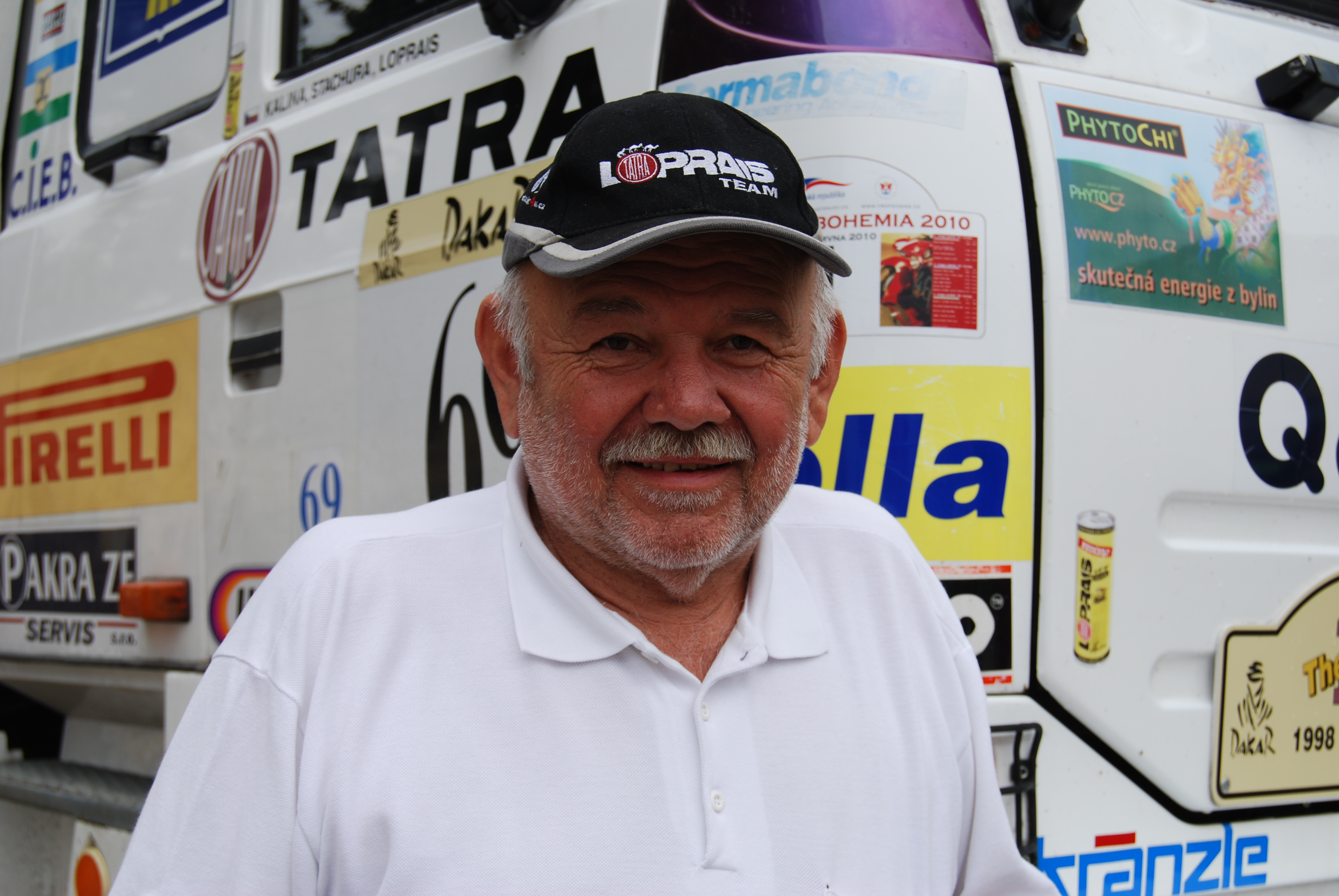
- Karel Loprais
- Nationality: Czech
- Born: 4 March 1949 Ostrava, Czechoslovakia
- Died: 30 December 2021 (aged 72) Nový Jičín, Czech Republic
- Relatives: Aleš Loprais (nephew)
- Debut season: 1986
- Current team: Tatra

Karel Loprais (4 March 1949 – 30 December 2021) was a Czech rally raid driver and six-time winner of the Dakar Rally in the truck category.

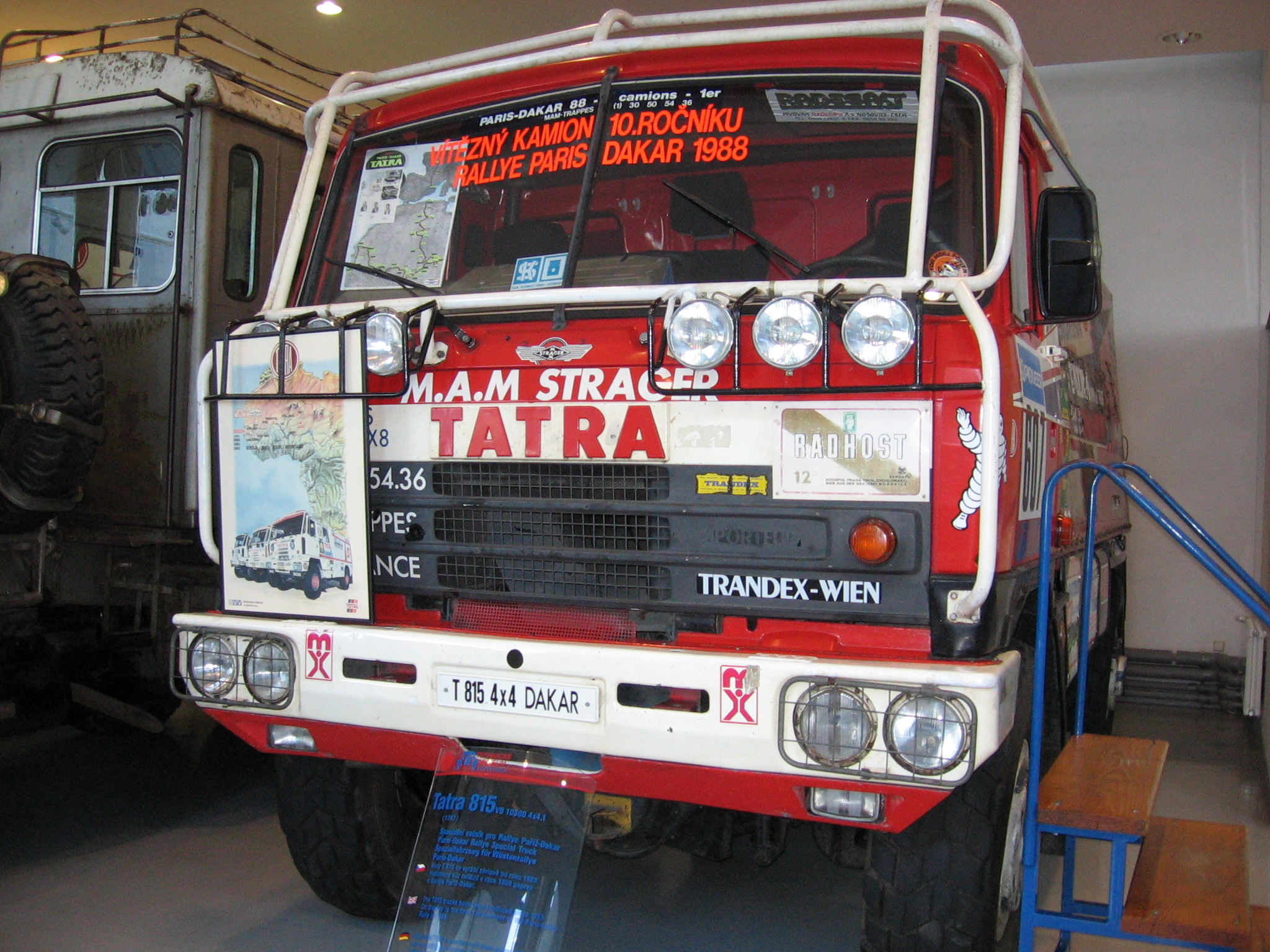
Tatra 815 4x4 - The 1988 rally winner in the Koprivnice Technical Museum

== Career ==
He started working in Tatra, Kopřivnice, Czechoslovakia, as a factory worker in 1967, later becoming a test driver. He competed with a Tatra 815 truck in the Dakar Rally for the first time in 1986, being disqualified from the 2nd place for arriving late to the last stage start. He competed 19 times between 1986-2006 and claimed six titles (1988, 1994, 1995, 1998, 1999, 2001), four second places (1987, 1996, 2000, 2002), one third place (1992), two fourth places (1990, 1991) and one seventh place (2004).

After his second victory in 1994, when he placed at the 6th place in the common auto-camion category some media started to call him Monsieur Dakar.

After the Dakar Rally he took part in the Paris-Moscow-Beijing rally in 1993 (3rd place), the Master Rallye in 1995 (4th place) and the UAE Desert Challenge in 1999 (3rd place) and 2000 (2nd place).

== Personal life and death ==
Loprais was the uncle of Aleš Loprais who is also a rally raid truck driver. Loprais died from COVID-19 at a hospital in Nový Jičín on 30 December 2021, aged 72.

== Dakar Rally results ==
Year	Class	Vehicle	Position	Stages won
1986	Trucks	(Czechoslovakia) Tatra	DNF	-
1987	Trucks	(Czechoslovakia) Tatra	2nd	-
1988	Trucks	(Czechoslovakia) Tatra	1st	-
1989	Trucks category not held.			
1990	Trucks	(Czechoslovakia) Tatra	4th	-
1991	Trucks	(Czechoslovakia) Tatra	4th	-
1992	Trucks	(Czechoslovakia) Tatra	3rd	-
1993				
1994	Trucks	(Czech Republic) Tatra	1st	-
1995	Trucks	(Czech Republic) Tatra	1st	-
1996	Trucks	(Czech Republic) Tatra	2nd	-
1997	Trucks	(Czech Republic) Tatra	DNF	-
1998	Trucks	(Czech Republic) Tatra	1st	-
1999	Trucks	(Czech Republic) Tatra	1st	1
2000	Trucks	(Czech Republic) Tatra	2nd	3
2001	Trucks	(Czech Republic) Tatra	1st	8
2002	Trucks	(Czech Republic) Tatra	2nd	1
2003	Trucks	(Czech Republic) Tatra	DNF	1
2004	Trucks	(Czech Republic) Tatra	7th	2
2005	Trucks	(Czech Republic) Tatra	DNF	0
2006	Trucks	(Czech Republic) Tatra	DNF	0

Sporting positions
Preceded by Jan de Rooy	Dakar Rally; Truck Winner; 1988	Succeeded by Giorgio Villa (1990)
Preceded by Francesco Perlini	Dakar Rally; Truck Winner; 1994–1995	Succeeded by Viktor Moskovskikh
Preceded by Peter Reif	Dakar Rally; Truck Winner; 1998–1999	Succeeded by Vladimir Chagin
Preceded by Vladimir Chagin	Dakar Rally; Truck Winner; 2001	Succeeded by Vladimir Chagin
