= Kenjiro Shinozuka =

Japanese rally driver (1948–2024)

Personal information
- Nationality: (Japan) Japanese
- Born: 20 November 1948; Ōta, Tokyo, Japan
- Died: 18 March 2024 (aged 75); Suwa, Nagano, Japan

World Rally Championship record
- Years active: 1976–1977, 1981, 1988–1994, 1996–1997
- Co-driver: (United Kingdom) Bob Graham (Kenya) Quentin Thomson (United States) Ron Richardson (United Kingdom) Bryan Harris (Lithuania) Fred Gocentas (United Kingdom) John Meadows (Finland) Pentti Kuukkala
- Teams: Mitsubishi Motors
- Rallies: 20
- Rally wins: 2
- Podiums: 3
- Stage wins: 3
- Total points: 88
- First rally: 1976 Safari Rally
- First win: 1991 Rallye Côte d'Ivoire
- Last win: 1992 Rallye Côte d'Ivoire
- Last rally: 1997 Rally Australia

Kenjiro Shinozuka (篠塚 建次郎, Shinozuka Kenjirō; November 20, 1948 – March 18, 2024) was a Japanese rally driver. After his debut in 1967, his greatest successes were as a works driver for Mitsubishi Motors.

Behind the wheel of a Galant VR-4, Shinozuka won the Asia-Pacific Rally Championship in 1988 and scored consecutive victories in the Rallye Côte d'Ivoire Bandama in 1991 and 1992, when it was a round of the World Rally Championship, making him the first Asian and Japanese competitor to win a WRC event. He was also of note for his success in the Dakar Rally, where he became the first Japanese winner of the world's most famous endurance rally in 1997 driving a Mitsubishi Pajero.

Shinozuka resigned from Mitsubishi in 2002, but continued to compete. He drove a Nissan pickup in the 2003 Dakar, but after hitting a sand dune he rolled his vehicle several times, enduring severe facial injuries and being placed in a coma. His co-driver Thierry Delli-Zotti suffered fractures to both his legs, although unlike Shinuzoka his injuries were not life-threatening.

Shinuzoka announced before the 2006 event that it would be his final appearance as a competitor, saying "[m]y decision has been taken: it’s my last Dakar. But I still hope to enjoy myself one last time behind the steering wheel. To win? No, that’s not my goal. After that, I don’t yet know what I’ll do but I do know that we need new talents in Japan. Just look at our drivers, they're all sixty or over, like Asaga san or Sugawara san… So I might help out in finding new promising competitors for the future." However, despite this, he returned for the 2007 Dakar, again driving a Nissan, and finished in 59th place out of the 109 cars that finished the race.

Shinozuka died of pancreatic cancer at a hospital in Suwa City, Nagano Prefecture, on March 18, 2024. He was 75.

== WRC victories ==
#	Event	Season	Co-driver	Car
1	(Ivory Coast) 23ème Rallye Côte d'Ivoire Bandama	1991	John Meadows	Mitsubishi Galant VR-4
2	(Ivory Coast) 24ème Rallye Côte d'Ivoire Bandama	1992	John Meadows	Mitsubishi Galant VR-4

== Dakar Rally results ==
Year	Class	Vehicle	Result	Stages
1986	Car	(Japan) Mitsubishi	46th	0
1987	Car	(Japan) Mitsubishi	3rd	1
1988	Car	(Japan) Mitsubishi	2nd	0
1989	Car	(Japan) Mitsubishi	6th	1
1990	Car	(Japan) Mitsubishi	5th	2
1991	Car	(Japan) Mitsubishi	DNF	1
1992	Car	(Japan) Mitsubishi	3rd	1
1993	Car	(Japan) Mitsubishi	5th	0
1994	Car	(Japan) Mitsubishi	DNF	0
1995	Car	(Japan) Mitsubishi	3rd	0
1996	Car	(Japan) Mitsubishi	17th	1
1997	Car	(Japan) Mitsubishi	1st	3
1998	Car	(Japan) Mitsubishi	2nd	4
1999	Car	(Japan) Mitsubishi	4th	3
2000	Car	(Japan) Mitsubishi	DNF	1
2001	Car	(Japan) Mitsubishi	30th	0
2002	Car	(Japan) Mitsubishi	3rd	1
2003	Car	(Japan) Nissan	DNF	1
2004	Car	(Japan) Nissan	DNF	1
2005	Car	(Japan) Nissan	DNF	0
2006	Car	(Japan) Nissan	DNF	0
2007	Car	(Japan) Nissan	59th	0

Sporting positions
Preceded by inaugural	Asia-Pacific Rally Champion; 1989	Succeeded by Rod Millen
Preceded by Pierre Lartigue	Dakar Rally; Car Winner; 1997	Succeeded by Jean-Pierre Fontenay
