= Nani Roma =

Spanish rally racing driver

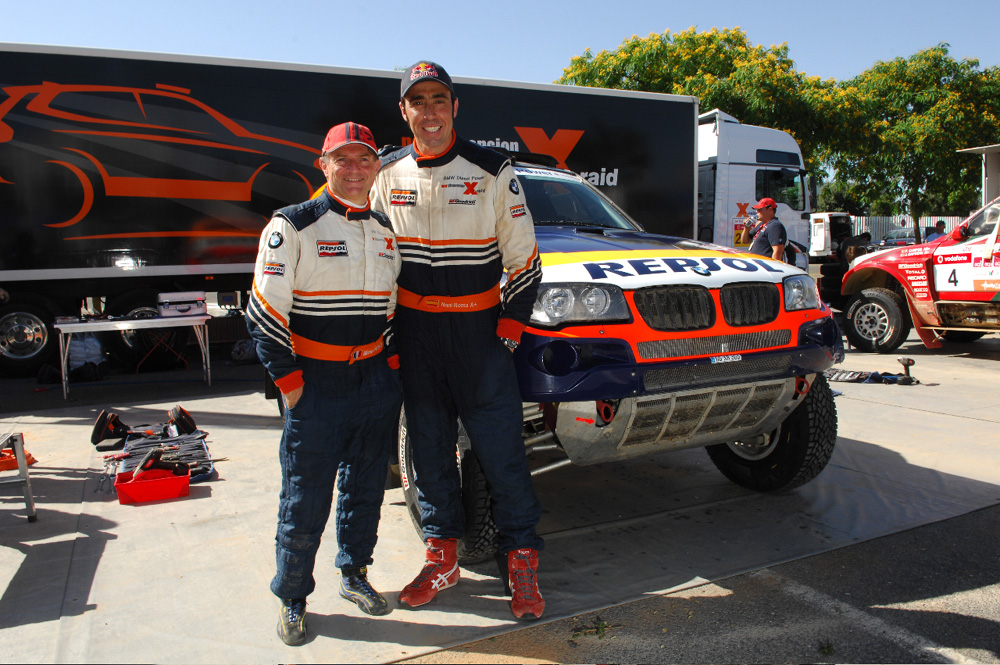
- Roma (right) with co-driver Michel Périn, 2009
- Full name: Joan Roma Cararach
- Born: 17 February 1972 (age 54) Folgueroles, Barcelona, Spain

Dakar Rally career
- Debut season: 1996
- Current team: X-Raid
- Former teams: KTM, BMW, Mitsubishi
- Championships: 2004 Dakar Rally (motorcycle), 2014 Dakar Rally (cars)

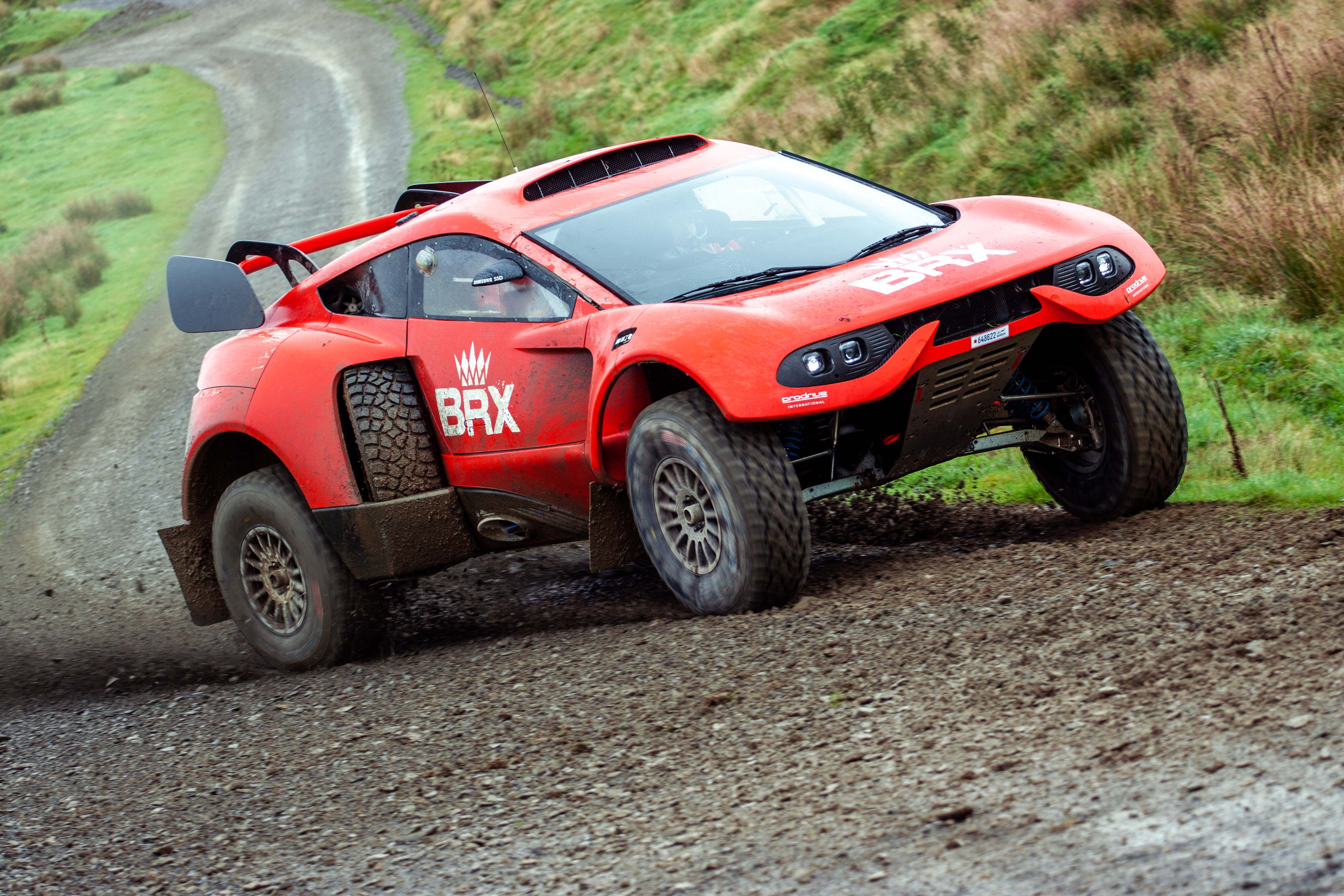
Nani Roma testing the BRX Prodrive Hunter T1+ in October 2021

Joan "Nani" Roma Cararach (born 17 February 1972) is a rally racing driver from Folgueroles, Barcelona, Spain. He won the Dakar Rally riding a motorcycle in 2004. Since then, he has entered the car category, taking the win in the 2014 edition of the race. In 2021, he was part of the BRX Prodrive Hunter team.

== Honours ==
Year	Event
1991	2nd in the Rallies Cross Country Junior Spanish Championship 125 cc
1992	5th in the Rallies Cross Country Senior European Championship 125 cc
1993	4th in the Rallies Cross Country Senior Spanish Championship Bronze medal in the International Six Days Enduro (ISDE)
1994	1st in the Rallies Cross Country Senior European Championship Golden medal in the ISDE; 4th in the Rallies Cross Country Senior Spanish Championship
1995	2nd in the Rallies Cross Country 4T Spanish Championship Bronze medal in the ISDE
1996	3rd in the Rallies Cross Country 4T Spanish Championship 2nd in the Rallies Cross Country 4T World Championship; 1st participation in the Dakar Rally
1997	1st in the Rallies Cross Country Spanish Championship 1st in the Raids Spanish Championship
1999	Golden medal in the ISDE 2nd in the Raid of Egypt; 2nd in the Rally of Dubai; 1st in the Baja Aragón and Baja Italia
2000	Bronze medal in the ISDE
2001	Bronze medal in the ISDE 2nd in the Baja Aragón
2002	1st in the Rally of Tunisia 1st in the Baja Aragón
2003	2nd in the Baja Aragón 3rd in the FIM Cup of TT Rallies; 3rd in the Rally of Tunisia; 3rd in the Rally of Morocco; 1st in the Rally of Egypt; 1st in the Rally of Sardinia
2004	1st in the Clermont-Ferrand–Dakar Rally (motorcycle) 2nd in the Rally of Sardinia
2005	6th in the Barcelona–Dakar Rally (car) 4th in the Rally of Patagonia-Atacama; 4th in the Rally of Morocco; 1st in the Baja Aragón
2006	3rd in 2006 Dakar Rally (car)
2009	1st in the Baja Aragón
2012	2nd in 2012 Dakar Rally (car)
2013	1st in Gymkhana Grid
2014	1st in 2014 Dakar Rally (car)
2019	2nd in 2019 Dakar Rally (car)
2020	27th in the 2020 Dakar Rally (car)
2021	5th in the 2021 Dakar Rally (car)

== Dakar results ==
Year	Class	Vehicle	Position	Stages won
1996	Bike	(Austria) KTM	DNF	0
1997	Bike	(Austria) KTM	DNF	0
1998	Bike	(Austria) KTM	DNF	1
1999	Bike	(Austria) KTM	DNF	1
2000	Bike	(Austria) KTM	17th	4
2001	Bike	(Germany) BMW	DNF	3
2002	Bike	(Austria) KTM	DNF	1
2003	Bike	(Austria) KTM	DNF	1
2004	Bike	(Austria) KTM	1st	2
2005	Car	(Japan) Mitsubishi	6th	0
2006	Car	(Japan) Mitsubishi	3rd	0
2007	Car	(Japan) Mitsubishi	13th	0
2008	Event cancelled – replaced by the 2008 Central Europe Rally			
2009	Car	(Japan) Mitsubishi	10th	1
2010	Car	(Germany) BMW	DNF	1
2011	Car	(Japan) Nissan	DNF	0
2012	Car	(United Kingdom) Mini	2nd	3
2013	Car	(United Kingdom) Mini	4th	4
2014	Car	(United Kingdom) Mini	1st	2
2015	Car	(United Kingdom) Mini	DNF	1
2016	Car	(United Kingdom) Mini	6th	0
2017	Car	(Japan) Toyota	4th	0
2018	Car	(United Kingdom) Mini	DNF	0
2019	Car	(United Kingdom) Mini	2nd	0
2020	Car	(Germany) Borgward	27th	0
2021	Car	(United Kingdom) Prodrive	5th	0
2022	Car	(United Kingdom) Prodrive	52nd	0
2023	did not enter			
2024	Car	(United States) Ford	44th	0
2025	Car	(United States) Ford	42nd	1
2026	Car	(United States) Ford	2nd	1

Sporting positions
Preceded by Richard Sainct	Dakar Rally; Motorcycle Winner; 2004	Succeeded by Cyril Despres
Preceded by Stéphane Peterhansel	Dakar Rally; Car Winner; 2014	Succeeded by Nasser Al-Attiyah
