= Stéphane Peterhansel =

French rally racer

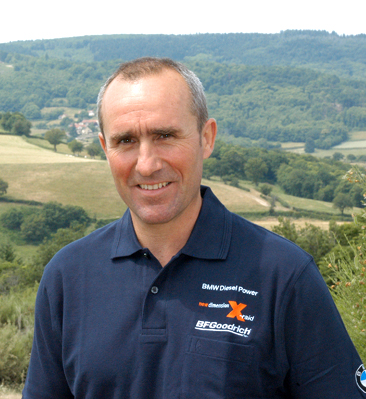
- Nationality: (France) French
- Born: 6 August 1965 (age 61) Échenoz-la-Méline, France

Dakar Rally career
- Debut season: 1988
- Current team: Defender Rally
- Championships: Dakar Rally
- Wins: 14

Stéphane Peterhansel (born 6 August 1965) is a rally driver from France. He holds the record for wins at the Dakar Rally, with 14 victories. He currently drives for Land Rover Defender Rally Team.

== Biography ==
Peterhansel made his Paris to Dakar Rally debut in 1988 in the motorcycle category for Yamaha, later winning the event in 1991, 1992, 1993, 1995, 1997, and 1998. He switched to the car category for 1999, joining the works Mitsubishi in 2003. He went on to win the event for the Japanese marque in 2004, 2005 and 2007. He took his tenth victory in 2012 driving an X-Raid prepared Mini Countryman and his 11th in 2013 for the same team, making him the most successful competitor in the history of the Dakar Rally. In 2014, he was leading the Dakar in the final stage, but was controversially ordered to allow his team-mate, Nani Roma, to overtake and win - leaving himself to finish in second place. In 2015, he joined Peugeot as the manufacturer returned to compete in the Dakar for the first time since 1990. He took his 12th and 13th Dakar victory in 2016 and 2017. He competed in the Race of Champions in 2005 and 2006 and is also a two-time World Enduro Champion. From 1999 to 2018, his Dakar co-driver was Jean-Paul Cottret.

He also competed in the 2018 Rallye du Maroc in the UTV category with a Yamaha YXZ with his wife Andrea Mayer as his co-driver.

Since the 2018 Baja Portalegre 500, Peterhansel and Cyril Despres have swapped their co-drivers, making David Castera as Peterhansel's co-driver and Cottret the co-driver for Despres.

=== Touring Car Racing ===
In 2002, Peterhansel tried his luck in the French Touring Car Championship in a Nissan Primera. He peaked with sixth at Dijon.

=== Dakar Rally ===
Year	Class	Vehicle	Position	Stages won
1988	Motorbike	(Japan) Yamaha	18th	1
1989	Motorbike	(Japan) Yamaha	4th	6
1990	Motorbike	(Japan) Yamaha	DSQ	1
1991	Motorbike	(Japan) Yamaha	1st	1
1992	Motorbike	(Japan) Yamaha	1st	4
1993	Motorbike	(Japan) Yamaha	1st	3
1994	Did not enter			
1995	Motorbike	(Japan) Yamaha	1st	4
1996	Motorbike	(Japan) Yamaha	DNF	3
1997	Motorbike	(Japan) Yamaha	1st	7
1998	Motorbike	(Japan) Yamaha	1st	3
1999	Cars	(Japan) Nissan	7th	0
2000	Cars	(France) Mega	2nd	2
2001	Cars	(Japan) Nissan	12th	0
2002	Cars	(Japan) Nissan	DNF	1
2003	Cars	(Japan) Mitsubishi	3rd	6
2004	Cars	(Japan) Mitsubishi	1st	2
2005	Cars	(Japan) Mitsubishi	1st	4
2006	Cars	(Japan) Mitsubishi	4th	3
2007	Cars	(Japan) Mitsubishi	1st	0
2008	not held			
2009	Cars	(Japan) Mitsubishi	DNF	0
2010	Cars	(Germany) BMW	4th	4
2011	Cars	(Germany) BMW	4th	1
2012	Cars	(United Kingdom) Mini	1st	3
2013	Cars	(United Kingdom) Mini	1st	2
2014	Cars	(United Kingdom) Mini	2nd	4
2015	Cars	(France) Peugeot	11th	0
2016	Cars	(France) Peugeot	1st	3
2017	Cars	(France) Peugeot	1st	3
2018	Cars	(France) Peugeot	4th	3
2019	Cars	(United Kingdom) Mini	DNF	2
2020	Cars	(United Kingdom) Mini	3rd	4
2021	Cars	(United Kingdom) Mini	1st	1
2022	Cars	(Germany) Audi	DNF	1
2023	Cars	(Germany) Audi	DNF	0
2024	Cars	(Germany) Audi	30th	1
2025	Did not enter			
2026	Cars	(United Kingdom) Land Rover	4th	

== Other honours ==
Year	Event
1992	Paris-Moscow-Beijing Rally Motorcycle
1996	UAE Desert Challenge – Motorcycle
1998	24 Hours of Chamonix
2002	Tunisia Rally
2002	UAE Desert Challenge – Car
2003	UAE Desert Challenge – Car
2004	Tunisia Rally
2004	Morocco Rally
2005	UAE Desert Challenge – Car
2007	UAE Desert Challenge – Car
2019	Abu Dhabi Desert Challenge – Car
2019	FIA World Cup for Cross-Country Rallies – Car

Sporting positions
Preceded by Edi Orioli	Dakar Rally; Motorcycle Winner; 1991–1993	Succeeded by Edi Orioli
Preceded by Edi Orioli	Dakar Rally; Motorcycle Winner; 1995	Succeeded by Edi Orioli
Preceded by Edi Orioli	Dakar Rally; Motorcycle Winner; 1997–1998	Succeeded by Richard Sainct
Preceded by Hiroshi Masuoka	Dakar Rally; Car Winner; 2004–2005	Succeeded by Luc Alphand
Preceded by Luc Alphand	Dakar Rally; Car Winner; 2007	Succeeded by Giniel de Villiers
Preceded by Nasser Al-Attiyah	Dakar Rally; Car Winner; 2012–2013	Succeeded by Nani Roma
Preceded by Nasser Al-Attiyah	Dakar Rally; Car Winner; 2016–2017	Succeeded by Carlos Sainz
Preceded by Carlos Sainz	Dakar Rally; Car Winner; 2021	Succeeded by Nasser Al-Attiyah
