= Adiri =

Adiri may refer to:

- Adiri, Libya, a town in Libya
- Adiri (Titan), a region on Saturn's moon Titan
- people with the name:
  - Jonathan Adiri (born 1982), Israeli entrepreneur
  - Niv Adiri, Israeli sound engineer
