= Loprais =

Loprais is a surname. Notable people with the surname include:

- Aleš Loprais (born 1980), Czech rally raid driver, nephew of Karel
- Karel Loprais (1949–2021), Czech rally raid driver, uncle of Aleš
