= 1998 Paris–Granada–Dakar Rally =

Off-road motorsport event in Europe and Africa

1998 Dakar Rally
← Previous event	Next event →
- Host country: France; Spain; Morocco; Sahrawi Arab Democratic Republic; Mauritania; Mali; Senegal
- Dates run: 1–17 January 1998
- Stages: 17

Results
- Cars winner: (France) Jean-Pierre Fontenay (France) Gilles Picard; Mitsubishi
- Bikes winner: (France) Stéphane Peterhansel; Yamaha
- Trucks winner: (Czech Republic) Karel Loprais (Czech Republic) Radomír Stachura (Czech Republic) Jan Cermak; Tatra 815

1998 Dakar Rally, also known as the 1998 Paris–Granada–Dakar Rally, was the 20th running of the Dakar Rally event. The rally returned to a traditional Paris to Dakar route last used in 1993. A number of competitors were attacked by unknown attackers near the end of the ninth stage, at Taoudenni in Mali. Jean-Pierre Fontenay won the car class and Stéphane Peterhansel won his sixth and final motorcycle title before switching to the car category for subsequent events. The truck title was won by Karel Loprais in a Tatra 815.

== Stages ==
Stage	Date	From	To	Total (km)	Stage winners		
Stage	Date	From	To	Total (km)	Bikes	Cars	Trucks
1	1 January	(France) Paris	(France) Narbonne	10	(France) F. Flick	(France) B. Saby	Stage cancelled
2	2 January	(France) Narbonne	(Spain) Granada	35	(Spain) N. Roma	(France) B. Saby	(France) C. Granjon
3	3 January	(Spain) Granada	(Spain) Almeria	38	(Italy) G. Sala	(France) B. Saby	(France) G. Versino
4	4 January	(Morocco) Nador	(Morocco) Er-Rachidia	247	(France) S. Peterhansel	(Japan) H. Masuoka	(France) G. Versino
5	5 January	(Morocco) Er-Rachidia	(Morocco) Ouarzazate	344	(Italy) F. Meoni	(Japan) K. Shinozuka	(France) G. Versino
6	6 January	(Morocco) Ouarzazate	(Morocco) / (Sahrawi Arab Democratic Republic) Smara	354	(France) S. Peterhansel	(France) J-P. Fontenay	(Czech Republic) K. Loprais
7	7 January	(Morocco) / (Sahrawi Arab Democratic Republic) Smara	(Mauritania) Zouerat	494	(France) S. Peterhansel	(Japan) K. Shinozuka	(France) G. Versino
8	8 January	(Mauritania) Zouerat	(Mauritania) El Mreiti	680	(Australia) A. Haydon	(France) J-P. Fontenay	(France) G. Versino
9	9 January	(Mauritania) El Mreiti	(Mali) Taoudenni	478	(Italy) F. Meoni	(Japan) H. Masuoka	(Russia) F. Kabirov
10	10 January	(Mali) Taoudenni	(Mali) Gao	Stage cancelled			
	11 January	(Mali) Gao		Rest day			
11	12 January	(Mali) Gao	(Mali) Timbuktu	411	(Spain) C. Sotelo	(France) J-P. Fontenay	(Russia) F. Kabirov
12	13 January	(Mali) Timbuktu	(Mauritania) Néma	551	(France) R. Sainct	(Japan) K. Shinozuka	(Russia) F. Kabirov
13	14 January	(Mauritania) Néma	(Mauritania) Tidjikja	745	(Australia) A. Haydon	(France) J-P. Fontenay	(Czech Republic) K. Loprais
14	15 January	(Mauritania) Tidjikja	(Mauritania) Atar	358	(Netherlands) G. Jimmink	(France) B. Saby	(Japan) Y. Sugawara
15	16 January	(Mauritania) Atar	(Mauritania) Boutilimit	290	(United Kingdom) J. Deacon	(France) J-P. Fontenay	(Japan) Y. Sugawara
16	17 January	(Mauritania) Boutilimit	(Senegal) Saint-Louis	166	(Netherlands) G. Jimmink	(Japan) K. Shinozuka	(Czech Republic) M. Koreny
17	18 January	(Senegal) Saint-Louis	(Senegal) Dakar	18	(Spain) J. Arcarons	(Germany) J. Kleinschmidt	(Japan) Y. Sugawara

== Stage results ==
=== Motorcycles ===
	Stage result					General classification				
Stage	Pos	Competitor	Make	Time	Gap	Pos	Competitor	Make	Time	Gap
1	1	(France) François Flick	Honda	9:33		1	(France) François Flick	Honda	9:33	
1	2	(Italy) Fabio Fasola	KTM	9:41	0:08	2	(Italy) Fabio Fasola	KTM	9:41	0:08
1	3	(Germany) Jurgen Mayer	KTM	9:45	0:12	3	(Germany) Jurgen Mayer	KTM	9:45	0:12
2	1	(Spain) Nani Roma	KTM	30:21		1	(Spain) Nani Roma	KTM	40:15	
2	2	(France) Alain Perez	KTM	30:38	0:17	2	(Italy) Giovanni Sala	KTM	40:36	0:21
2	3	(Italy) Giovanni Sala	KTM	30:43	0:22	3	(Italy) Fabio Fasola	KTM	41:02	0:47
3	1	(Italy) Giovanni Sala	KTM	5:15		1	(Spain) Nani Roma	KTM	45:33	
3	2	(Spain) Nani Roma	KTM	5:18	0:03	2	(Italy) Giovanni Sala	KTM	45:51	0:18
3	3	(Portugal) Paulo Manuel Marques	KTM	5:21	0:06	3	(France) Stéphane Peterhansel	Yamaha	46:36	1:03
4	1	(France) Stéphane Peterhansel	Yamaha	2:44:35		1	(France) Stéphane Peterhansel	Yamaha	3:31:11	
4	2	(Finland) Kari Tiainen	KTM	2:45:40	1:05	2	(France) Richard Sainct	KTM	3:33:35	2:24
4	3	(France) Richard Sainct	KTM	2:45:52	1:17	3	(Finland) Kari Tiainen	KTM	3:34:03	2:52
5	1	(Italy) Fabrizio Meoni	KTM	3:56:25		1	(Spain) Nani Roma	KTM	7:36:36	
5	2	(Spain) Nani Roma	KTM	3:59:32	3:07	2	(Italy) Fabrizio Meoni	KTM	7:38:09	1:33
5	3	(France) Thierry Magnaldi	KTM	4:00:02	3:37	3	(Spain) Jordi Arcarons	KTM	7:45:45	9:09
6	1	(France) Stéphane Peterhansel	Yamaha	3:46:38		1	(Spain) Nani Roma	KTM	11:25:40	
6	2	(Spain) Nani Roma	KTM	3:49:04	2:26	2	(Italy) Fabrizio Meoni	KTM	11:28:07	2:27
6	3	(France) Richard Sainct	KTM	3:49:37	2:59	3	(France) Stéphane Peterhansel	Yamaha	11:34:25	8:45
7	1	(France) Stéphane Peterhansel	Yamaha	4:35:38		1	(France) Stéphane Peterhansel	Yamaha	16:10:03	
7	2	(Spain) Carlos Sotelo	Cagiva	4:36:34	0:56	2	(Italy) Fabrizio Meoni	KTM	16:12:28	2:25
7	3	(Italy) Fabrizio Meoni	KTM	4:44:21	8:43	3	(Spain) Nani Roma	KTM	16:18:51	8:48
8	1	(Australia) Andy Haydon	KTM	8:19:03		1	(France) Stéphane Peterhansel	Yamaha	24:38:06	
8	2	(Spain) Nani Roma	KTM	8:20:04	1:01	2	(Spain) Nani Roma	KTM	24:38:55	0:49
8	3	(France) Richard Sainct	KTM	8:20:10	1:07	3	(France) Richard Sainct	KTM	24:49:52	11:46
9	1	(Italy) Fabrizio Meoni	KTM	2:56:47		1	(France) Stéphane Peterhansel	Yamaha	27:37:08	
9	2	(Italy) Giovanni Sala	KTM	2:58:27	1:40	2	(Italy) Fabrizio Meoni	KTM	27:47:53	10:45
9	3	(Spain) Carlos Sotelo	Cagiva	2:58:55	2:08	3	(France) Richard Sainct	KTM	27:50:58	13:50
10	Stage cancelled									
11	1	(Spain) Carlos Sotelo	Cagiva	3:50:38		1	(France) Stéphane Peterhansel	Yamaha	31:27:59	
11	2	(France) Stéphane Peterhansel	Yamaha	3:50:51	0:13	2	(France) Richard Sainct	KTM	31:48:05	20:06
11	3	(Australia) Andy Haydon	KTM	3:53:45	3:07	3	(Italy) Fabrizio Meoni	KTM	31:53:09	25:10
12	1	(France) Richard Sainct	KTM	7:12:07		1	(France) Stéphane Peterhansel	Yamaha	38:40:47	
12	2	(France) Stéphane Peterhansel	Yamaha	7:12:48	0:41	2	(France) Richard Sainct	KTM	39:00:12	19:25
12	3	(Italy) Fabrizio Meoni	KTM	7:20:58	8:51	3	(Italy) Fabrizio Meoni	KTM	39:14:07	33:20
13	1	(Australia) Andy Haydon	KTM	10:08:48		1	(France) Stéphane Peterhansel	Yamaha	48:57:33	
13	2	(South Africa) Alfie Cox	KTM	10:12:06	3:18	2	(Italy) Fabrizio Meoni	KTM	49:31:05	33:32
13	3	(France) Stéphane Peterhansel	Yamaha	10:16:46	7:58	3	(France) Richard Sainct	KTM	50:10:07	1:12:34
14	1	(Netherlands) Gerard Jimmink	KTM	5:44:52		1	(France) Stéphane Peterhansel	Yamaha	54:49:15	
14	2	(Italy) Fabrizio Meoni	KTM	5:50:43	5:51	2	(Italy) Fabrizio Meoni	KTM	55:21:48	32:33
14	3	(South Africa) Alfie Cox	KTM	5:51:24	6:32	3	(Australia) Andy Haydon	KTM	56:11:17	1:22:02
15	1	(United Kingdom) John Deacon	KTM	4:15:22		1	(France) Stéphane Peterhansel	Yamaha	59:19:34	
15	2	(France) Stéphane Peterhansel	Yamaha	4:30:19	14:57	2	(Italy) Fabrizio Meoni	KTM	59:53:58	34:24
15	3	(Italy) Fabrizio Meoni	KTM	4:32:10	16:48	3	(Australia) Andy Haydon	KTM	60:43:37	1:24:03
16	1	(South Africa) Alfie Cox	KTM	1:29:44		1	(France) Stéphane Peterhansel	Yamaha	62:18:31	
16	2	(Australia) Andy Haydon	KTM	1:31:50	2:06	2	(Italy) Fabrizio Meoni	KTM	62:50:58	32:27
16	3	(Netherlands) Gerard Jimmink	KTM	1:31:56	2:12	3	(Australia) Andy Haydon	KTM	63:35:43	1:17:12
17	1	(Spain) Jordi Arcarons	KTM	17:56		1	(France) Stéphane Peterhansel	Yamaha	62:39:37	
17	2	(Netherlands) Gerard Jimmink	KTM	18:20	0:24	2	(Italy) Fabrizio Meoni	KTM	63:10:06	30:29
17	3	(Germany) Dirk von Zitzewitz	KTM	18:55	0:59	3	(Australia) Andy Haydon	KTM	63:59:19	1:19:42

=== Cars ===
	Stage result					General classification				
Stage	Pos	Competitor	Make	Time	Gap	Pos	Competitor	Make	Time	Gap
1	1	(France) Bruno Saby (France) Dominique Serieys	Mitsubishi	9:45		1	(France) Bruno Saby (France) Dominique Serieys	Mitsubishi	9:45	
1	2	(Japan) Kenjiro Shinozuka (Andorra) Henri Magne	Mitsubishi	10:01	0:16	2	(Japan) Kenjiro Shinozuka (Andorra) Henri Magne	Mitsubishi	10:01	0:16
1	3	(France) Jean-Pierre Fontenay (France) Gilles Picard	Mitsubishi	10:14	0:29	3	(France) Jean-Pierre Fontenay (France) Gilles Picard	Mitsubishi	10:14	0:29
2	1	(France) Bruno Saby (France) Dominique Serieys	Mitsubishi	29:01		1	(France) Bruno Saby (France) Dominique Serieys	Mitsubishi	38:46	
2	2	(France) Jean-Pierre Fontenay (France) Gilles Picard	Mitsubishi	30:10	1:09	2	(France) Jean-Pierre Fontenay (France) Gilles Picard	Mitsubishi	40:24	1:38
2	3	(Japan) Kenjiro Shinozuka (Andorra) Henri Magne	Mitsubishi	30:52	1:51	3	(Japan) Kenjiro Shinozuka (Andorra) Henri Magne	Mitsubishi	40:53	2:07
3	1	(France) Bruno Saby (France) Dominique Serieys	Mitsubishi	29:05		1	(France) Bruno Saby (France) Dominique Serieys	Mitsubishi	1:07:51	
3	2	(France) Philippe Wambergue (France) Jean-Paul Cottret	Toyota	29:27	0:22	2	(France) Jean-Pierre Fontenay (France) Gilles Picard	Mitsubishi	1:09:55	2:04
3	3	(France) Jean-Pierre Fontenay (France) Gilles Picard	Mitsubishi	29:31	0:26	3	(Japan) Kenjiro Shinozuka (Andorra) Henri Magne	Mitsubishi	1:10:54	3:03
4	1	(Japan) Hiroshi Masuoka (Germany) Andreas Schulz	Mitsubishi	2:51:18		1	(France) Bruno Saby (France) Dominique Serieys	Mitsubishi	4:00:05	
4	2	(France) Jean-Pierre Fontenay (France) Gilles Picard	Mitsubishi	2:51:24	0:06	2	(France) Jean-Pierre Fontenay (France) Gilles Picard	Mitsubishi	4:01:19	1:14
4	3	(France) Bruno Saby (France) Dominique Serieys	Mitsubishi	2:52:14	0:56	3	(Japan) Kenjiro Shinozuka (Andorra) Henri Magne	Mitsubishi	4:03:56	3:51
5	1	(Japan) Kenjiro Shinozuka (Andorra) Henri Magne	Mitsubishi	3:32:47		1	(France) Bruno Saby (France) Dominique Serieys	Mitsubishi	7:34:05	
5	2	(France) Bruno Saby (France) Dominique Serieys	Mitsubishi	3:34:00	1:13	2	(Japan) Kenjiro Shinozuka (Andorra) Henri Magne	Mitsubishi	7:36:43	2:38
5	3	(France) Jean-Louis Schlesser (France) Anne-Chantal Pauwels	Schlesser	3:34:08	1:21	3	(France) Jean-Pierre Fontenay (France) Gilles Picard	Mitsubishi	7:38:28	4:23
6	1	(France) Jean-Pierre Fontenay (France) Gilles Picard	Mitsubishi	3:31:35		1	(France) Bruno Saby (France) Dominique Serieys	Mitsubishi	11:08:47	
6	2	(France) Bruno Saby (France) Dominique Serieys	Mitsubishi	3:34:42	3:07	2	(France) Jean-Pierre Fontenay (France) Gilles Picard	Mitsubishi	11:10:03	1:16
6	3	(France) Jean-Louis Schlesser (France) Anne-Chantal Pauwels	Schlesser	3:35:26	3:51	3	(Japan) Kenjiro Shinozuka (Andorra) Henri Magne	Mitsubishi	11:18:45	9:58
7	1	(Japan) Kenjiro Shinozuka (Andorra) Henri Magne	Mitsubishi	4:07:02		1	(France) Jean-Pierre Fontenay (France) Gilles Picard	Mitsubishi	15:20:43	
7	2	(France) Jean-Pierre Fontenay (France) Gilles Picard	Mitsubishi	4:10:40	3:38	2	(France) Bruno Saby (France) Dominique Serieys	Mitsubishi	15:21:53	1:10
7	3	(France) Bruno Saby (France) Dominique Serieys	Mitsubishi	4:13:06	6:04	3	(Japan) Kenjiro Shinozuka (Andorra) Henri Magne	Mitsubishi	15:25:47	5:04
8	1	(France) Jean-Pierre Fontenay (France) Gilles Picard	Mitsubishi	7:53:03		1	(France) Jean-Pierre Fontenay (France) Gilles Picard	Mitsubishi	23:13:46	
8	2	(Germany) Jutta Kleinschmidt (United Kingdom) Matthew Stevenson	Schlesser	8:03:52	10:49	2	(France) Bruno Saby (France) Dominique Serieys	Mitsubishi	23:28:13	14:27
8	3	(France) Bruno Saby (France) Dominique Serieys	Mitsubishi	8:06:20	13:17	3	(Germany) Jutta Kleinschmidt (United Kingdom) Matthew Stevenson	Schlesser	24:24:02	1:10:16
9	1	(Japan) Hiroshi Masuoka (Germany) Andreas Schulz	Mitsubishi	6:06:09		1	(France) Jean-Pierre Fontenay (France) Gilles Picard	Mitsubishi	29:25:45	
9	2	(France) Bruno Saby (France) Dominique Serieys	Mitsubishi	6:08:14	2:05	2	(France) Bruno Saby (France) Dominique Serieys	Mitsubishi	29:36:27	10:42
9	3	(France) Jean-Pierre Fontenay (France) Gilles Picard	Mitsubishi	6:11:59	5:50	3	(Japan) Hiroshi Masuoka (Germany) Andreas Schulz	Mitsubishi	31:06:54	1:41:09
10	Stage cancelled									
11	1	(France) Bruno Saby (France) Dominique Serieys	Mitsubishi	3:37:52		1	(France) Jean-Pierre Fontenay (France) Gilles Picard	Mitsubishi	33:04:54	
11	2	(France) Jean-Pierre Fontenay (France) Gilles Picard	Mitsubishi	3:39:09	1:17	2	(France) Bruno Saby (France) Dominique Serieys	Mitsubishi	33:14:19	9:25
11	3	(France) Jean-Louis Schlesser (France) Anne-Chantal Pauwels	Schlesser	3:49:45	11:53	3	(Japan) Kenjiro Shinozuka (Andorra) Henri Magne	Mitsubishi	35:03:20	1:58:26
12	1	(Japan) Kenjiro Shinozuka (Andorra) Henri Magne	Mitsubishi	7:26:35		1	(France) Jean-Pierre Fontenay (France) Gilles Picard	Mitsubishi	40:34:15	
12	2	(France) Jean-Pierre Fontenay (France) Gilles Picard	Mitsubishi	7:29:21	2:46	2	(France) Bruno Saby (France) Dominique Serieys	Mitsubishi	40:47:11	12:56
12	3	(France) Bruno Saby (France) Dominique Serieys	Mitsubishi	7:32:52	6:17	3	(Japan) Kenjiro Shinozuka (Andorra) Henri Magne	Mitsubishi	42:29:55	1:55:40
13	1	(France) Jean-Pierre Fontenay (France) Gilles Picard	Mitsubishi	10:01:30		1	(France) Jean-Pierre Fontenay (France) Gilles Picard	Mitsubishi	50:35:45	
13	2	(Japan) Kenjiro Shinozuka (Andorra) Henri Magne	Mitsubishi	10:05:34	4:04	2	(France) Bruno Saby (France) Dominique Serieys	Mitsubishi	51:21:57	46:12
13	3	(France) Bruno Saby (France) Dominique Serieys	Mitsubishi	10:34:46	33:16	3	(Japan) Kenjiro Shinozuka (Andorra) Henri Magne	Mitsubishi	52:35:29	1:59:44
14	1	(France) Bruno Saby (France) Dominique Serieys	Mitsubishi	6:32:38		1	(France) Jean-Pierre Fontenay (France) Gilles Picard	Mitsubishi	57:11:53	
14	2	(Japan) Kenjiro Shinozuka (Andorra) Henri Magne	Mitsubishi	6:34:27	1:59	2	(France) Bruno Saby (France) Dominique Serieys	Mitsubishi	57:54:25	42:32
14	3	(France) Jean-Pierre Fontenay (France) Gilles Picard	Mitsubishi	6:36:08	3:40	3	(Japan) Kenjiro Shinozuka (Andorra) Henri Magne	Mitsubishi	59:09:56	1:58:03
15	1	(France) Jean-Pierre Fontenay (France) Gilles Picard	Mitsubishi	4:33:39		1	(France) Jean-Pierre Fontenay (France) Gilles Picard	Mitsubishi	61:45:32	
15	2	(Japan) Kenjiro Shinozuka (Andorra) Henri Magne	Mitsubishi	4:35:55	2:16	2	(Japan) Kenjiro Shinozuka (Andorra) Henri Magne	Mitsubishi	63:45:51	2:00:19
15	3	(France) Jean-Louis Schlesser (France) Anne-Chantal Pauwels	Schlesser	4:40:50	7:11	3	(France) Bruno Saby (France) Dominique Serieys	Mitsubishi	63:54:59	2:09:27
16	1	(Japan) Kenjiro Shinozuka (Andorra) Henri Magne	Mitsubishi	1:15:41		1	(France) Jean-Pierre Fontenay (France) Gilles Picard	Mitsubishi	64:59:48	
16	2	(Japan) Hiroshi Masuoka (Germany) Andreas Schulz	Mitsubishi	1:17:28	1:47	2	(Japan) Kenjiro Shinozuka (Andorra) Henri Magne	Mitsubishi	66:41:31	1:41:43
16	3	(France) Bruno Saby (France) Dominique Serieys	Mitsubishi	1:19:03	3:22	3	(France) Bruno Saby (France) Dominique Serieys	Mitsubishi	66:54:46	1:54:58
17	1	(Germany) Jutta Kleinschmidt (United Kingdom) Matthew Stevenson	Schlesser	20:47		1	(France) Jean-Pierre Fontenay (France) Gilles Picard	Mitsubishi	65:25:58	
17	2	(France) Jean-Louis Schlesser (France) Anne-Chantal Pauwels	Schlesser	21:56	1:09	2	(Japan) Kenjiro Shinozuka (Andorra) Henri Magne	Mitsubishi	67:11:42	1:45:44
17	3	(France) Jean-Pierre Fontenay (France) Gilles Picard	Mitsubishi	26:10	5:23	3	(France) Bruno Saby (France) Dominique Serieys	Mitsubishi	67:24:59	1:59:01

=== Trucks ===
	Stage result					General classification				
Stage	Pos	Competitor	Make	Time	Gap	Pos	Competitor	Make	Time	Gap
1	Stage cancelled - all competitors awarded nominal time									
2	1	(France) Christophe Granjon (France) Anthony Martineau (France) Ahmed Benbekhti	Mitsubishi	39:40		1	(France) Christophe Granjon (France) Anthony Martineau (France) Ahmed Benbekhti	Mitsubishi	1:22:08	
2	2	(France) Gilbert Versino (France) Christian Versino (France) Christophe Gustiniani	Mitsubishi	40:34	0:54	2	(France) Gilbert Versino (France) Christian Versino (France) Christophe Gustiniani	Mitsubishi	1:23:02	0:54
2	3	(Russia) Viktor Moskovskikh (Russia) Semen Yakubov (Russia) Guenadi Ivanov	Kamaz	40:43	1:03	3	(Russia) Viktor Moskovskikh (Russia) Semen Yakubov (Russia) Guenadi Ivanov	Kamaz	1:23:11	1:03
3	1	(France) Gilbert Versino (France) Christian Versino (France) Christophe Gustiniani	Mitsubishi	28:02		1	(France) Christophe Granjon (France) Anthony Martineau (France) Ahmed Benbekhti	Mitsubishi	1:58:18	
3	2	(Russia) Viktor Moskovskikh (Russia) Semen Yakubov (Russia) Guenadi Ivanov	Kamaz	28:26	0:24	2	(France) Gilbert Versino (France) Christian Versino (France) Christophe Gustiniani	Mitsubishi	1:58:27	0:09
3	3	(France) Christophe Granjon (France) Anthony Martineau (France) Ahmed Benbekhti	Mitsubishi	28:40	0:38	3	(Russia) Viktor Moskovskikh (Russia) Semen Yakubov (Russia) Guenadi Ivanov	Kamaz	1:59:20	1:02
4	1	(France) Gilbert Versino (France) Christian Versino (France) Christophe Gustiniani	Mitsubishi	3:37:58		1	(France) Gilbert Versino (France) Christian Versino (France) Christophe Gustiniani	Mitsubishi	5:36:25	
4	2	(France) Christophe Granjon (France) Anthony Martineau (France) Ahmed Benbekhti	Mitsubishi	3:52:38	14:40	2	(France) Christophe Granjon (France) Anthony Martineau (France) Ahmed Benbekhti	Mitsubishi	5:50:56	14:31
4	3	(Czech Republic) Milan Koreny (Czech Republic) Jaroslav Lamač (Czech Republic) Martin Kahanek	Tatra	3:57:25	19:27	3	(Czech Republic) Milan Koreny (Czech Republic) Jaroslav Lamač (Czech Republic) Martin Kahanek	Tatra	6:01:27	24:42
5	1	(France) Gilbert Versino (France) Christian Versino (France) Christophe Gustiniani	Mitsubishi	4:25:31		1	(France) Gilbert Versino (France) Christian Versino (France) Christophe Gustiniani	Mitsubishi	10:01:56	
5	2	(Russia) Vladimir Chagin (Russia) Ayrat Mardeev (Russia) Sergey Savostin	Kamaz	4:45:20	19:49	2	(Czech Republic) Milan Koreny (Czech Republic) Jaroslav Lamač (Czech Republic) Martin Kahanek	Tatra	11:00:39	58:43
5	3	(Czech Republic) Karel Loprais (Czech Republic) Radomír Stachura (Czech Republic) Jan Cermak	Tatra	4:47:51	22:20	3	(France) Christophe Granjon (France) Anthony Martineau (France) Ahmed Benbekhti	Mitsubishi	11:05:24	1:03:28
6	1	(Czech Republic) Karel Loprais (Czech Republic) Radomír Stachura (Czech Republic) Jan Cermak	Tatra	4:44:33		1	(France) Gilbert Versino (France) Christian Versino (France) Christophe Gustiniani	Mitsubishi	14:49:16	
6	2	(France) Gilbert Versino (France) Christian Versino (France) Christophe Gustiniani	Mitsubishi	4:47:20	2:47	2	(Czech Republic) Milan Koreny (Czech Republic) Jaroslav Lamač (Czech Republic) Martin Kahanek	Tatra	15:51:18	1:02:02
6	3	(Czech Republic) Milan Koreny (Czech Republic) Jaroslav Lamač (Czech Republic) Martin Kahanek	Tatra	4:50:39	6:06	3	(Czech Republic) Karel Loprais (Czech Republic) Radomír Stachura (Czech Republic) Jan Cermak	Tatra	15:54:15	1:04:59
7	1	(France) Gilbert Versino (France) Christian Versino (France) Christophe Gustiniani	Mitsubishi	5:16:25		1	(France) Gilbert Versino (France) Christian Versino (France) Christophe Gustiniani	Mitsubishi	20:05:41	
7	2	(Russia) Firdaus Kabirov (Russia) Ayrat Belyaev (Russia) Vladimir Goloub	Kamaz	5:16:44	0:19	2	(Czech Republic) Karel Loprais (Czech Republic) Radomír Stachura (Czech Republic) Jan Cermak	Tatra	21:15:47	1:10:06
7	3	(Russia) Vladimir Chagin (Russia) Ayrat Mardeev (Russia) Sergey Savostin	Kamaz	5:17:51	1:26	3	(Russia) Firdaus Kabirov (Russia) Ayrat Belyaev (Russia) Vladimir Goloub	Kamaz	21:48:39	1:42:58
8	1	(France) Gilbert Versino (France) Christian Versino (France) Christophe Gustiniani	Mitsubishi	11:02:48		1	(France) Gilbert Versino (France) Christian Versino (France) Christophe Gustiniani	Mitsubishi	31:08:29	
8	2	(Czech Republic) Karel Loprais (Czech Republic) Radomír Stachura (Czech Republic) Jan Cermak	Tatra	11:34:54	32:06	2	(Czech Republic) Karel Loprais (Czech Republic) Radomír Stachura (Czech Republic) Jan Cermak	Tatra	32:50:41	1:42:12
8	3	(Japan) Yoshimasa Sugawara (Japan) Naoko Matsumoto (Japan) Takashi Ushioda	Hino	12:18:42	1:15:54	3	(Japan) Yoshimasa Sugawara (Japan) Naoko Matsumoto (Japan) Takashi Ushioda	Hino	34:55:25	3:46:56
9	1	(Russia) Firdaus Kabirov (Russia) Ayrat Belyaev (Russia) Vladimir Goloub	Kamaz	8:45:53		1	(Czech Republic) Karel Loprais (Czech Republic) Radomír Stachura (Czech Republic) Jan Cermak	Tatra	41:41:36	
9	2	(Czech Republic) Karel Loprais (Czech Republic) Radomír Stachura (Czech Republic) Jan Cermak	Tatra	8:50:55	5:02	2	(Japan) Yoshimasa Sugawara (Japan) Naoko Matsumoto (Japan) Takashi Ushioda	Hino	44:44:01	3:02:25
9	3	(Japan) Yoshimasa Sugawara (Japan) Naoko Matsumoto (Japan) Takashi Ushioda	Hino	9:48:36	1:02:43	3	(Russia) Firdaus Kabirov (Russia) Ayrat Belyaev (Russia) Vladimir Goloub	Kamaz	46:29:08	4:47:32
10	Stage cancelled									
11	1	(Russia) Firdaus Kabirov (Russia) Ayrat Belyaev (Russia) Vladimir Goloub	Kamaz	4:47:57		1	(Czech Republic) Karel Loprais (Czech Republic) Radomír Stachura (Czech Republic) Jan Cermak	Tatra	46:37:59	
11	2	(Czech Republic) Karel Loprais (Czech Republic) Radomír Stachura (Czech Republic) Jan Cermak	Tatra	4:56:23	8:26	2	(Japan) Yoshimasa Sugawara (Japan) Naoko Matsumoto (Japan) Takashi Ushioda	Hino	50:04:14	3:26:15
11	3	(Czech Republic) Milan Koreny (Czech Republic) Jaroslav Lamač (Czech Republic) Martin Kahanek	Tatra	5:14:48	26:51	3	(Russia) Firdaus Kabirov (Russia) Ayrat Belyaev (Russia) Vladimir Goloub	Kamaz	51:17:05	4:39:06
12	1	(Russia) Firdaus Kabirov (Russia) Ayrat Belyaev (Russia) Vladimir Goloub	Kamaz	9:32:18		1	(Czech Republic) Karel Loprais (Czech Republic) Radomír Stachura (Czech Republic) Jan Cermak	Tatra	56:20:47	
12	2	(Czech Republic) Karel Loprais (Czech Republic) Radomír Stachura (Czech Republic) Jan Cermak	Tatra	9:42:48	10:30	2	(Japan) Yoshimasa Sugawara (Japan) Naoko Matsumoto (Japan) Takashi Ushioda	Hino	60:13:24	3:52:37
12	3	(Czech Republic) Milan Koreny (Czech Republic) Jaroslav Lamač (Czech Republic) Martin Kahanek	Tatra	9:51:46	19:28	3	(Russia) Firdaus Kabirov (Russia) Ayrat Belyaev (Russia) Vladimir Goloub	Kamaz	60:49:23	4:28:36
13	1	(Czech Republic) Karel Loprais (Czech Republic) Radomír Stachura (Czech Republic) Jan Cermak	Tatra	14:17:51		1	(Czech Republic) Karel Loprais (Czech Republic) Radomír Stachura (Czech Republic) Jan Cermak	Tatra	70:38:38	
13	2	(Czech Republic) Milan Koreny (Czech Republic) Jaroslav Lamač (Czech Republic) Martin Kahanek	Tatra	14:49:01	31:10	2	(Japan) Yoshimasa Sugawara (Japan) Naoko Matsumoto (Japan) Takashi Ushioda	Hino	75:36:17	4:57:39
13	3	(Japan) Yoshimasa Sugawara (Japan) Naoko Matsumoto (Japan) Takashi Ushioda	Hino	15:22:53	1:05:02	3	(Czech Republic) Milan Koreny (Czech Republic) Jaroslav Lamač (Czech Republic) Martin Kahanek	Tatra	77:09:13	6:30:35
14	1	(Japan) Yoshimasa Sugawara (Japan) Naoko Matsumoto (Japan) Takashi Ushioda	Hino	8:42:40		1	(Czech Republic) Karel Loprais (Czech Republic) Radomír Stachura (Czech Republic) Jan Cermak	Tatra	79:22:11	
14	2	(Czech Republic) Karel Loprais (Czech Republic) Radomír Stachura (Czech Republic) Jan Cermak	Tatra	8:43:33	0:53	2	(Japan) Yoshimasa Sugawara (Japan) Naoko Matsumoto (Japan) Takashi Ushioda	Hino	84:18:57	4:56:46
14	3	(Czech Republic) Milan Koreny (Czech Republic) Jaroslav Lamač (Czech Republic) Martin Kahanek	Tatra	8:47:25	4:45	3	(Czech Republic) Milan Koreny (Czech Republic) Jaroslav Lamač (Czech Republic) Martin Kahanek	Tatra	85:56:38	6:34:27
15	1	(Japan) Yoshimasa Sugawara (Japan) Naoko Matsumoto (Japan) Takashi Ushioda	Hino	5:49:38		1	(Czech Republic) Karel Loprais (Czech Republic) Radomír Stachura (Czech Republic) Jan Cermak	Tatra	85:12:04	
15	2	(Czech Republic) Karel Loprais (Czech Republic) Radomír Stachura (Czech Republic) Jan Cermak	Tatra	5:49:53	0:15	2	(Japan) Yoshimasa Sugawara (Japan) Naoko Matsumoto (Japan) Takashi Ushioda	Hino	90:08:35	4:56:31
15	3	(Czech Republic) Milan Koreny (Czech Republic) Jaroslav Lamač (Czech Republic) Martin Kahanek	Tatra	6:17:13	27:35	3	(Czech Republic) Milan Koreny (Czech Republic) Jaroslav Lamač (Czech Republic) Martin Kahanek	Tatra	92:13:51	7:01:47
16	1	(Czech Republic) Milan Koreny (Czech Republic) Jaroslav Lamač (Czech Republic) Martin Kahanek	Tatra	4:05:52		1	(Czech Republic) Karel Loprais (Czech Republic) Radomír Stachura (Czech Republic) Jan Cermak	Tatra	89:19:40	
16	2	(Czech Republic) Karel Loprais (Czech Republic) Radomír Stachura (Czech Republic) Jan Cermak	Tatra	4:07:36	1:44	2	(Japan) Yoshimasa Sugawara (Japan) Naoko Matsumoto (Japan) Takashi Ushioda	Hino	94:24:29	5:04:49
16	3	(Japan) Yoshimasa Sugawara (Japan) Naoko Matsumoto (Japan) Takashi Ushioda	Hino	4:15:54	10:02	3	(Czech Republic) Milan Koreny (Czech Republic) Jaroslav Lamač (Czech Republic) Martin Kahanek	Tatra	96:19:43	7:00:03
17	1	(Japan) Yoshimasa Sugawara (Japan) Naoko Matsumoto (Japan) Takashi Ushioda	Hino	33:20		1	(Czech Republic) Karel Loprais (Czech Republic) Radomír Stachura (Czech Republic) Jan Cermak	Tatra	89:53:50	
17	2	(Czech Republic) Karel Loprais (Czech Republic) Radomír Stachura (Czech Republic) Jan Cermak	Tatra	34:10	0:50	2	(Japan) Yoshimasa Sugawara (Japan) Naoko Matsumoto (Japan) Takashi Ushioda	Hino	94:57:49	5:03:59
17	3	(Czech Republic) Milan Koreny (Czech Republic) Jaroslav Lamač (Czech Republic) Martin Kahanek	Tatra	34:41	1:21	3	(Czech Republic) Milan Koreny (Czech Republic) Jaroslav Lamač (Czech Republic) Martin Kahanek	Tatra	96:54:24	7:00:34

== Final standings ==
=== Motorcycles ===
Pos	No.	Rider	Bike	Entrant	Time
1	1	(France) Stéphane Peterhansel	Yamaha	Yamaha Motor France	62:39:37
2	8	(Italy) Fabrizio Meoni	KTM	KTM Austria	+30:29
3	24	(Australia) Andy Haydon	KTM		+1:19:42
4	25	(South Africa) Alfie Cox	KTM		+2:25:57
5	7	(Netherlands) Gerard Jimmink	KTM	Jimmink Holland	+3:16:29
6	4	(Spain) Jordi Arcarons	KTM	KTM Austria	+4:57:44
7	20	(Germany) Dirk von Zitzewitz	KTM	KTM Austria	+5:32:35
8	31	(United Kingdom) John Deacon	KTM		+5:48:37
9	47	(Germany) Jurgen Mayer	KTM	Shell Advance	+7:56:41
10	136	(Czech Republic) Stanislav Zloch	KTM	Slovnaft Sport Moto	+9:01:30

=== Cars ===
Pos	No.	Driver	Co-Driver	Car	Entrant	Time
1	206	(France) Jean-Pierre Fontenay	(France) Gilles Picard	Mitsubishi	Sonauto Mitsubishi	65:25:58
2	204	(Japan) Kenjiro Shinozuka	(Andorra) Henri Magne	Mitsubishi	Sonauto Mitsubishi	+1:45:44
3	205	(France) Bruno Saby	(France) Dominique Serieys	Mitsubishi	Sonauto Mitsubishi	+1:59:01
4	209	(Japan) Hiroshi Masuoka	(Germany) Andreas Schulz	Mitsubishi	Sonauto Mitsubishi	+5:55:27
5	202	(France) Jean-Louis Schlesser	(France) Anne-Chantal Pauwels	Schlesser	Schlesser Aventures	+8:10:39
6	223	(France) Philippe Alliot	(France) Jacky Dubois	Nissan	Team Dessoude	+11:39:43
7	215	(France) Dominique Housieaux	(Italy) Maurizio Dominella	Nissan	Team Dessoude	+13:20:24
8	211	(France) Thierry Delavergne	(France) Luis Arguelles	Nissan	Team Dessoude	+13:52:15
9	222	(Spain) Miguel Prieto	(Spain) Fernando Gil	Mitsubishi		+17:42:50
10	311	(Netherlands) Bob Ten Harkel	(Netherlands) Hennie den Toom	Mitsubishi		+23:28:05

=== Trucks ===
Pos	No.	Driver	Co-Drivers	Truck	Time
1	407	(Czech Republic) Karel Loprais	(Czech Republic) Radomír Stachura (Czech Republic) Jan Cermak	Tatra 815	89:53:50
2	400	(Japan) Yoshimasa Sugawara	(Japan) Naoko Matsumoto (Japan) Takashi Ushioda	Hino	+5:03:59
3	414	(Czech Republic) Milan Koreny	(Czech Republic) Jaroslav Lamač (Czech Republic) Martin Kahanek	Tatra	+7:00:34
4	403	(Germany) Klaus Bauerle	(Germany) Anek Schurhagl	Mercedes-Benz	+14:45:45
5	408	(France) Jean-Paul Bosonnet	(France) Serge Lacourt (France) Jean-Louis Berger	Mercedes-Benz	+19:26:13
6	410	(France) Raphael Gimbre	(France) François Marcheix (France) Ai Nhat Bui	Mercedes-Benz	+19:44:37
7	420	(France) Christian Barbier	(France) Daniel Moquet (France) Pierre Barbier	Mitsubishi	+22:07:50
8	402	(Italy) Marco Balboni	(Italy) Guido Toni	Mercedes-Benz	+44:32:57
