= Edi Orioli =

Italian motorcycle racer (born 1962)

Edi Orioli (born 5 December 1962 in Udine) is an Italian rallying motorcycle racer.

Many consider Orioli to be one of the best motorcyclists in rallying, with four victories in the Dakar Rally, and one victory in the Pharaoh Rally, and was considered a great motorcyclist before commencing a career in automobile racing.

== Honours ==
- Won Dakar Rally 1988, 1990, 1994, 1996; placed 2nd in 1987, and 3rd in 1995
- Won Pharaoh Rally 1993

Sporting positions
Preceded by Cyril Neveu	Dakar Rally; Motorcycle Winner; 1988	Succeeded by Gilles Lalay
Preceded by Gilles Lalay	Dakar Rally; Motorcycle Winner; 1990	Succeeded by Stéphane Peterhansel
Preceded by Stéphane Peterhansel	Dakar Rally; Motorcycle Winner; 1994	Succeeded by Stéphane Peterhansel
Preceded by Stéphane Peterhansel	Dakar Rally; Motorcycle Winner; 1996	Succeeded by Stéphane Peterhansel
