= Gilles Lalay =

French motorcycle racer

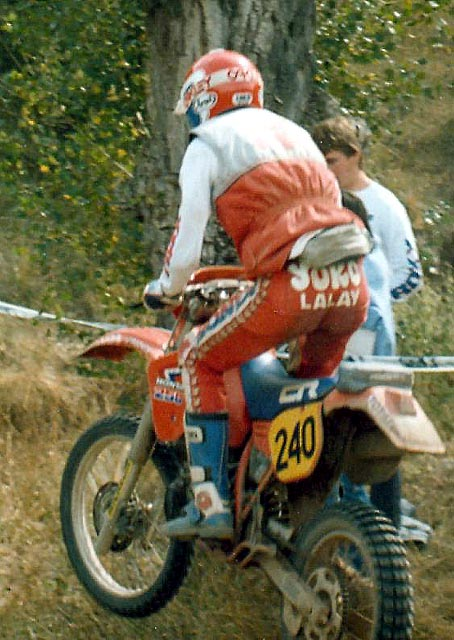
- Gilles Lalay - ISDE 85

Personal information
- Born: 21 March 1962 Peyrat-le-Château, France
- Died: 7 January 1992 (aged 29) Lumombo, Congo

Sport
- Country: France
- Sport: Motorsport
- Event: Rally raid
Medal record
Rally raid
Event	1st	2nd	3rd
Dakar Rally	1	2	1
Atlas Rally	3	-	-
Total	4	2	1

Gilles Lalay (21 March 1962 – 7 January 1992) was a French professional motorcycle enduro and rally raid competitor.

== Biography ==
Lalay was born in Peyrat-le-Château, France. One of the world's best enduro riders during the 80s, he was a ten-time enduro Champion of France, and a nine-time ISDE winner. He won the motorcycle section of the Dakar Rally in 1989. He also won the motorcycle section of the Atlas Rally in 1986, 1987 and 1989, and the Djerba 500 Rally in 1984. In 1985 as France presented no team for the ISDE held in Spain, he engaged as an individual and won the race on his private Honda 250 CR.

Laley died on January 7, 1992, in Lumombo, Congo, in a collision with one of the organisation vehicles during the Dakar Rally race.

== Rally Dakar ==
Lalay complete results are in the Dakar Historic Book.

Year	Bike	Rank	Stages
1986	Honda NXR 780	2nd	
1988	Honda NXR 750	3rd	
1989	Honda NXR 800V	1st	
1991	Yamaha YZE 750T	2nd	
