= Yamaha XTZ 660 =

Yamaha XTZ 660 Ténéré
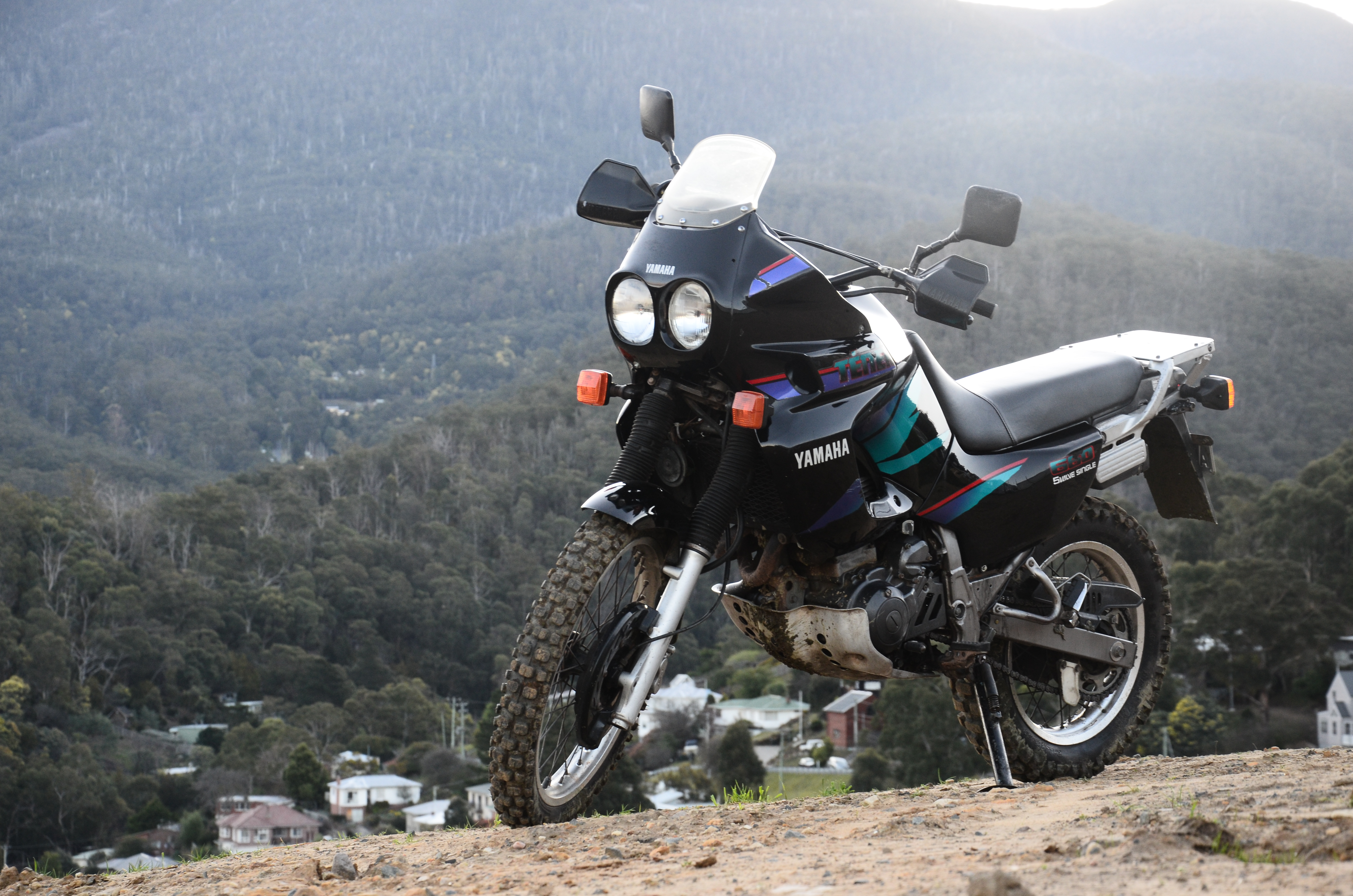
- Xtz-660
- Manufacturer: Yamaha Motor Company
- Production: 1991–1999
- Predecessor: XT600Z Ténéré
- Successor: XT660Z Ténéré
- Class: Dual-sport
- Engine: 659 cc liquid-cooled, 5-valve, single-cylinder, SOHC
- Bore / stroke: 100 mm × 84 mm (3.9 in × 3.3 in)
- Top speed: 158 km/h (98 mph)
- Power: 48 hp (36 kW) @ 6,250 rpm
- Torque: 57 N⋅m (42 lbf⋅ft) @ 5,250 rpm
- Transmission: 5-speed
- Brakes: Front: single disc Rear: single disc
- Wheelbase: 1,495 mm (58.9 in)
- Dimensions: L: 2,355 mm (92.7 in); W: 885 mm (34.8 in)
- Seat height: 865 mm (34.1 in)
- Weight: 171 kg (377 lb) (dry); 195 kg (430 lb) (wet)
- Fuel capacity: 20 L (4.4 imp gal; 5.3 US gal)
- Related: XTZ 750

The Yamaha XTZ 660 Ténéré is a dual-sport motorcycle produced by Yamaha from 1991 to 1999. The bike is named after the Ténéré desert stage of the former Paris-Dakar Rally in northeastern Niger. The 1991 to 1993 version has a rectangular front light, while the 1994 and later models had two circular lights. Yamaha's team performance during the 1990s editions of the Dakar resulted in a good reputation for the XTZ family.

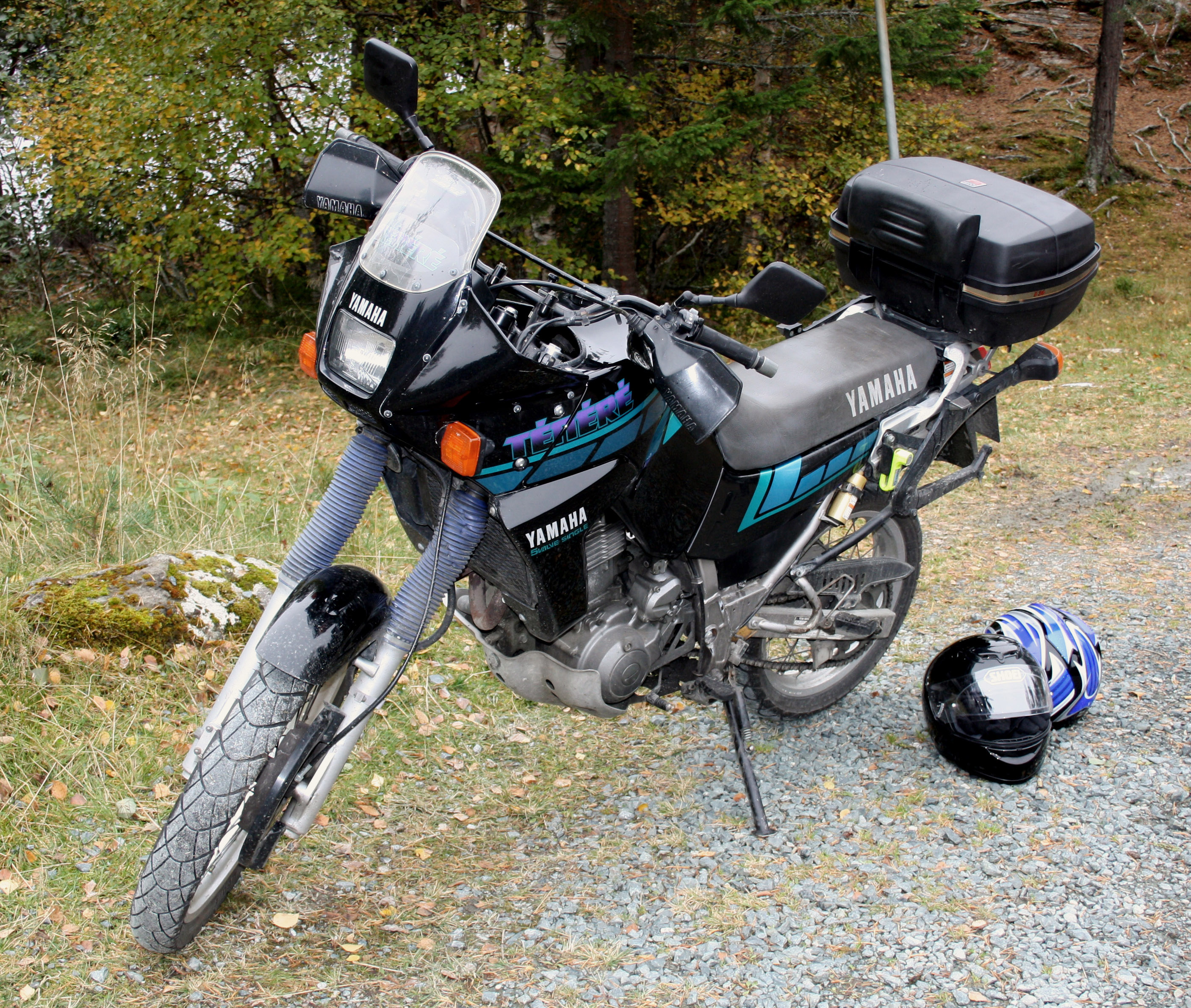
