= 1991 Paris–Dakar Rally =

Off-road motorsport event in France and Africa

1991 Dakar Rally

Seasons
- ← 1990 1992 →

1991 Dakar Rally also known as the 1991 Paris–Dakar Rally was the 13th running of the Dakar Rally event. The rally was won by 1981 world rally champion, Ari Vatanen, for the third successive time and for the fourth time in five years. Stéphane Peterhansel won the motorcycle category.

== Stages ==
Stage	Date	Stage	Special	Special (km)	Total (km)
Prologue	29 December	(France) Clermont-Ferrand	Prologue	5.5	5.5
1	1 January	(Algeria) Tripoli- (Algeria) Ghadamès	Liaison	0	604
2		(Algeria) Ghadamès- (Algeria) Ghat	(Algeria) Ghadamès- (Algeria) Idri	594	594
2		(Algeria) Ghadamès- (Algeria) Ghat	(Algeria) Idri- (Algeria) Ghat	501	501
3		(Algeria) Ghat- (Algeria) Tumu	(Algeria) Ghat- (Algeria) Tumu	681	681
4		(Algeria) Tumu- (Niger) Dirkou	(Algeria) Tumu- (Niger) Dirkou	601	601
5		(Niger) Dirkou- (Niger) Agadez	(Niger) Dirkou- (Niger) Gossololom	350	350
5		(Niger) Dirkou- (Niger) Agadez	(Niger) Gossololom- (Niger) Agadez	490	490
Rest	9 January				
6		(Niger) Agadez- (Mali) Gao	(Niger) Assouas- (Niger) Tillia	456	516
6		(Niger) Agadez- (Mali) Gao	(Niger) Tillia- (Mali) Gao	630	630
7		(Mali) Gao- (Mali) Tombouctou	Convoy	410	410
8		(Mali) Tombouctou- (Mauritania) Néma	(Mali) Tombouctou- (Mauritania) Néma	672	672
9		(Mauritania) Néma- (Mauritania) Kiffa	(Mauritania) Néma- (Mauritania) Tichit	482	482
9		(Mauritania) Néma- (Mauritania) Kiffa	(Mauritania) Tichit- (Mauritania) Kiffa	532	532
10		(Mauritania) Kiffa- (Senegal) Tambacounda	(Mauritania) Kiffa- (Mali) Kayes	283	572
11	17 January	(Senegal) Tambacounda- (Senegal) Dakar	(Senegal) M’Boro- (Senegal) Lac Retba	60	536
Total				6,747	9,186

== Stage Winners ==
Stage	Cars		Bikes	
Prologue	(Finland) Ari Vatanen/ (Sweden) Bruno Berglund	Citroën	(France) Laurent Charbonnel	Kawasaki
1	Liaison			
2	(Belgium) Jacky Ickx/ (Belgium) Christian Tarin	Citroën	(Italy) Alessandro De Petri	Yamaha
2	(Finland) Ari Vatanen/ (Sweden) Bruno Berglund	Citroën	(France) Marc Morales	Cagiva
3	(France) Hubert Auriol/ (France) Philippe Monnet	Lada	(Italy) Luigino Medardo	Gilera
4	(Japan) Kenjiro Shinozuka	Mitsubishi	(Italy) Alessandro De Petri	Yamaha
5	(Sweden) Kenneth Eriksson/ (Sweden) Staffan Parmander	Mitsubishi	(France) Wagner	Suzuki
5	(Finland) Ari Vatanen/ (Sweden) Bruno Berglund	Citroën	(France) Stephane Peterhansel	Yamaha
Rest
6	(Sweden) Kenneth Eriksson/ (Sweden) Staffan Parmander	Mitsubishi	(Italy) Alessandro De Petri	Yamaha
6	(Finland) Ari Vatanen/ (Sweden) Bruno Berglund	Citroën	(Spain) Jordi Arcarons	Cagiva
7	Convoy			
8	(Sweden) Kenneth Eriksson/ (Sweden) Staffan Parmander	Mitsubishi	(France) Gilles Lalay	Yamaha
9	(Sweden) Kenneth Eriksson/ (Sweden) Staffan Parmander	Mitsubishi	(Italy) Edi Orioli	Cagiva
9	(Sweden) Kenneth Eriksson/ (Sweden) Staffan Parmander	Mitsubishi	(France) Thierry Magnaldi	Yamaha
10	(France) Hubert Auriol/ (France) Philippe Monnet	Lada	(France) Gilles Lalay	Yamaha
11	(Finland) Ari Vatanen/ (Sweden) Bruno Berglund	Citroën	(Spain) Jordi Arcarons	Cagiva
