= John Deacon (motorcyclist) =

British motorcycle racer

John Deacon (30 November 1962 – 8 August 2001) was a British motorcycle enduro racer. He won several Paris–Dakar Rally stages. He died of injuries sustained from a crash in the Masters Rally in Syria.

Deacon won the British Enduro four-stroke championship on ten occasions and won nine gold medals at the International Six Days Enduro event. He first contested the Paris-Dakar in 1997, becoming only the second British rider to finish the three-week, 7,000-mile event across Africa on a motorcycle. Within two years, and still funding his own participation, he claimed his country's best finish of sixth, beaten by five riders who enjoyed substantial financial backing.

The dangers of the sport were highlighted in the 2000 event, run in reverse from Senegal to Egypt, when he was offered a ride for the BMW Gauloises team but crashed on the fifth day, fracturing his pelvis and wrist, as well as dislocating his shoulder.

Deacon took part in the 2001 Masters Rally from France to Jordan, riding a BMW. On 8 August 2001, on the seventh stage, Deacon fell heavily on rocks 77 miles from the town of Palmyra in Syria. He was running third in the event at the time. Fellow rider Patrick Lambin found Deacon, who had sustained head injuries. A helicopter was summoned to transport him to hospital, but Deacon died before it arrived.

Deacon was survived by his two children James and Zoe and his wife Tracey, who continue to run his KTM and Gas Gas dealership JD Racing in his home town of Saltash, Cornwall.
