= Adiri, Libya =

Adiri أدري Idiri Adrī
- Town

Idiri transcription(s)
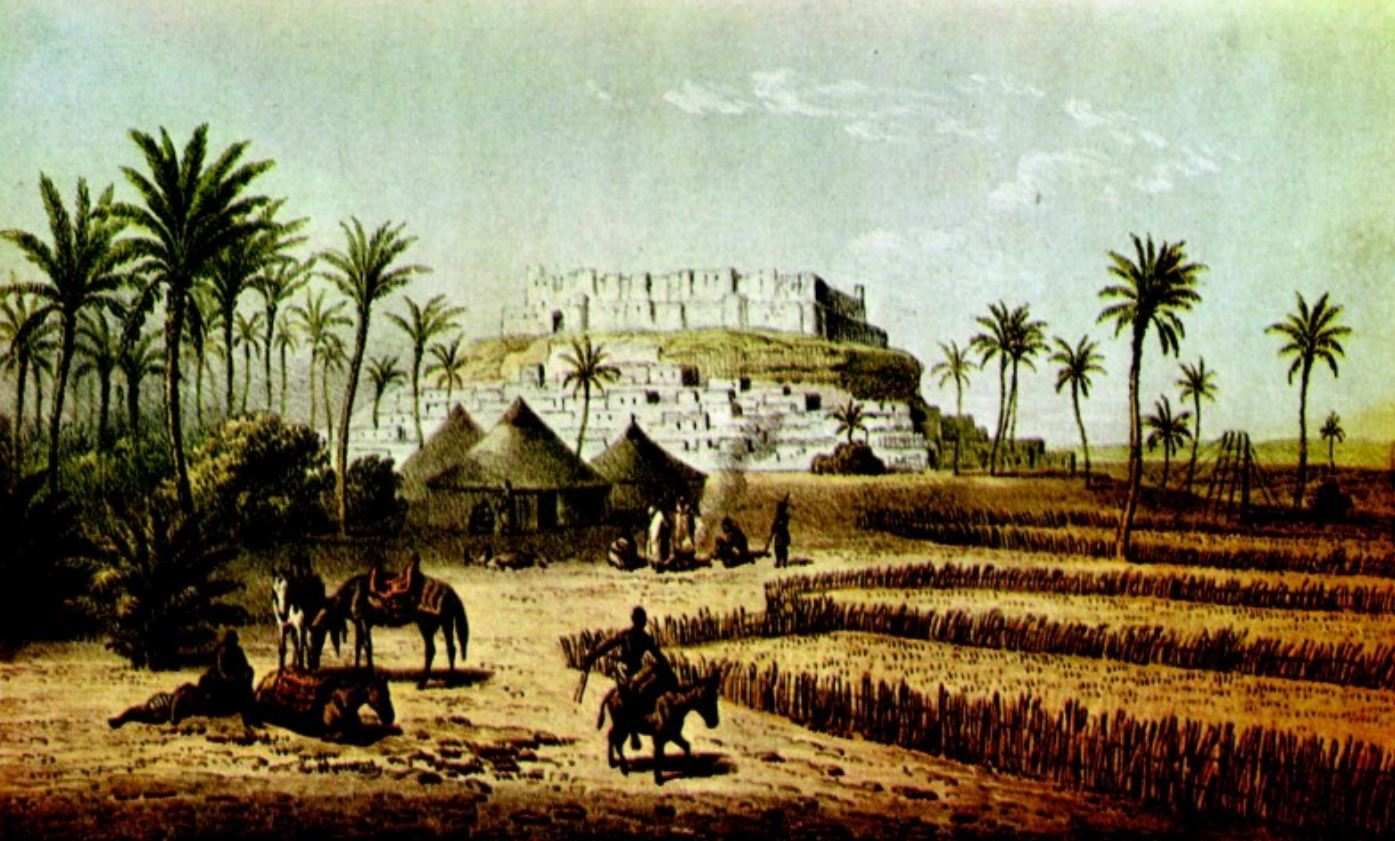

- Location in Libya
- Coordinates: 27°30′00″N 13°16′00″E
- Country: Libya
- District: Wadi al Shatii

Population (2024)
  - Total: 9,760
- Time zone: UTC + 2

Adiri (Arabic: أدري Adrī) is a town in the Wadi al Shatii district in Libya. The city has a population of 9,760 people (as of 2024).
