= 1993 Paris–Dakar Rally =

Motorsport race in Europe and Africa

1993 Dakar Rally

Seasons
- ← 1992 1994 →

1993 Dakar Rally, also known as the 1993 Paris–Dakar Rally, was the 15th running of the Dakar Rally, a rally raid race held on January 1-16 in Europe and Africa. It marked the return to the original Paris–Dakar route, with 12 stages in France, Morocco, Algeria, Mauritania and Senegal, comprising 8,877 km of total stages and 4,476 km of timed stages.

The race had 154 entries, with 65 cars, 46 motorcycles and 42 truck. Only 67 entries took the chequered flag, with 12 motorcycles, 44 cars and 11 trucks. The car classification was won by Bruno Saby on his second start. Stephane Peterhansel won the motorcycle class for the third time. On stage 4, Ari Vatanen won the car classification at a record average speed above 155 km/h. No fatalities were registered in the race.

It was the last Dakar Rally to be organised by Gilbert Sabine, the father of race founder Thierry Sabine, as he sold the promoting company to the Amaury Sport Organisation for the following year.

== Stages ==
Stage	Date	Start	Finish	Total km	Timed km
P	January 1	(France) Paris (Trocadero)	(France) Beaune	349	3.5 (Chailley)
-	January 2	(France) Beaune	(France) Sète	590	0
-	January 3	(France) Sète	(France) Tangier	-	-
-	January 4	(Morocco) Tangier	(Morocco) Fez	310	0
1	January 5	(Morocco) Fez	(Morocco) Béni Ounif	761	295
2	January 6	(Morocco) Béni Ounif	(Algeria) El Goléa		791 (cars and trucks); 541 (motorcycles)
C (Note: Stage 3 was cancelled after a significant number of competitors struggled on stage 2.)	January 7	(Algeria) El Goléa	(Algeria) Bordj Omar Driss	653	~~465~~
4	January 8	(Algeria) Bordj Omar Driss	(Algeria) Tamanrasset	735	550
5	January 9	(Algeria) Tamanrasset	(Algeria) Adrar	1191	801 (cars and trucks); 493 (motorcycles)
-	January 10	Rest day			
6	January 11	(Algeria) Adrar	(Algeria) Chenachen	626	626
7	January 12	(Algeria) Chenachen	(Mauritania) Bir Amrane	650	650
8	January 13	(Mauritania) Bir Amrane	(Mauritania) Atar		522
9	January 14	(Mauritania) Atar	(Mauritania) Atar	224	224
10	January 15	(Mauritania) Atar	(Mauritania) Nouakchott	533	450
11	January 16	(Mauritania) Nouakchott	(Senegal) Dakar (Lac Rose)	517	60

== Final standings ==
=== Motorcycles ===
Position	Driver	Motorcycle	Time
1	(France) Stéphane Peterhansel	Yamaha YZE 850 T	51:51'51
2	(France) Thierry Charbonnier	Yamaha YZE 850 T	+ 1:22'19
3	(Spain) Jordi Arcarons	Yamaha YZE 850 T	+ 8:01'01
4	(France) Jean-Marie Bennerotte	Kawasaki KLE500	+ 13:20'50
5	(Brazil) Klever Kolberg	Yamaha XTZ 660	+ 14:15'04
6	(Spain) Agustín Fernández	Suzuki DR650	+ 15:18'03
7	(France) Patrick Sireyjol	Suzuki DR-Z 800	+ 18:26'39
8	(Italy) Massimo Montebelli	Yamaha XTZ 660	+ 18:56'49
9	(Brazil) André de Azevedo	Yamaha XTZ 660	+ 19:21'51
10	(Italy) Massimo Marmiroli	Gilera RC 600	+ 19:17'40

=== Cars ===
Position	Driver	Co-driver	Car	Time
1	(France) Bruno Saby	(France) Dominique Serieys	Mitsubishi Pajero	49:56'02
2	(France) Pierre Lartigue	(France) Michel Périn	Citroën ZX	+ 1:09'45
3	(France) Hubert Auriol	(France) Gilles Picard	Citroën ZX	+ 4:02'08
4	(Germany) Erwin Weber	(Germany) Manfred Hiemer	Mitsubishi Pajero	+ 6:14'38
5	(France) Kenjiro Shinozuka	(France) Henri Magne	Mitsubishi Pajero	+ 7:02'51
6	(Spain) Salvador Servià	(Spain) Jaime Puig Sans	Lada Samara	+ 8:25'24
7	(France) Alain Ambrosino	(France) Alain Guéhennec	Citroën ZX	+ 11:10'45
8	(Finland) Ari Vatanen	(France) Christian Delférrier	Citroën ZX	+ 11:42'58
9	(Italy) Giacomo Vismara	None	Land Rover Range Rover	+ 15:19'47
10	(France) Jean-Pierre Fontenay	(France) Bruno Musmarra	Mitsubishi Pajero	+ 24:28'44

Notes

- The T2 production class winner was Ake Siriwattanak with a Mitsubishi Pajero.

=== Trucks ===
Position	Driver	Co-driver	Mechanic	Truck
1	(Italy) Francesco Perlini	Giorgio Albiero	Claudio Vinante	Perlini 105 F
2	(France) Jacques Houssat	Patrick Sarliève	Livio Diamante	Perlini 105 F
3	(France) Gilbert Versino	Raphael Gimbre	Christian Versino	Mercedes-Benz 1935
4	(Belgium) Cornelis Bezemer	Heijl Geerts	Daniel Cnudde	MAN
5	(France) Jean-Paul Bosonnet	Serge Lacourt	Marcel Micquiaux	Mercedes-Benz
6	(Japan) Yoshimasa Sugawara	Hideki Shibata	Katsumi Hamura	Hino
7	(Belgium) Joseph Petit	Francis Delimbeuf	Ahmed Hettal	Mercedes-Benz
8	(France) Georges Groine	Laurent Guéguen	Patrice Guerin	Mercedes-Benz
9	(France) Etienne Martinez	Christian Haller	Serge Moncere	Mercedes-Benz
10	(Czech Republic) Ota Měřínský	Vlastimil Buchtyár	Josef Kalina	Tatra
