= 1990 Paris–Dakar Rally =

Off-road motorsport event in France and Africa

1990 Dakar Rally

Seasons
- ← 1989 1991 →

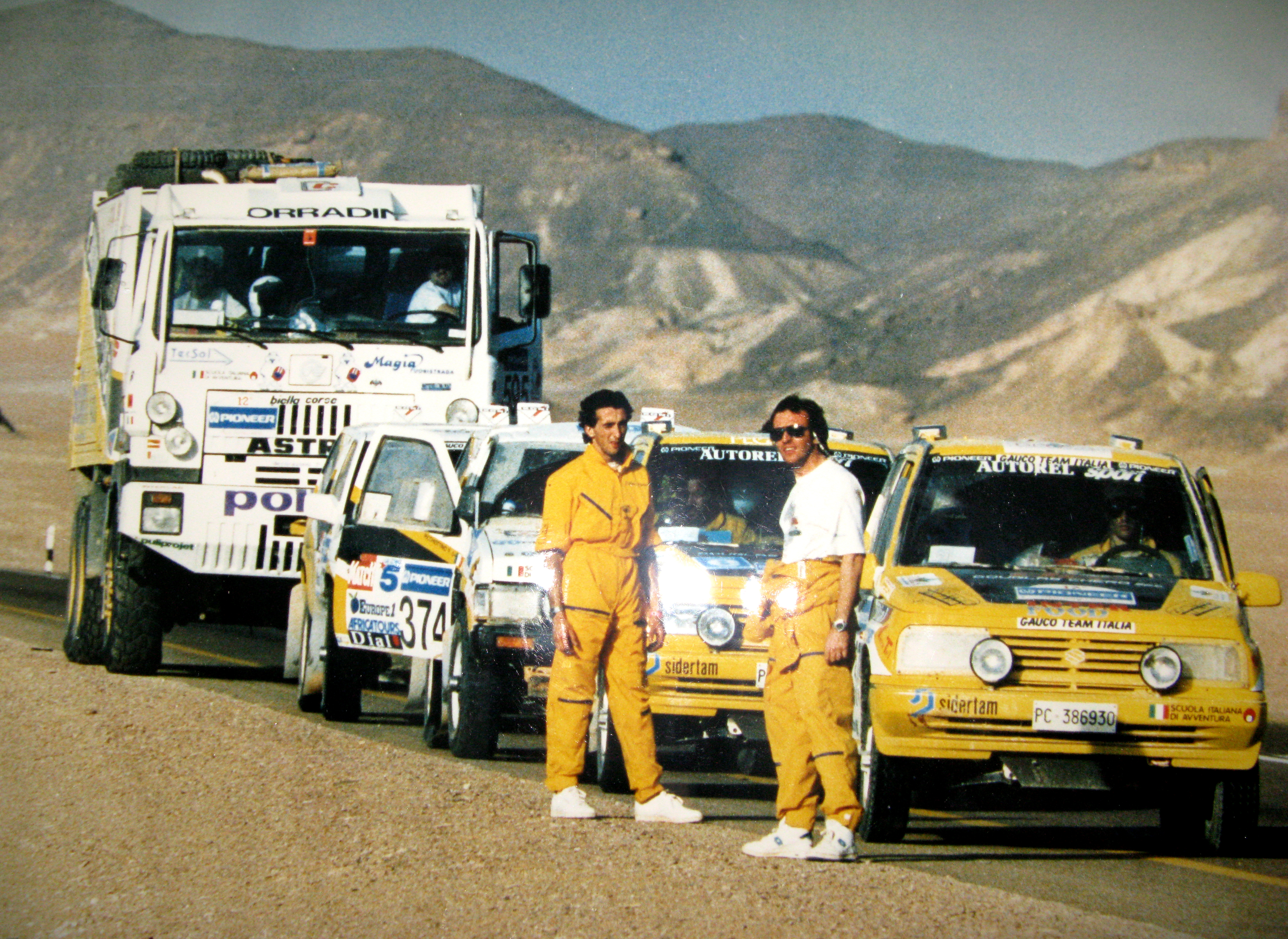
Gianni Lora Lamia Paris-Dakar 1990 Astra Truck BM309

1990 Dakar Rally also known as the 1990 Paris–Dakar Rally was the 12th running of the Dakar Rally event. 465 competitors started from La Défense. The rally was won by 1981 world rally champion, Ari Vatanen, for the third time in four years. The motorcycle class was won by Edi Orioli.

== Stages ==
Stage	Date	Start	Finish	Special (km)	Total (km)
Prologue	25 December	(France) Chevilly		5	
Prologue	26 December	(France) Marseille		3.5	
1	29 December	(Libya) Tripoli	(Libya) Ghadamès	273	539
2	30 December	(Libya) Ghadamès	(Libya) Ghat	609	707
3	31 December	(Libya) Ghat	(Libya) Sabha	446	687
4	1 January	(Libya) Sabha	(Libya) Tumu	641	
5	2 January	(Libya) Tumu	(Niger) Dirkou	504	
6	3 January	(Niger) Dirkou	(Niger) N'Gourti	497	
7	4 January	(Niger) N'Gourti	(Chad) N'Djamena	499	647
8	5 January	(Chad) N'Djamena	(Niger) N'Guigmi	425	483
9	6 January	(Niger) N'Guigmi	(Niger) Agadez	780	
Rest	7 January				
10	8 January	(Niger) Agadez	(Niger) Tahoua	198	483
11	9 January	(Niger) Tahoua	(Niger) Niamey	222	431
12	10 January	(Niger) Niamey	(Mali) Gao	492	638
13	11 January	(Mali) Gao	(Mali) Tombouctou	412	
14	12 January	(Mali) Tombouctou	(Mauritania) Néma	674	
15	13 January	(Mauritania) Néma	(Mauritania) Tidjikja	458	738
16	14 January	(Mauritania) Tidjikja	(Mali) Kayes	485	685
17	15 January	(Mali) Kayes	(Senegal) Saint Louis	200	838
18	16 January	(Senegal) Saint Louis	(Senegal) Dakar	40	227
Total				8,564	11,420

== Stage Winners ==
Stage	Cars		Bikes	
Prologue	(France) Claude Arnoux	Citroën	(France) Laurent Charbonnel	Husqvarna
Prologue	(France) Pierre Lartigue	Mitsubishi	(France) Laurent Charbonnel	Husqvarna
1	(Finland) Ari Vatanen	Peugeot	(Spain) Jordi Arcarons	Cagiva
2	(Finland) Ari Vatanen	Peugeot	(Italy) Edi Orioli	Cagiva
3	(Finland) Ari Vatanen	Peugeot	(France) Gilles Picard	Yamaha
4	(Finland) Ari Vatanen	Peugeot	(Italy) Alessandro De Petri	Cagiva
5	(Sweden) Björn Waldegård	Peugeot	(Italy) Alessandro De Petri	Cagiva
6	(France) Alain Ambrosino	Peugeot	(Italy) Alessandro De Petri	Cagiva
7	(Finland) Ari Vatanen	Peugeot	(Italy) Alessandro De Petri	Cagiva
8	(Finland) Ari Vatanen	Peugeot	(France) Stephane Peterhansel	Yamaha
9	(Japan) Kenjiro Shinozuka	Mitsubishi	(Italy) Edi Orioli	Cagiva
10	(Sweden) Björn Waldegård	Peugeot	(Italy) Alessandro De Petri	Cagiva
11	(Finland) Ari Vatanen	Peugeot	(Spain) Carlos Mas Samora	Yamaha
12	(Japan) Kenjiro Shinozuka	Mitsubishi	(Spain) Jordi Arcarons	Cagiva
13	(France) Philippe Wambergue	Peugeot	(France) Gilles Picard	Yamaha
14	(Sweden) Björn Waldegård	Peugeot	(Italy) Alessandro De Petri	Cagiva
15	(Belgium) Jacky Ickx	Lada	(Italy) Roberto Mandelli	Gilera
16	(France) Philippe Wambergue	Peugeot	(France) Gilles Picard	Yamaha
16	(France) Philippe Wambergue	Peugeot	(France) Gilles Picard	Yamaha
17	(United Kingdom) Andrew Cowan	Mitsubishi	(Belgium) Gaston Rahier	Suzuki
18	(France) Philippe Wambergue	Peugeot	(Italy) Franco Picco	Yamaha
