= 1995 Granada–Dakar Rally =

Off-road motorsport event in Spain and Africa

1995 Dakar Rally
← Previous event	Next event →
- Host country: Spain; Morocco; Mauritania; Guinea; Senegal
- Dates run: 1 January 1995–15 January 1995
- Stages: 14 (5,725 km; 3,557 mi)
- Overall distance: 10,109 km (6,281 mi)

Results
- Cars winner: (France) Pierre Lartigue (France) Michel Perin; Citroën
- Bikes winner: (France) Stéphane Peterhansel; Yamaha
- Trucks winner: (Czech Republic) Karel Loprais (Czech Republic) Radomír Stachura (Czech Republic) Josef Kalina; Tatra 815

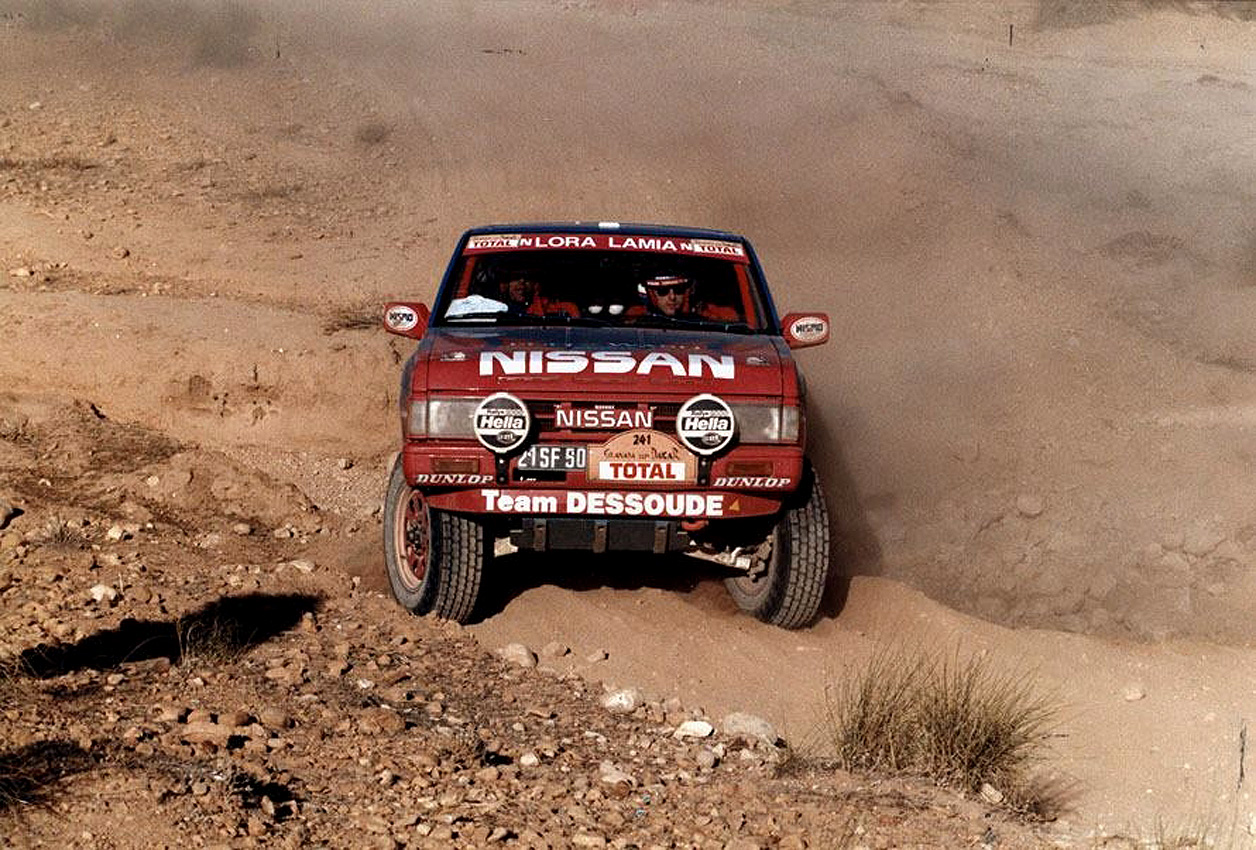
Gianni Lora Lamia Granada-Dakar 1995 Nissan Terrano Team Dessoude

1995 Dakar Rally also known as the 1995 Paris-Dakar Rally was the 17th running of the Dakar Rally event. The race began outside France for the first time, at Granada in Spain. Pierre Lartigue won the car class for the second year in succession and Stephane Peterhansel won his fourth motorcycle title. Karel Loprais won the truck title in a Tatra 815.

== Stages ==
Stage	Date	From	To	Total (km)	Special (km)	Stage winners				
Stage	Date	From	To	Total (km)	Special (km)	Bikes		Cars		Trucks
1	1 January	(Spain) Granada	(Spain) Motril	275	170	(Austria) Heinz Kinigadner	KTM	(Finland) Timo Salonen	Citroên	
2	2 January	(Morocco) Nador	(Morocco) Errachidia	619	226	(United States) Danny Laporte	Yamaha	(France) Bruno Saby	Mitsubishi	
3	3 January	(Morocco) Errachidia	(Morocco) Ouarzazate	574	405	(Austria) Heinz Kinigadner	KTM	(Finland) Ari Vatanen	Citroên	
4	4 January	(Morocco) Ouarzazate	(Morocco) Guelmim [Goulimine]	646	380	(Austria) Heinz Kinigadner	KTM	(France) Jean-Pierre Fontenay	Mitsubishi	
5	5 January	(Morocco) Guelmim [Goulimine]	(Morocco) / (Sahrawi Arab Democratic Republic) [Es] Smara	486	408	(Austria) Heinz Kinigadner	KTM	(France) Bruno Saby	Mitsubishi	
6	6 January	(Morocco) / (Sahrawi Arab Democratic Republic) [Es] Smara	(Morocco) / (Sahrawi Arab Democratic Republic) Aousserd [Aswerd]	585	577	(Spain) Jordi Arcarons	Cagiva	(Finland) Ari Vatanen	Citroên	
7	7 January	(Morocco) / (Sahrawi Arab Democratic Republic) Aousserd [Aswerd]	(Mauritania) Zouérat	628	625	(France) Thierry Magnaldi	Yamaha	(Finland) Ari Vatanen	Citroên	
	8 January	(Mauritania) Zouérat		Rest day						
8	9 January	(Mauritania) Zouérat	(Mauritania) Chinguetti	514	504	(Spain) Oscar Gallardo	Cagiva	(France) Pierre Lartigue	Citroên	
9	10 January	(Mauritania) Chinguetti	(Mauritania) Tidjikja	348	347	(Netherlands) Gerard Jimmink	Cagiva	(France) Jean-Pierre Fontenay	Mitsubishi	
10	11 January	(Mauritania) Tidjikja	(Mauritania) Ayoun El Atrous	429	375	(France) Stéphane Peterhansel	Yamaha	(France) Pierre Lartigue	Citroên	
11	12 January	(Mauritania) Ayoun El Atrous	(Senegal) Bakel		393	(Austria) Heinz Kinigadner	KTM	(Spain) Salvador Servià	Citroên	
12	13 January	(Senegal) Bakel	(Guinea) Labe	632	626	(France) Stéphane Peterhansel	Yamaha	(France) Pierre Lartigue	Citroên	
13	14 January	(Guinea) Labe	(Senegal) Tambacounda	820	600	(France) Stéphane Peterhansel	Yamaha	(France) Jean-Pierre Fontenay	Mitsubishi	
14	15 January	(Senegal) Tambacounda	(Senegal) Dakar		380	(France) Stéphane Peterhansel	Yamaha	(France) Bruno Saby	Mitsubishi	
