= 2008 Dakar Rally =

Cancelled off-road motorsport event in Europe and Africa

The 2008 Dakar Rally would have been the 30th running of the annual off-road race. The rally was to start in Lisbon, Portugal on 5 January 2008, running through Europe and Africa until the finish in Dakar, Senegal on 20 January. The event was cancelled one day before the intended start date, due to concerns over a possible terrorist attack aimed at the competitors.

== Postponement and Relocation ==
The rally was cancelled on 4 January 2008, due to safety concerns in Mauritania, following the killing of four French tourists there on Christmas Eve, December 2007. France-based Amaury Sport Organisation (ASO), in charge of the 6,000 km (3,730 mi) rally, said in a statement they had been advised by the French government to cancel the race. They said direct threats had also been made against the event by "terrorist organizations". Before the start of the race, rally director Étienne Lavigne had approved the Mauritanian legs only after two stages planned for Mali were scrapped. An Al-Qaeda affiliate organization was blamed for the cancellation.

On 4 February 2008, the ASO organised the Central Europe Rally, with a Hungary to Romania route, to occupy the gap left by the cancellation of the event, as part of the new Dakar Series. The event only lasted one year. The Dakar Rally was relocated to South America from 2009 until 2019, and in 2020 the event moved to Saudi Arabia.

== Entrants ==
As of December 2007, entrants included 245 motorbikes, 20 quads, 205 cars, and 100 trucks. A total of 570 teams from various 50 countries were entered, up from 510 in 2007.

All entries were deferred to the Central Europe Rally. 110 motorbikes, 19 quads, 91 cars, and 40 trucks started the Central Europe Rally.

== Route ==
The race would have begun in Lisbon, Portugal, and passed through Spain, Morocco, Western Sahara, Mauritania, and Senegal. The total race distance would have been 9,273 km (5,762 mi), of which 5,732 km (3,562 mi) was timed special stage. There would have been a rest day in Nouakchott on 13 January.

=== Planned stages ===
Stage	Date	From	To	Connection		Special		Connection		Total	
Stage	Date	From	To	km	mi	km	mi	km	mi	km	mi
1	5 January	(Portugal) Lisbon	(Portugal) Portimão	104	65	120	75	262	163	486	302
2	6 January	(Portugal) Portimão	(Spain) Málaga	15	9	60	37	460	286	535	332
3	7 January	(Morocco) Nador	(Morocco) Er Rachidia	182	113	372	231	16	10	717	446
4	8 January	(Morocco) Er Rachidia	(Morocco) Ouarzazate	29	18	356	221	199	124	584	363
5	9 January	(Morocco) Ouarzazate	(Morocco) Guelmim	188	117	498	309	148	92	834	518
6	10 January	(Morocco) Guelmim	(Morocco) Smara†	66	41	454	282	105	65	625	388
7	11 January	(Morocco) Smara†	(Mauritania) Atar	198	123	619	385	12	7	829	515
8	12 January	(Mauritania) Atar	(Mauritania) Nouakchott	44	27	450	280	37	23	531	330
—N/a	13 January	(Mauritania) Nouakchott		Rest day							
9	14 January	(Mauritania) Nouakchott	(Mauritania) Nouadhibou	37	23	525	326	86	53	648	403
10	15 January	(Mauritania) Nouadhibou	(Mauritania) Atar	111	69	552	343	22	14	685	426
11	16 January	(Mauritania) Atar	(Mauritania) Tidjikja	35	22	524	326	133	83	692	430
12	17 January	(Mauritania) Tidjikja	(Mauritania) Kiffa	131	81	398	247	2	1	531	330
13	18 January	(Mauritania) Kiffa	(Mauritania) Kiffa	25	16	484	301	6	4	515	320
14	19 January	(Mauritania) Kiffa	(Senegal) Saint-Louis	326	203	301	187	130	81	757	470
15	20 January	(Senegal) Saint-Louis	(Senegal) Dakar	239	149	23	14	42	26	304	189
				km	mi	km	mi	km	mi	km	mi

†Smara is located in the Moroccan-administered portion of the Western Sahara
