= 1996 Granada–Dakar Rally =

Off-road motorsport event in Spain and Africa

1996 Dakar Rally
← Previous event	Next event →
- Host country: Spain; Morocco; Mauritania; Mali; Guinea; Senegal
- Dates run: 29 December 1995–14 December 1996
- Stages: 16

Results
- Cars winner: (France) Pierre Lartigue (France) Michel Perin; Citroën
- Bikes winner: (Italy) Edi Orioli; Yamaha
- Trucks winner: (Russia) Viktor Moskovskikh (Russia) Anatoliy Kouzmine; Kamaz 49252

1996 Dakar Rally, also known as the 1996 Paris-Dakar Rally, was the 18th running of the Dakar Rally event. It began on 29 December 1995 with a prologue stage in Granada, Spain - the second successive year the event began away from the traditional starting point of Paris - and ended in the Senegalese capital of Dakar on 14 January 1996. Pierre Lartigue won the car class for the third year in succession for Citroën and Edi Orioli won his fourth motorcycle title for Yamaha. Viktor Moskovskikh secured the first trucks class title for the Russian Kamaz marque.

== Stages ==
Stage	Date	From	To	Total (km)	Stage winners	
Stage	Date	From	To	Total (km)	Bikes	Cars
P	29 December	(Spain) Granada		0.3	(Spain) J. Arcarons	(Japan) K. Shinozuka
1	30 December	(Spain) Granada	(Spain) Málaga	4	(Finland) K. Tiainen	(France) B. Saby
2	31 December	(Morocco) Nador	(Morocco) Oujda	149	(Austria) H. Kinigadner	(Finland) A. Vatanen
3	1 January	(Morocco) Oujda	(Morocco) Er-Rachidia	328	(France) S. Peterhansel	(Finland) A. Vatanen
4	2 January	(Morocco) Er-Rachidia	(Morocco) Fam El Hisn	540	(France) S. Peterhansel	(France) P. Wambergue
5	3 January	(Morocco) Fam El Hisn	(Morocco) Smara	474	(France) S. Peterhansel	(France) P. Lartigue
6	4 January	(Morocco) Smara	(Mauritania) Zouerat	603	(Italy) E. Orioli	(France) J-P. Fontenay
7	5 January	(Mauritania) Zouerat	(Mauritania) Atar	365	(France) T. Magnaldi	(Finland) A. Vatanen
8	6 January	(Mauritania) Atar	(Mauritania) Zouerat	511	(Italy) F. Meoni	(Japan) H. Masuoka
	7 January	(Mauritania) Zouerat		Rest day		
9	8 January	(Mauritania) Zouerat	(Mauritania) El Mreiti	629	(Spain) J. Arcarons	(France) P. Wambergue
10	9 January	(Mauritania) El Mreiti	(Mauritania) Tichit	632	(Italy) D. Trolli	(Finland) A. Vatanen
11	10 January	(Mauritania) Tichit	(Mauritania) Kiffa	530	(Italy) E. Orioli	(France) J-P. Fontenay
12	11 January	(Mauritania) Kiffa	(Mali) Kayes	275	(Italy) D. Trolli	(France) P. Wambergue
13	12 January	(Mali) Kayes	(Guinea) Labe	516	(Italy) F. Meoni	(Finland) A. Vatanen
14	13 January	(Guinea) Labe	(Senegal) Tambacounda	620	(Italy) F. Meoni	(Finland) A. Vatanen
15	14 January	(Senegal) Tambacounda	(Senegal) Dakar	20	(Spain) J. Arcarons	(Finland) A. Vatanen

== Final standings ==
=== Motorcycles ===
Pos	No.	Rider	Bike	Entrant	Time
1	3	(Italy) Edi Orioli	Yamaha	Yamaha Belgarda-Mobil 1	72:31:03
2	2	(Spain) Jordi Arcarons	KTM	Lucky Strike-KTM	+1:05:45
3	20	(Spain) Carlos Sotelo	KTM	Lucky Strike-KTM	+5:48:09
4	12	(Netherlands) Gerard Jimmink	KTM		+6:44:53
5	17	(France) Richard Sainct	KTM	Gauloises Blondes-KTM	+7:35:38
6	29	(Italy) Guido Maletti	Kawasaki	Kawasaki Italy	+11:18:23
7	65	(Spain) Oscar Gallardo	Cagiva	Pelayo Mutua de Seguros	+11:33:12
8	134	(Italy) Massimo Chiesa	KTM		+12:23:44
9	57	(Germany) Norbert Schilcher	KTM		+12:38:08
10	35	(France) Marcel Pilet	KTM	AO American Optical	+13:34:39

=== Cars ===
Pos	No.	Driver	Co-Driver	Car	Entrant	Time
1	201	(France) Pierre Lartigue	(France) Michel Perin	Citroën	Citroën Sport	65:44:38
2	207	(France) Philippe Wambergue	(United Kingdom) Fred Gallagher	Citroën	Citroën Sport	+1:11:54
3	206	(France) Jean-Pierre Fontenay	(France) Bruno Musmarra	Mitsubishi	Sonauto Mitsubishi	+1:42:13
4	203	(Finland) Ari Vatanen	(France) Gilles Picard	Citroën	Citroën Sport	+1:49:53
5	205	(Spain) Salvador Servia	(Spain) Jaime Puig	Citroën	Citroën Sport	+3:16:45
6	208	(Japan) Hiroshi Masuoka	(Germany) Andreas Schulz	Mitsubishi	Sonauto Mitsubishi	+6:26:20
7	202	(France) Bruno Saby	(France) Dominique Serieys	Mitsubishi	Sonauto Mitsubishi	+11:06:06
8	216	(Italy) Giacomo Vismara	(Italy) Mario Cambiaghi	Ssangyong	Ssangyong Motor	+20:22:40
9	209	(France) Thierry Delavergne	(France) Luis Arguelles	Nissan	Team Dessoude	+21:17:09
10	212	(France) Jean-Pierre Strugo	(France) Bruno Catarelli	Mitsubishi		+23:38:51
