= 1988 Paris–Dakar Rally =

Off-road motorsport event in Europe and Africa

1988 Dakar Rally

Seasons
- ← 1987 1989 →

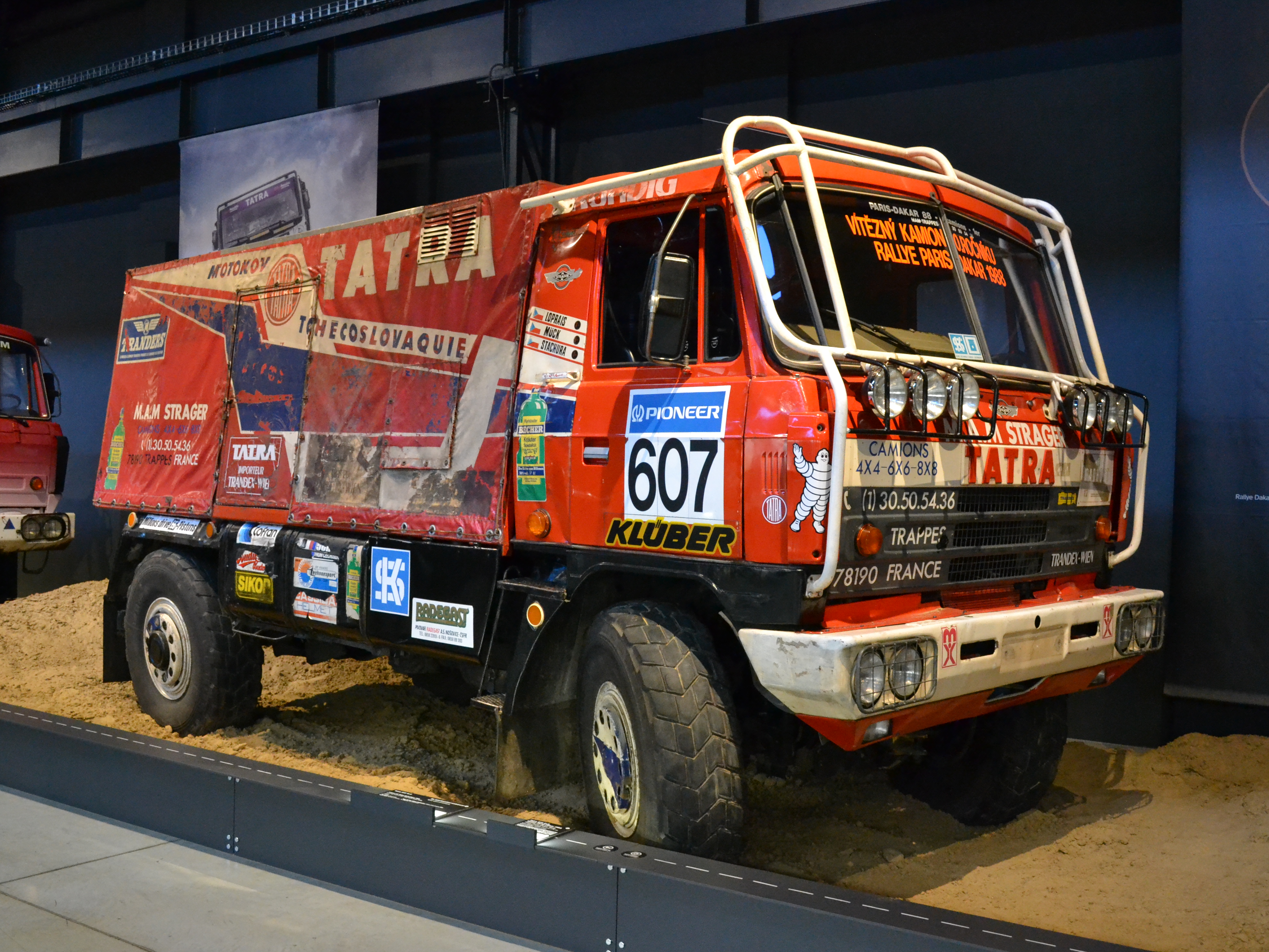
Tatra 815 4x4, winner in the truck competition

1988 Dakar Rally also known as the 1988 Paris–Dakar Rally was the 10th running of the Dakar Rally event. 311 cars, 183 motorcycles, and 109 trucks started the rally. The rally was won by Juha Kankkunen, the motorcycle category was won by Edi Orioli, and the truck category was won by Karel Loprais on a Tatra 815. The event was marred by the death of six people, three participants, a mother and child killed in Mauritania when a camera car ran into a group of spectators, and a 10-year-old girl killed crossing the road in Mali.

In addition, the rally leader Ari Vatanen's Peugeot 405 was allegedly stolen in Bamako, and would only be returned if a ransom of 25 million francs CFA was paid. The car was eventually found, but it was too late to rejoin the race.

== Final standings ==
=== Trucks ===
Pos	No.	Driver	Co-Drivers	Truck	Time
1	607	(Czechoslovakia) Karel Loprais	(Czechoslovakia) Radomir Stachura (Czechoslovakia) Tomáš Mück	Tatra	-
2	617	(Czechoslovakia) Jiří Moskal	(Czechoslovakia) František Vojtíšek (Czechoslovakia) Pavel Záleský	LIAZ	+?
3	606	(West Germany) Lutz Bernau	(West Germany) Bartman (West Germany) Kluge	MAN	+?
