= 1989 Paris–Dakar Rally =

Off-road motorsport event in Europe and Africa

1989 Dakar Rally

Seasons
- ← 1988 1990 →

The 1989 Dakar Rally, also known as the 1989 Paris–Dakar Rally, was the 11th running of the Dakar Rally event. The course went through Libya for the first time. A record 209 of the 473 competitors completed the rally. The result of the rally was controversially decided by Peugeot Talbot Sport boss Jean Todt who decided the result on the toss of a coin in order to end the rivalry between the drivers, of which he feared their safety. The rally was won by 1981 world rally champion Ari Vatanen. The motorcycle class was won by Gilles Lalay.
