= Giletti =

Giletti is a surname of Italian origin. Notable people with the surname include:

- Alain Giletti (born 1939), French figure skater
- Emilio Giletti (1929–2020), Italian racing driver
- Massimo Giletti (born 1962), Italian television host and journalist
