= 1999 Granada–Dakar Rally =

Off-road motorsport event in Spain and Africa

1999 Dakar Rally
← Previous event	Next event →
- Host country: Spain; Morocco; Mauritania; Mali; Burkina Faso; Senegal
- Dates run: 31 December 1998–17 January 1999
- Stages: 17

Results
- Cars winner: (France) Jean-Louis Schlesser (France) Philippe Monnet; Schlesser-Renault
- Bikes winner: (France) Richard Sainct; BMW
- Trucks winner: (Czech Republic) Karel Loprais (Czech Republic) Radomír Stachura (Czech Republic) Josef Kalina; Tatra 815

The 1999 Dakar Rally, also known as the 1999 Granada–Dakar Rally, was the 21st running of the Dakar Rally event. After a short prologue stage on New Year's Eve 1998, the race began in earnest on 1 January 1999 and ended on 17 January after 16 competitive stages. After the fifth stage, the overall rally leader was German driver, Jutta Kleinschmidt, who, in the 1998 rally, was the first woman to ever win a stage of the rally. The event was marked by a robbery on the 12th stage of the rally between Néma and Tichit in Mauritania of fifty competitors by armed men, in which vehicles, money and petrol were stolen. Rally co-ordinators decided to continue with the race. The rally was won by French driver Jean-Louis Schlesser. The motorcycle title was won by Richard Sainct, whilst the truck title went to Karel Loprais in a Tatra 815.

== Stages ==
Stage	Date	From	To	Total (km)	Stage winners		
Stage	Date	From	To	Total (km)	Bikes	Cars	Trucks
P	31 December	(Spain) Granada		5	(Germany) D. von Zitzewitz	(Japan) K. Shinozuka	Stage not held
1	1 January	(Spain) Granada	(Morocco) Rabat	5	(Germany) D. von Zitzewitz	(Spain) M. Prieto	(Russia) V. Moskovskikh
2	2 January	(Morocco) Rabat	(Morocco) Agadir	100	(Austria) H. Kinigadner	(France) J-P. Fontenay	(Brazil) A. de Azevedo
3	3 January	(Morocco) Agadir	(Morocco) Tan-Tan	230	(Spain) N. Roma	(Germany) J. Kleinschmidt	(Russia) F. Kabirov
4	4 January	(Morocco) Tan-Tan	(Mauritania) Bir Moghrein	451	(Spain) O. Gallardo	(Spain) J. M. Servia	(Russia) F. Kabirov
5	5 January	(Mauritania) Bir Moghrein	(Mauritania) Atar	624	(Spain) J. Arcarons	(Japan) K. Shinozuka	(Japan) Y. Sugawara
6	6 January	(Mauritania) Atar	(Mauritania) Tidjikja	458	(Slovakia) J. Katriňák	(Spain) J. M. Servia	(Russia) V. Moskovskikh
7	7 January	(Mauritania) Tidjikja	(Mali) Nioro	434	(Italy) F. Meoni	(Spain) M. Prieto	(Russia) F. Kabirov
8	8 January	(Mali) Nioro	(Burkina Faso) Bobo Dioulasso	434	Stage cancelled	(Spain) M. Prieto	(Russia) V. Moskovskikh
	9 January	(Burkina Faso) Bobo Dioulasso		Rest day			
9	10 January	(Burkina Faso) Bobo Dioulasso	(Mali) Mopti	295	(South Africa) A. Cox	(France) J-L. Schlesser	(Brazil) A. de Azevedo
10	11 January	(Mali) Mopti	(Mali) Timbuktu	460	Stage cancelled	(France) J-P. Fontenay	(Russia) F. Kabirov
11	12 January	(Mali) Timbuktu	(Mauritania) Néma	539	(South Africa) A. Cox	(Japan) K. Shinozuka	(Russia) V. Moskovskikh
12	13 January	(Mauritania) Néma	(Mauritania) Tichit	490	(France) R. Sainct	(France) J-L. Schlesser	(Japan) Y. Sugawara
13	14 January	(Mauritania) Tichit	(Mauritania) Atar	579	(France) T. Magnaldi	(Germany) J. Kleinschmidt	(Czech Republic) K. Loprais
14	15 January	(Mauritania) Atar	(Mauritania) Nouakchott	433	(Italy) G. Sala	(Spain) J. M. Servia	(Russia) V. Moskovskikh
15	16 January	(Mauritania) Nouakchott	(Senegal) Saint-Louis	151	(France) R. Sainct	(France) J-P. Fontenay	(Russia) F. Kabirov
16	17 January	(Senegal) Saint-Louis	(Senegal) Dakar	20	Stage cancelled	(Spain) S. Servia	(Russia) V. Moskovskikh (Russia) F. Kabirov

== Stage Results ==
=== Motorcycles ===
	Stage result					General classification				
Stage	Pos	Competitor	Make	Time	Gap	Pos	Competitor	Make	Time	Gap
Prologue	1	(Germany) Dirk von Zitzewitz	KTM	4:34		Stage not counted towards overall classification				
Prologue	2	(Spain) Nani Roma	KTM	4:41	0:07	Stage not counted towards overall classification				
Prologue	3	(Austria) Jurgen Fink	KTM	4:47	0:13	Stage not counted towards overall classification				
1	1	(Germany) Dirk von Zitzewitz	KTM	5:25		1	(Germany) Dirk von Zitzewitz	KTM	5:25	
1	2	(Italy) Giovanni Sala	KTM	5:30	0:05	2	(Italy) Giovanni Sala	KTM	5:30	0:05
1	3	(Germany) Jurgen Mayer	KTM	5:31	0:06	3	(Germany) Jurgen Mayer	KTM	5:31	0:06
1	3	(Spain) Nani Roma	KTM	5:31	0:06	3	(Spain) Nani Roma	KTM	5:31	0:06
2	1	(Austria) Heinz Kinigadner	KTM	1:11:32		1	(Spain) Nani Roma	KTM	1:17:09	
2	2	(Spain) Nani Roma	KTM	1:11:38	0:16	2	(Italy) Fabio Fasola	KTM	1:17:31	0:22
2	3	(Italy) Fabio Fasola	KTM	1:11:58	0:36	3	(Austria) Heinz Kinigadner	KTM	1:17:35	0:26
3	1	(Spain) Nani Roma	KTM	2:14:07		1	(Spain) Nani Roma	KTM	3:31:16	
3	2	(Austria) Heinz Kinigadner	KTM	2:15:10	1:03	2	(Austria) Heinz Kinigadner	KTM	3:32:45	1:29
3	3	(South Africa) Alfie Cox	KTM	2:17:36	3:29	3	(South Africa) Alfie Cox	KTM	3:37:23	6:07
4	1	(Spain) Oscar Gallardo	BMW	4:31:10		1	(Spain) Oscar Gallardo	BMW	8:15:04	
4	2	(Italy) Fabrizio Meoni	KTM	4:33:59	2:49	2	(France) Richard Sainct	BMW	8:17:00	1:56
4	3	(France) Richard Sainct	BMW	4:35:50	4:40	3	(South Africa) Alfie Cox	KTM	8:18:33	3:29
5	1	(Spain) Jordi Arcarons	KTM	6:14:59		1	(Spain) Oscar Gallardo	BMW	14:32:02	
5	2	(Austria) Heinz Kinigadner	KTM	6:15:18	0:19	2	(France) Richard Sainct	BMW	14:32:24	0:22
5	3	(France) Richard Sainct	BMW	6:15:24	0:25	3	(South Africa) Alfie Cox	KTM	14:35:38	3:36
6	1	(Slovakia) Jaroslav Katriňák	KTM	6:52:24		1	(Spain) Oscar Gallardo	BMW	21:28:20	
6	2	(France) Thierry Magnaldi	KTM	6:53:37	1:33	2	(France) Richard Sainct	BMW	21:29:53	1:33
6	3	(Finland) Kari Tiainen	KTM	6:54:53	2:29	3	(South Africa) Alfie Cox	KTM	21:30:54	2:34
7	1	(Italy) Fabrizio Meoni	KTM	6:31:38		1	(France) Richard Sainct	BMW	28:30:31	
7	2	(Finland) Kari Tiainen	KTM	6:41:29	9:51	2	(France) Thierry Magnaldi	KTM	28:36:26	5:55
7	3	(France) Thierry Magnaldi	KTM	6:42:24	10:36	3	(Italy) Fabrizio Meoni	KTM	28:48:24	17:53
8	Stage cancelled									
9	1	(South Africa) Alfie Cox	KTM	3:37:09		1	(France) Richard Sainct	BMW	32:12:58	
9	2	(Chile) Carlo de Gavardo	KTM	3:42:11	5:02	2	(France) Thierry Magnaldi	KTM	32:19:41	6:43
9	3	(Spain) Carlos Soleto	Yamaha	3:42:21	5:12	3	(Italy) Fabrizio Meoni	KTM	32:33:24	20:26
10	Stage cancelled									
11	1	(South Africa) Alfie Cox	KTM	6:04:56		1	(France) Richard Sainct	BMW	38:28:06	
11	2	(Finland) Kari Tiainen	KTM	6:08:12	3:16	2	(France) Thierry Magnaldi	KTM	38:30:07	2:01
11	3	(France) Thierry Magnaldi	KTM	6:10:26	5:30	3	(Italy) Fabrizio Meoni	KTM	38:44:19	16:13
12	1	(France) Richard Sainct	BMW	6:36:11		1	(France) Richard Sainct	BMW	45:04:17	
12	2	(Italy) Fabrizio Meoni	KTM	6:37:55	1:44	2	(France) Thierry Magnaldi	KTM	45:08:58	4:41
12	3	(France) Thierry Magnaldi	KTM	6:38:51	2:40	3	(Italy) Fabrizio Meoni	KTM	45:22:14	17:57
13	1	(France) Thierry Magnaldi	KTM	7:56:51		1	(France) Richard Sainct	BMW	53:02:57	
13	2	(France) Richard Sainct	BMW	7:58:40	1:49	2	(France) Thierry Magnaldi	KTM	53:05:49	2:52
13	3	(Spain) Jordi Arcarons	KTM	8:03:51	7:00	3	(Italy) Fabrizio Meoni	KTM	53:31:00	28:03
14	1	(Italy) Giovanni Sala	KTM	4:33:16		1	(France) Richard Sainct	BMW	57:39:01	
14	2	(Italy) Fabrizio Meoni	KTM	4:33:38	0:22	2	(France) Thierry Magnaldi	KTM	57:42:39	3:38
14	3	(South Africa) Alfie Cox	KTM	4:35:02	1:46	3	(Italy) Fabrizio Meoni	KTM	58:04:38	25:37
15	1	(France) Richard Sainct	BMW	1:05:58		1	(France) Richard Sainct	BMW	58:44:59	
15	2	(France) Thierry Magnaldi	KTM	1:06:29	0:31	2	(France) Thierry Magnaldi	KTM	58:49:08	4:09
15	3	(Spain) Carlos Soleto	Yamaha	1:07:19	1:21	3	(South Africa) Alfie Cox	KTM	59:26:18	41:19
16	Stage cancelled									

=== Cars ===
	Stage result					General classification				
Stage	Pos	Competitor	Make	Time	Gap	Pos	Competitor	Make	Time	Gap
Prologue	1	(Japan) Kenjiro Shinozuka (Andorra) Henri Magne	Mitsubishi	5:11		Stage not counted towards overall classification				
Prologue	2	(France) Jean-Louis Schlesser (France) Philippe Monnet	Schlesser-Renault	5:15	0:04	Stage not counted towards overall classification				
Prologue	2	(France) Jean-Pierre Fontenay (France) Gilles Picard	Mitsubishi	5:15	0:04	Stage not counted towards overall classification				
1	1	(Spain) Miguel Prieto (France) Dominique Serieys	Mitsubishi	5:47		1	(Spain) Miguel Prieto (France) Dominique Serieys	Mitsubishi	5:47	
1	2	(Japan) Kenjiro Shinozuka (Andorra) Henri Magne	Mitsubishi	5:50	0:03	2	(Japan) Kenjiro Shinozuka (Andorra) Henri Magne	Mitsubishi	5:50	0:03
1	3	(France) Jean-Pierre Fontenay (France) Gilles Picard	Mitsubishi	5:54	0:07	3	(France) Jean-Pierre Fontenay (France) Gilles Picard	Mitsubishi	5:54	0:07
2	1	(France) Jean-Pierre Fontenay (France) Gilles Picard	Mitsubishi	1:13:22		1	(France) Jean-Pierre Fontenay (France) Gilles Picard	Mitsubishi	1:19:16	
2	2	(Japan) Kenjiro Shinozuka (Andorra) Henri Magne	Mitsubishi	1:15:11	1:49	2	(Japan) Kenjiro Shinozuka (Andorra) Henri Magne	Mitsubishi	1:21:01	1:45
2	3	(Spain) Miguel Prieto (France) Dominique Serieys	Mitsubishi	1:16:28	3:02	3	(Spain) Miguel Prieto (France) Dominique Serieys	Mitsubishi	1:21:11	2:55
3	1	(Germany) Jutta Kleinschmidt (Sweden) Tina Thörner	Mitsubishi	2:20:26		1	(Germany) Jutta Kleinschmidt (Sweden) Tina Thörner	Mitsubishi	3:43:17	
3	2	(Japan) Hiroshi Masuoka (Germany) Andreas Schulz	Mitsubishi	2:22:44	2:18	2	(Japan) Hiroshi Masuoka (Germany) Andreas Schulz	Mitsubishi	3:45:12	1:55
3	3	(France) Jean-Louis Schlesser (France) Philippe Monnet	Schlesser-Renault	2:24:33	4:07	3	(France) Jean-Louis Schlesser (France) Philippe Monnet	Schlesser-Renault	3:49:17	6:00
4	1	(Spain) José Maria Servia (France) Thierry Delli Zotti	Schlesser-Renault	4:18:11		1	(Germany) Jutta Kleinschmidt (Sweden) Tina Thörner	Mitsubishi	8:04:47	
4	2	(Germany) Jutta Kleinschmidt (Sweden) Tina Thörner	Mitsubishi	4:21:30	3:19	2	(Spain) José Maria Servia (France) Thierry Delli Zotti	Schlesser-Renault	8:10:53	6:06
4	3	(France) Jean-Louis Schlesser (France) Philippe Monnet	Schlesser-Renault	4:23:58	5:47	3	(France) Jean-Louis Schlesser (France) Philippe Monnet	Schlesser-Renault	8:13:15	8:28
5	1	(Japan) Kenjiro Shinozuka (Andorra) Henri Magne	Mitsubishi	6:14:32		1	(Germany) Jutta Kleinschmidt (Sweden) Tina Thörner	Mitsubishi	14:35:38	
5	2	(Spain) Miguel Prieto (France) Dominique Serieys	Mitsubishi	6:29:26	14:54	2	(Spain) José Maria Servia (France) Thierry Delli Zotti	Schlesser-Renault	14:45:51	10:13
5	3	(Germany) Jutta Kleinschmidt (Sweden) Tina Thörner	Mitsubishi	6:30:51	16:19	3	(France) Jean-Louis Schlesser (France) Philippe Monnet	Schlesser-Renault	14:47:37	11:59
6	1	(Spain) José Maria Servia (France) Thierry Delli Zotti	Schlesser-Renault	6:58:50		1	(Spain) José Maria Servia (France) Thierry Delli Zotti	Schlesser-Renault	21:44:49	
6	2	(France) Jean-Louis Schlesser (France) Philippe Monnet	Schlesser-Renault	7:03:33	4:43	2	(France) Jean-Louis Schlesser (France) Philippe Monnet	Schlesser-Renault	21:51:18	6:29
6	3	(Spain) Miguel Prieto (France) Dominique Serieys	Mitsubishi	7:04:45	5:55	3	(Germany) Jutta Kleinschmidt (Sweden) Tina Thörner	Mitsubishi	21:59:08	14:19
7	1	(Spain) Miguel Prieto (France) Dominique Serieys	Mitsubishi	6:40:28		1	(France) Jean-Louis Schlesser (France) Philippe Monnet	Schlesser-Renault	28:44:32	
7	2	(France) Jean-Louis Schlesser (France) Philippe Monnet	Schlesser-Renault	6:53:14	12:46	2	(Germany) Jutta Kleinschmidt (Sweden) Tina Thörner	Mitsubishi	28:59:39	15:07
7	3	(Germany) Jutta Kleinschmidt (Sweden) Tina Thörner	Mitsubishi	7:00:31	20:03	3	(Spain) Miguel Prieto (France) Dominique Serieys	Mitsubishi	29:04:05	20:03
8	1	(Spain) Miguel Prieto (France) Dominique Serieys	Mitsubishi	4:56:34		1	(France) Jean-Louis Schlesser (France) Philippe Monnet	Schlesser-Renault	33:58:59	
8	2	(France) Thierry Delavergne (France) Jacky Dubois	Nissan	4:57:11	0:37	2	(Spain) Miguel Prieto (France) Dominique Serieys	Mitsubishi	34:01:09	2:10
8	3	(France) Jean-Pierre Fontenay (France) Gilles Picard	Mitsubishi	4:58:43	2:09	3	(Germany) Jutta Kleinschmidt (Sweden) Tina Thörner	Mitsubishi	34:04:39	5:40
9	1	(France) Jean-Louis Schlesser (France) Philippe Monnet	Schlesser-Renault	3:43:08		1	(France) Jean-Louis Schlesser (France) Philippe Monnet	Schlesser-Renault	37:42:07	
9	2	(Japan) Kenjiro Shinozuka (Andorra) Henri Magne	Mitsubishi	3:50:12	7:04	2	(Spain) Miguel Prieto (France) Dominique Serieys	Mitsubishi	37:51:32	9:25
9	3	(Spain) Miguel Prieto (France) Dominique Serieys	Mitsubishi	3:50:23	7:15	3	(Germany) Jutta Kleinschmidt (Sweden) Tina Thörner	Mitsubishi	38:03:43	21:36
10	1	(France) Jean-Pierre Fontenay (France) Gilles Picard	Mitsubishi	4:17:11		1	(France) Jean-Louis Schlesser (France) Philippe Monnet	Schlesser-Renault	42:04:33	
10	2	(Spain) Miguel Prieto (France) Dominique Serieys	Mitsubishi	4:21:26	4:15	2	(Spain) Miguel Prieto (France) Dominique Serieys	Mitsubishi	42:12:59	8:25
10	3	(France) Jean-Louis Schlesser (France) Philippe Monnet	Schlesser-Renault	4:22:26	5:15	3	(Germany) Jutta Kleinschmidt (Sweden) Tina Thörner	Mitsubishi	42:49:50	45:17
11	1	(Japan) Kenjiro Shinozuka (Andorra) Henri Magne	Mitsubishi	6:05:31		1	(France) Jean-Louis Schlesser (France) Philippe Monnet	Schlesser-Renault	48:18:11	
11	2	(Spain) José Maria Servia (France) Thierry Delli Zotti	Schlesser-Renault	6:06:37	1:06	2	(Spain) Miguel Prieto (France) Dominique Serieys	Mitsubishi	48:27:08	8:57
11	3	(France) Jean-Louis Schlesser (France) Philippe Monnet	Schlesser-Renault	6:13:38	8:07	3	(Germany) Jutta Kleinschmidt (Sweden) Tina Thörner	Mitsubishi	49:04:35	46:24
12	1	(France) Jean-Louis Schlesser (France) Philippe Monnet	Schlesser-Renault	7:09:23		1	(France) Jean-Louis Schlesser (France) Philippe Monnet	Schlesser-Renault	55:27:34	
12	2	(Spain) José Maria Servia (France) Thierry Delli Zotti	Schlesser-Renault	7:13:19	3:56	2	(Spain) Miguel Prieto (France) Dominique Serieys	Mitsubishi	55:48:01	20:27
12	3	(Japan) Kenjiro Shinozuka (Andorra) Henri Magne	Mitsubishi	7:16:52	7:29	3	(Germany) Jutta Kleinschmidt (Sweden) Tina Thörner	Mitsubishi	56:59:14	1:31:40
13	1	(Germany) Jutta Kleinschmidt (Sweden) Tina Thörner	Mitsubishi	8:43:56		1	(France) Jean-Louis Schlesser (France) Philippe Monnet	Schlesser-Renault	64:12:52	
13	2	(France) Jean-Louis Schlesser (France) Philippe Monnet	Schlesser-Renault	8:45:18	1:22	2	(Spain) Miguel Prieto (France) Dominique Serieys	Mitsubishi	64:39:24	26:32
13	3	(Spain) Miguel Prieto (France) Dominique Serieys	Mitsubishi	8:51:23	7:27	3	(Germany) Jutta Kleinschmidt (Sweden) Tina Thörner	Mitsubishi	65:43:10	1:30:18
14	1	(Spain) José Maria Servia (France) Thierry Delli Zotti	Schlesser-Renault	4:37:29		1	(France) Jean-Louis Schlesser (France) Philippe Monnet	Schlesser-Renault	68:55:31	
14	2	(France) Jean-Pierre Fontenay (France) Gilles Picard	Mitsubishi	4:41:43	4:14	2	(Spain) Miguel Prieto (France) Dominique Serieys	Mitsubishi	69:23:17	27:46
14	3	(France) Jean-Louis Schlesser (France) Philippe Monnet	Schlesser-Renault	4:42:39	5:10	3	(Germany) Jutta Kleinschmidt (Sweden) Tina Thörner	Mitsubishi	70:34:29	1:38:58
15	1	(France) Jean-Pierre Fontenay (France) Gilles Picard	Mitsubishi	1:07:06		1	(France) Jean-Louis Schlesser (France) Philippe Monnet	Schlesser-Renault	70:05:06	
15	2	(France) Stéphane Peterhansel (France) Jean-Paul Cottret	Nissan	1:08:22	1:16	2	(Spain) Miguel Prieto (France) Dominique Serieys	Mitsubishi	70:36:58	31:52
15	3	(France) Jean-Louis Schlesser (France) Philippe Monnet	Schlesser-Renault	1:09:35	2:29	3	(Germany) Jutta Kleinschmidt (Sweden) Tina Thörner	Mitsubishi	71:45:05	1:39:59
16	1	(Spain) Salvador Servia (Italy) Giorgio Albiero	Nissan	20:06		1	(France) Jean-Louis Schlesser (France) Philippe Monnet	Schlesser-Renault	70:26:35	
16	2	(France) Thierry Delavergne (France) Jacky Dubois	Nissan	20:22	0:16	2	(Spain) Miguel Prieto (France) Dominique Serieys	Mitsubishi	71:00:13	33:38
16	3	(Spain) José Maria Servia (France) Thierry Delli Zotti	Schlesser-Renault	21:20	1:14	3	(Germany) Jutta Kleinschmidt (Sweden) Tina Thörner	Mitsubishi	72:08:37	1:42:02

=== Trucks ===
	Stage result					General classification				
Stage	Pos	Competitor	Make	Time	Gap	Pos	Competitor	Make	Time	Gap
Prologue	Stage not held									
1	1	(Russia) Viktor Moskovskikh (Russia) Semen Yakubov (Russia) Vladimir Chagin	Kamaz	7:19		1	(Russia) Viktor Moskovskikh (Russia) Semen Yakubov (Russia) Vladimir Chagin	Kamaz	7:19	
1	2	(France) Edmond Pelichet (France) Clement Francis (France) André Godeloup	Mercedes-Benz	7:21	0:02	2	(France) Edmond Pelichet (France) Clement Francis (France) André Godeloup	Mercedes-Benz	7:21	0:02
1	3	(Brazil) André de Azevedo (Czech Republic) Tomáš Tomeček (Brazil) Leilane Neubarth	Tatra	7:27	0:08	3	(Brazil) André de Azevedo (Czech Republic) Tomáš Tomeček (Brazil) Leilane Neubarth	Tatra	7:27	0:08
2	1	(Brazil) André de Azevedo (Czech Republic) Tomáš Tomeček (Brazil) Leilane Neubarth	Tatra	1:39:14		1	(Brazil) André de Azevedo (Czech Republic) Tomáš Tomeček (Brazil) Leilane Neubarth	Tatra	1:46:41	
2	2	(Italy) Miki Biasion (Italy) Tiziano Siviero (Italy) Livio Diamante	Iveco	1:39:51	0:37	2	(Italy) Miki Biasion (Italy) Tiziano Siviero (Italy) Livio Diamante	Iveco	1:47:27	0:46
2	3	(Russia) Viktor Moskovskikh (Russia) Semen Yakubov (Russia) Vladimir Chagin	Kamaz	1:41:00	1:46	3	(Russia) Viktor Moskovskikh (Russia) Semen Yakubov (Russia) Vladimir Chagin	Kamaz	1:48:19	1:38
3	1	(Russia) Firdaus Kabirov (Russia) Aydar Belyaev (Russia) Vladimir Goloub	Kamaz	3:07:07		1	(Brazil) André de Azevedo (Czech Republic) Tomáš Tomeček (Brazil) Leilane Neubarth	Tatra	4:58:58	
3	2	(Czech Republic) Karel Loprais (Czech Republic) Radomír Stachura (Czech Republic) Josef Kalina	Tatra	3:07:54	0:47	2	(Russia) Firdaus Kabirov (Russia) Aydar Belyaev (Russia) Vladimir Goloub	Kamaz	5:01:39	2:41
3	3	(France) Edmond Pelichet (France) Clement Francis (France) André Godeloup	Mercedes-Benz	3:10:33	3:26	3	(Czech Republic) Karel Loprais (Czech Republic) Radomír Stachura (Czech Republic) Josef Kalina	Tatra	5:01:53	2:55
4	1	(Russia) Firdaus Kabirov (Russia) Aydar Belyaev (Russia) Vladimir Goloub	Kamaz	5:38:10		1	(Russia) Firdaus Kabirov (Russia) Aydar Belyaev (Russia) Vladimir Goloub	Kamaz	10:39:49	
4	2	(Czech Republic) Karel Loprais (Czech Republic) Radomír Stachura (Czech Republic) Josef Kalina	Tatra	5:39:55	1:25	2	(Czech Republic) Karel Loprais (Czech Republic) Radomír Stachura (Czech Republic) Josef Kalina	Tatra	10:41:28	1:39
4	3	(Russia) Viktor Moskovskikh (Russia) Semen Yakubov (Russia) Vladimir Chagin	Kamaz	5:48:42	10:32	3	(Russia) Viktor Moskovskikh (Russia) Semen Yakubov (Russia) Vladimir Chagin	Kamaz	10:59:43	19:54
5	1	(Japan) Yoshimasa Sugawara (Japan) Naoko Matsumoto (Japan) Teruhito Sugawara	Hino	8:31:45		1	(Czech Republic) Karel Loprais (Czech Republic) Radomír Stachura (Czech Republic) Josef Kalina	Tatra	19:14:13	
5	2	(Czech Republic) Karel Loprais (Czech Republic) Radomír Stachura (Czech Republic) Josef Kalina	Tatra	8:32:45	1:00	2	(Russia) Firdaus Kabirov (Russia) Aydar Belyaev (Russia) Vladimir Goloub	Kamaz	19:29:45	15:32
5	3	(Russia) Viktor Moskovskikh (Russia) Semen Yakubov (Russia) Vladimir Chagin	Kamaz	8:45:45	14:00	3	(Russia) Viktor Moskovskikh (Russia) Semen Yakubov (Russia) Vladimir Chagin	Kamaz	19:45:28	31:15
6	1	(Russia) Viktor Moskovskikh (Russia) Semen Yakubov (Russia) Vladimir Chagin	Kamaz	9:05:51		1	(Czech Republic) Karel Loprais (Czech Republic) Radomír Stachura (Czech Republic) Josef Kalina	Tatra	28:34:19	
6	2	(Russia) Firdaus Kabirov (Russia) Aydar Belyaev (Russia) Vladimir Goloub	Kamaz	9:10:43	4:52	2	(Russia) Firdaus Kabirov (Russia) Aydar Belyaev (Russia) Vladimir Goloub	Kamaz	28:40:28	6:09
6	3	(Brazil) André de Azevedo (Czech Republic) Tomáš Tomeček (Brazil) Leilane Neubarth	Tatra	9:11:06	5:15	3	(Russia) Viktor Moskovskikh (Russia) Semen Yakubov (Russia) Vladimir Chagin	Kamaz	28:51:19	17:00
7	1	(Russia) Firdaus Kabirov (Russia) Aydar Belyaev (Russia) Vladimir Goloub	Kamaz	7:52:06		1	(Russia) Firdaus Kabirov (Russia) Aydar Belyaev (Russia) Vladimir Goloub	Kamaz	36:32:34	
7	2	(Brazil) André de Azevedo (Czech Republic) Tomáš Tomeček (Brazil) Leilane Neubarth	Tatra	8:00:44	8:38	2	(Czech Republic) Karel Loprais (Czech Republic) Radomír Stachura (Czech Republic) Josef Kalina	Tatra	36:42:08	9:34
7	3	(Czech Republic) Karel Loprais (Czech Republic) Radomír Stachura (Czech Republic) Josef Kalina	Tatra	8:07:49	15:43	3	(Russia) Viktor Moskovskikh (Russia) Semen Yakubov (Russia) Vladimir Chagin	Kamaz	37:05:35	33:01
8	1	(Russia) Viktor Moskovskikh (Russia) Semen Yakubov (Russia) Vladimir Chagin	Kamaz	6:09:52		1	(Czech Republic) Karel Loprais (Czech Republic) Radomír Stachura (Czech Republic) Josef Kalina	Tatra	43:02:39	
8	2	(Czech Republic) Karel Loprais (Czech Republic) Radomír Stachura (Czech Republic) Josef Kalina	Tatra	6:20:31	10:39	2	(Russia) Viktor Moskovskikh (Russia) Semen Yakubov (Russia) Vladimir Chagin	Kamaz	43:15:27	12:48
8	3	(Italy) Miki Biasion (Italy) Tiziano Siviero (Italy) Livio Diamante	Iveco	6:39:51	29:59	3	(Brazil) André de Azevedo (Czech Republic) Tomáš Tomeček (Brazil) Leilane Neubarth	Tatra	44:16:14	1:13:35
9	1	(Brazil) André de Azevedo (Czech Republic) Tomáš Tomeček (Brazil) Leilane Neubarth	Tatra	4:35:06		1	(Czech Republic) Karel Loprais (Czech Republic) Radomír Stachura (Czech Republic) Josef Kalina	Tatra	47:47:07	
9	2	(Czech Republic) Karel Loprais (Czech Republic) Radomír Stachura (Czech Republic) Josef Kalina	Tatra	4:44:28	9:22	2	(Russia) Viktor Moskovskikh (Russia) Semen Yakubov (Russia) Vladimir Chagin	Kamaz	48:01:45	14:38
9	3	(Russia) Viktor Moskovskikh (Russia) Semen Yakubov (Russia) Vladimir Chagin	Kamaz	4:46:18	11:12	3	(Brazil) André de Azevedo (Czech Republic) Tomáš Tomeček (Brazil) Leilane Neubarth	Tatra	48:51:20	1:04:13
10	1	(Russia) Firdaus Kabirov (Russia) Aydar Belyaev (Russia) Vladimir Goloub	Kamaz	5:34:47		1	(Russia) Viktor Moskovskikh (Russia) Semen Yakubov (Russia) Vladimir Chagin	Kamaz	54:15:28	
10	2	(Italy) Miki Biasion (Italy) Tiziano Siviero (Italy) Livio Diamante	Iveco	5:52:22	17:35	2	(Czech Republic) Karel Loprais (Czech Republic) Radomír Stachura (Czech Republic) Josef Kalina	Tatra	54:29:39	14:11
10	3	(Russia) Viktor Moskovskikh (Russia) Semen Yakubov (Russia) Vladimir Chagin	Kamaz	6:13:43	38:56	3	(Brazil) André de Azevedo (Czech Republic) Tomáš Tomeček (Brazil) Leilane Neubarth	Tatra	55:14:20	58:52
11	1	(Russia) Viktor Moskovskikh (Russia) Semen Yakubov (Russia) Vladimir Chagin	Kamaz	7:30:20		1	(Russia) Viktor Moskovskikh (Russia) Semen Yakubov (Russia) Vladimir Chagin	Kamaz	61:45:48	
11	2	(Czech Republic) Karel Loprais (Czech Republic) Radomír Stachura (Czech Republic) Josef Kalina	Tatra	7:52:15	21:55	2	(Czech Republic) Karel Loprais (Czech Republic) Radomír Stachura (Czech Republic) Josef Kalina	Tatra	62:21:54	36:06
11	3	(Japan) Yoshimasa Sugawara (Japan) Naoko Matsumoto (Japan) Teruhito Sugawara	Hino	7:53:26	23:06	3	(Brazil) André de Azevedo (Czech Republic) Tomáš Tomeček (Brazil) Leilane Neubarth	Tatra	64:06:56	2:21:08
12	1	(Japan) Yoshimasa Sugawara (Japan) Naoko Matsumoto (Japan) Teruhito Sugawara	Hino	9:07:32		1	(Russia) Viktor Moskovskikh (Russia) Semen Yakubov (Russia) Vladimir Chagin	Kamaz	70:54:29	
12	2	(Russia) Viktor Moskovskikh (Russia) Semen Yakubov (Russia) Vladimir Chagin	Kamaz	9:08:41	1:09	2	(Czech Republic) Karel Loprais (Czech Republic) Radomír Stachura (Czech Republic) Josef Kalina	Tatra	71:37:53	43:24
12	3	(Czech Republic) Karel Loprais (Czech Republic) Radomír Stachura (Czech Republic) Josef Kalina	Tatra	9:15:59	8:27	3	(Brazil) André de Azevedo (Czech Republic) Tomáš Tomeček (Brazil) Leilane Neubarth	Tatra	73:48:05	2:53:36
13	1	(Czech Republic) Karel Loprais (Czech Republic) Radomír Stachura (Czech Republic) Josef Kalina	Tatra	10:36:54		1	(Czech Republic) Karel Loprais (Czech Republic) Radomír Stachura (Czech Republic) Josef Kalina	Tatra	82:14:47	
13	2	(Japan) Yoshimasa Sugawara (Japan) Naoko Matsumoto (Japan) Teruhito Sugawara	Hino	10:38:35	1:41	2	(Russia) Viktor Moskovskikh (Russia) Semen Yakubov (Russia) Vladimir Chagin	Kamaz	83:19:29	1:04:42
13	3	(Brazil) André de Azevedo (Czech Republic) Tomáš Tomeček (Brazil) Leilane Neubarth	Tatra	10:58:18	21:24	3	(Brazil) André de Azevedo (Czech Republic) Tomáš Tomeček (Brazil) Leilane Neubarth	Tatra	84:46:23	2:31:36
14	1	(Russia) Viktor Moskovskikh (Russia) Semen Yakubov (Russia) Vladimir Chagin	Kamaz	5:37:06		1	(Czech Republic) Karel Loprais (Czech Republic) Radomír Stachura (Czech Republic) Josef Kalina	Tatra	87:56:24	
14	2	(Czech Republic) Karel Loprais (Czech Republic) Radomír Stachura (Czech Republic) Josef Kalina	Tatra	5:41:37	4:31	2	(Russia) Viktor Moskovskikh (Russia) Semen Yakubov (Russia) Vladimir Chagin	Kamaz	88:56:35	1:00:11
14	3	(Brazil) André de Azevedo (Czech Republic) Tomáš Tomeček (Brazil) Leilane Neubarth	Tatra	5:50:50	13:44	3	(Brazil) André de Azevedo (Czech Republic) Tomáš Tomeček (Brazil) Leilane Neubarth	Tatra	90:37:13	2:40:49
15	1	(Russia) Firdaus Kabirov (Russia) Aydar Belyaev (Russia) Vladimir Goloub	Kamaz	1:12:41		1	(Czech Republic) Karel Loprais (Czech Republic) Radomír Stachura (Czech Republic) Josef Kalina	Tatra	89:27:30	
15	2	(Russia) Viktor Moskovskikh (Russia) Semen Yakubov (Russia) Vladimir Chagin	Kamaz	1:14:45	2:04	2	(Russia) Viktor Moskovskikh (Russia) Semen Yakubov (Russia) Vladimir Chagin	Kamaz	90:11:20	43:50
15	3	(Brazil) André de Azevedo (Czech Republic) Tomáš Tomeček (Brazil) Leilane Neubarth	Tatra	1:20:05	7:24	3	(Brazil) André de Azevedo (Czech Republic) Tomáš Tomeček (Brazil) Leilane Neubarth	Tatra	91:57:18	2:29:48
16	1	(Russia) Viktor Moskovskikh (Russia) Semen Yakubov (Russia) Vladimir Chagin	Kamaz	29:54		1	(Czech Republic) Karel Loprais (Czech Republic) Radomír Stachura (Czech Republic) Josef Kalina	Tatra	90:01:26	
16	1	(Russia) Firdaus Kabirov (Russia) Aydar Belyaev (Russia) Vladimir Goloub	Kamaz	29:54		2	(Russia) Viktor Moskovskikh (Russia) Semen Yakubov (Russia) Vladimir Chagin	Kamaz	90:41:14	39:48
16	3	(Japan) Yoshimasa Sugawara (Japan) Naoko Matsumoto (Japan) Teruhito Sugawara	Hino	30:43	0:49	3	(Brazil) André de Azevedo (Czech Republic) Tomáš Tomeček (Brazil) Leilane Neubarth	Tatra	92:28:31	2:27:05

== Final standings ==
=== Motorcycles ===
Pos	No.	Rider	Bike	Entrant	Time
1	12	(France) Richard Sainct	BMW	BMW Motorrad	58:44:59
2	8	(France) Thierry Magnaldi	KTM	KTM Austria	+4:09
3	2	(South Africa) Alfie Cox	KTM	KTM Austria	+41:19
4	3	(Spain) Jordi Arcarons	KTM	KTM Austria	+1:24:42
5	19	(Spain) Carlos Sotelo	Yamaha	Antena 3 Television	+3:21:18
6	5	(United Kingdom) John Deacon	KTM		+4:00:48
7	23	(Italy) Giovanni Sala	KTM	KTM Austria	+4:45:29
8	7	(Chile) Carlo de Gavardo	KTM	KTM YPF Entel Chile	+5:16:50
9	14	(Spain) Oscar Gallardo	BMW	BMW Motorrad	+6:30:36
10	1	(Italy) Meoni Fabrizio	KTM	Lleida Dakar	+6:49:39
11	25	(Spain) Isidre Esteve	KTM	Lieida Dakar	+8:28:03
12	139	(Netherlands) Wim Hutten	KTM	Hutten Metaal	+8:29:47
13	35	(Italy) Maletti Guido	Kavasaki	Kavasaki Italia	+9:17:01
14	29	(Netherlands) Verhoef Eric	Ktm	Beined Ktm	+9:34:37
15	131	(Japan) Hakata Iwao	Honda	Brittany Motors	+10:15:22

=== Cars ===
Pos	No.	Driver	Co-Driver	Car	Entrant	Time
1	200	(France) Jean-Louis Schlesser	(France) Philippe Monnet	Buggy Schlesser-Renault	Schlesser-Renault-Elf	70:26:35
2	207	(Spain) Miguel Prieto	(France) Dominique Serieys	Mitsubishi		+33:38
3	208	(Germany) Jutta Kleinschmidt	(Sweden) Tina Thörner	Mitsubishi	Mitsubishi Germany	+1:42:02
4	202	(Japan) Kenjiro Shinozuka	(Andorra) Henri Magne	Mitsubishi	Sonauto Mitsubishi	+2:25:34
5	206	(Spain) José Maria Servia	(France) Thierry Delli Zotti	Schlesser-Renault	Schlesser-Renault-Elf	+3:39:28
6	203	(Japan) Hiroshi Masuoka	(Germany) Andreas Schulz	Mitsubishi	Mitsubishi International	+5:16:28
7	217	(France) Stéphane Peterhansel	(France) Jean-Paul Cottret	Nissan	Team Dessoude	+6:11:21
8	204	(France) Thierry Delavergne	(France) Jacky Dubois	Nissan	Team Dessoude	+6:26:22
9	201	(France) Jean-Pierre Fontenay	(France) Gilles Picard	Mitsubishi	Sonauto Mitsubishi	+8:32:39
10	205	(Spain) Salvador Servia	(Italy) Giorgio Albiero	Nissan	Nissan Tecnosport	+12:15:40
11	218	(France) Henri Pescarolo	(France) Alain Guéhennec	Nissan	Nissan Dessoude	+12:24:04
12	215	(France) Grégoire De Mévius	(Belgium) Serge De Liedekerke	Nissan	Nissan Dessoude	+12:38:02
13	221	(Belgium) Bernard Hanciaux	(France) Philippe Rey	Nissan	Nissan Tecnosport	+12:51:20
14	251	(Italy) Gianni Lora Lamia	(Italy) Roberto di Persio	Nissan	Nissan Dessoude	+16:53:01
15	222	(Belgium) Gerard Marcy	(Belgium) Jean Marie Lurquin	Nissan	Nissan Dessoude	+17:06:35

=== Trucks ===
Pos	No.	Driver	Co-Drivers	Truck	Time
1	407	(Czech Republic) Karel Loprais	(Czech Republic) Radomír Stachura (Czech Republic) Josef Kalina	Tatra 815	90:01:26
2	409	(Russia) Viktor Moskovskikh	(Russia) Vladimir Chagin (Russia) Semen Yakubov	Kamaz	+39:48
3	425	(Brazil) André de Azevedo	(Czech Republic) Tomas Tomecek (Brazil) Leilane Neubarth	Tatra	+2:27:05
4	400	(Japan) Yoshimasa Sugawara	(Japan) Naoko Matsumoto (Japan) Teruhito Sugawara	Hino	+3:51:38
5	401	(Italy) Miki Biasion	(Italy) Tiziano Siviero (Italy) Livio Diamante	Iveco	+7:11:50
6	410	(France) Christian Barbier	(France) Pierre Barbier (France) Ahmed Benbekhti	Mitsubishi	+9:28:58
7	414	(Russia) Firdaus Kabirov	(Russia) Aydar Belyaev (Russia) Vladimir Goloub	Kamaz	+9:55:51
8	432	(Austria) Peter Reif	(Austria) Johann Deinhofer (Germany) Holger Hermann Roth	MAN	+14:47:27
9	408	(France) Jean Paul Bosonnet	(France) Granjon Christophe (France) Jean Louis Berger	Mercedes-Benz	+14:51:43
10	423	(France) Raphael Gimbre	(France) François Marcheix (France) Ai Nhat Bui	Mercedes-Benz	+16:36:43
11	423	(France) Edmond Pelichet	(France) Francis Clement (France) André Godeloup	Mercedes-Benz	+18:16:32
12	406	(Italy) Corrado Pattono	(Italy) Alessandro Pio	Mercedes-Benz	+25:20:11
13	435	(Spain) Jordy Juvanteny	(Spain) Francesco Pardo (Spain) Jose Luis Criado	Mercedes-Benz	+30:18:04
14	419	(France) Yves Ferry	(France) Pierre Reiff (France) Bernd Korber	Mercedes-Benz	+30:53:47
15	417	(France) Gérard Boin	(France) Raymond Louin (France) Michel Gambillon	Mercedes-Benz	+49:53:34
