= Enrico Adanti =

Italian racing driver

Enrico Adanti is a former Italian racing driver. He entered 22 races between 1938 and 1940, and between 1946 and 1953, mainly driving a Fiat or Lancia. He started the Mille Miglia 9 times.

== Complete results ==
| Year | Date | Race | Car | Teammate(s) | Result |
|---|---|---|---|---|---|
| 1938 | April 3 | Mille Miglia | Fiat | "U. Stefanelli" | 57th |
| 1938 | August 15 | Targa Abruzzo | Fiat 1100 | "U. Stefanelli" | 12th |
| 1939 | March 26 | Litoranea Libica | Fiat | | |
| 1939 | June 11 | Circuito dell'Impero | Fiat 1100 | | |
| 1940 | April 28 | Mille Miglia | Fiat 1100 | "Baccarini" | 29th |
| 1946 | September 3 | 1946 Gran Premio del Valentino | Lancia Aprilia | | DNF |
| 1946 | October 6 | Circuito di Mantova (S1.5) | Lancia Aprilia | | 3rd |
| 1946 | October 6 | Circuito di Mantova (Handicap) | | | DNF |
| 1946 | October 13 | Voghera | Lancia Aprilia | | 6th |
| 1947 | May 11 | Circuito di Piacenza | Lancia Aprilia | | 6th |
| 1947 | June 22 | Mille Miglia | Lancia Aprilia | "Spadoni" | DNF |
| 1947 | July 6 | Forlì | Lancia Aprilia | | 2nd |
| 1947 | August 15 | Circuito di Pescara | | | DNF |
| 1948 | May 2 | Mille Miglia | Lancia Aprilia | Silvio Rondina | DNA |
| 1948 | May 2 | Mille Miglia | Lancia Aprilia | "Spadoni" | DNF |
| 1949 | April 24 | Mille Miglia | Stanguellini S1100 | Vittorugo Mallucci | 8th |
| 1949 | August 21 | Circuito de Senigallia | Stanguellini S1100 | | DNF |
| 1950 | April 23 | Mille Miglia | Stanguellini S1100 | Vittorugo Mallucci | 15th |
| 1950 | August 20 | Circuito de Senigallia | Stanguellini S1100 | | DNF |
| 1951 | April 29 | Mille Miglia | Fiat Ermini Sighinolfi | "R. Rubbiani" | 42nd |
| 1953 | April 26 | Mille Miglia (part of FIA World Sportscar Championship) | Lancia Ardea | Alessandro Vici | DNF |
| 1953 | June 28 | Giro dell'Umbria | Lancia Ardea | Alessandro Vici | 49th |

== Bibliography ==
- Racing Sports Cars
- Ultimate Racing History
- Pre-War Sports Car Races
