= Gianni Lora Lamia =

Italian rally driver (born 1965)

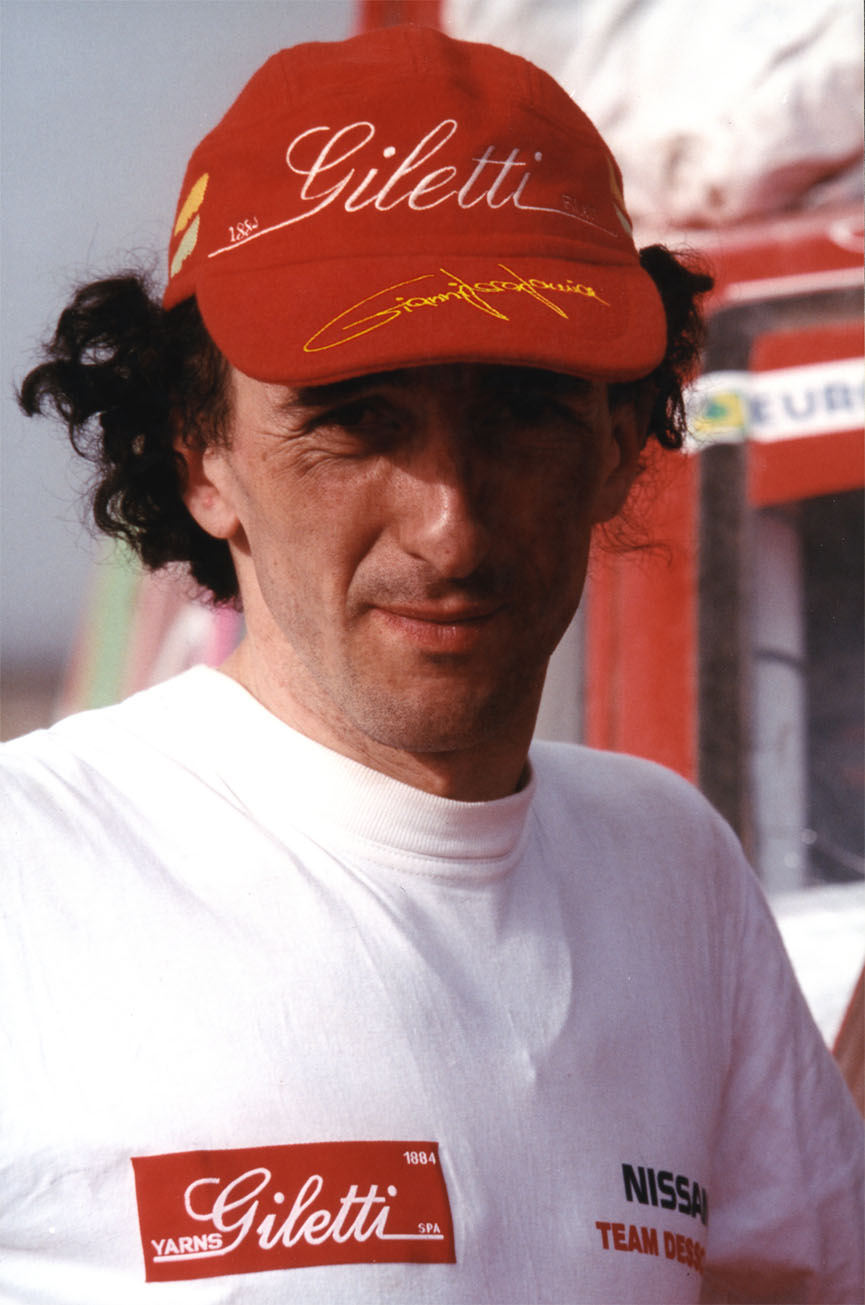
- Gianni Lora Lamia at the Granada-Dakar 1999
- Born: January 16, 1965 (age 61); Trivero, Italy
- Years active: Paris-Tripoli-Dakar 1990 – 2004 Dakar Rally
- Honours: "Dakar Legends Priority Driver"
- Categorisation: (Italy) FIA International C Licence IT 29343
Dakar Rally career
- Years active: 1990 Paris-Tripoli-Dakar; 1991 Paris-Tripoli-Dakar; 1992 Paris-Sirte-Cape Town; 1993 Paris-Dakar; 1995 Granada-Dakar; 1996 Granada-Dakar; 1998 Paris-Granada-Dakar; 1999 Granada-Dakar; 2000 Paris-Dakar-Cairo; 2001 Paris-Dakar; 2002 Arras-Madrid-Dakar; 2003 Marseille-Valencia-Sharm El Sheik; 2004 Clermont Ferrand-Dakar
- Teams: (Italy) Astra Trucks; Nissan France; (Japan) Nissan; (Japan) Mitsubishi Motors
- Co-driver: (Italy) Giovanni Cassini; (Italy) Roberto di Persio; (Italy) Luciano Carcheri
- Starts: 14
- Best finish: 14th Overall in the Granada-Dakar 1999
- Website: https://www.gianniloralamia.com

Signature
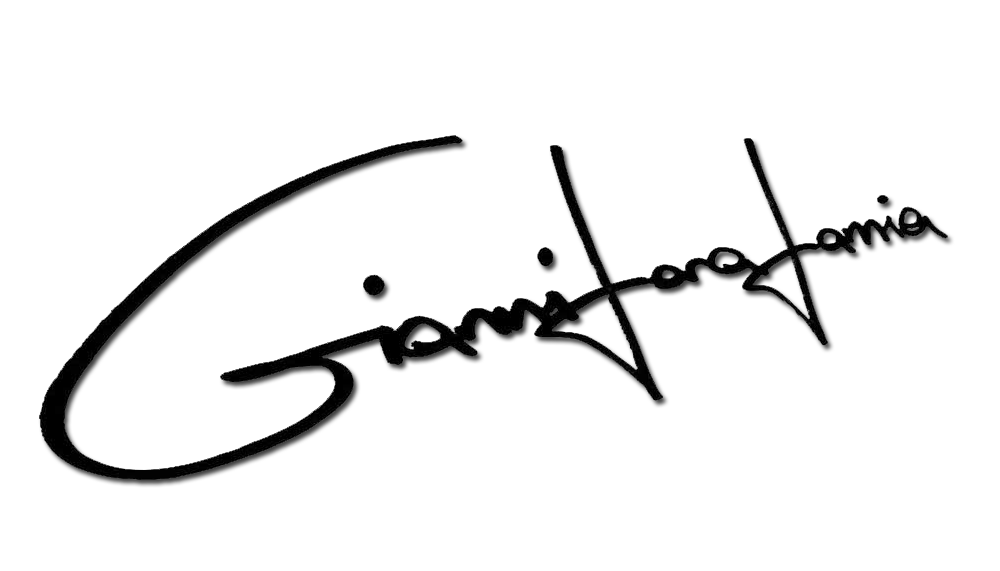

Gianni Lora Lamia (born 16 January 1965) is an Italian rally and rally raid driver who competed in the Dakar Rally, the FIA World Cup for Cross-Country Rallies and other events.

== Biography ==
He was born in Trivero, Italy, a small town in the province of Biella in Piedmont; his family had existing links to the world of motorsport. He participated in the Dakar Rally from 1989 to 2004, as well as other rally raids including the Pharaons Rally in Egypt, the Rally of Tunisia, Atlas Rally Maroc and the Abu Dhabi Desert Challenge, and the former UAE Desert Challenge.

For his participation from 1998 to 2002 in the Dakar Rally, he was officially supported and sponsored by the former Formula 1 driver Emilio Giletti.

With his best result,14th overall, at the 1999 Granada Dakar, he became the Italian driver to achieve the highest placing in the rally's general classification. He is on the Dakar Legend Priority list of drivers who have participated more than 10 times in the race.

== Racing career ==
His debut in Africa was at the 12th edition of the 1990 Paris-Tripoli-Dakar with an Astra BM309 6x6 truck from Astra Veicoli Industriali.

From the following edition, the 13th Paris-Tripoli-Dakar 1991, he switched to the car category, with a Nissan Terrano WD21 3.0 L V6 T1 and with the French French: Team Dessoude , with whom he participated in the Dakar rally for 8 editions of the race from 1991 to 2000 and with whom he also obtained his best results ever, 3rd place at the 1992 Paris–Cape Town Rally in the T1 Marathon 4x4 petrol category, completing the podium for the Japanese brand Nissan with 3 cars in the top 3 places upon arrival in Cape Town, South Africa and 14th overall place at the 1999 Granada–Dakar Rally with a Nissan Patrol GR Y60 4.2 L T3.

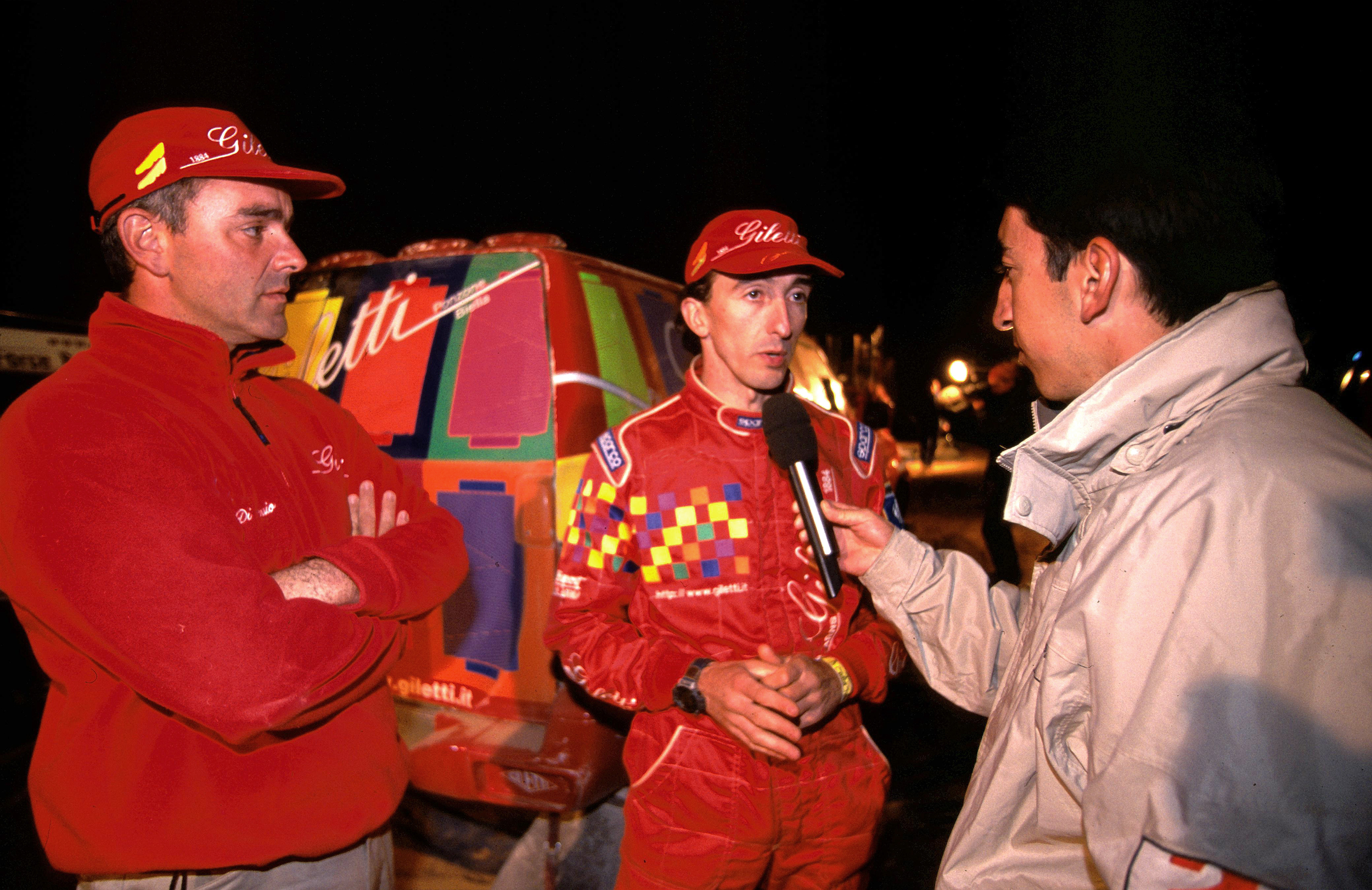
Gianni Lora Lamia at the 2000 Paris–Dakar–Cairo Rally

At the 2000 Paris–Dakar–Cairo Rally, he was entered in the race by Nissan Motorsport and the French French: Team Dessoude , with a new Nissan Patrol GR Y61 4.5 L T3 with a body made entirely of carbon fiber, after only 4 stages, he was already in 16th place overall in the general classification, fighting for the top ten when an electrical problem stopped him in the stage that led to Niamey, the capital of Niger. After a difficult and complicated comeback he managed to finish the race in Cairo in Egypt still in 29th place overall and first of the Italian drivers at the final finish line.

In 2000 he also took part in the Rally of Tunisia which he finished in 23th place overall, in a race marked for him by numerous mechanical problems that made him lose several hours in the standings.

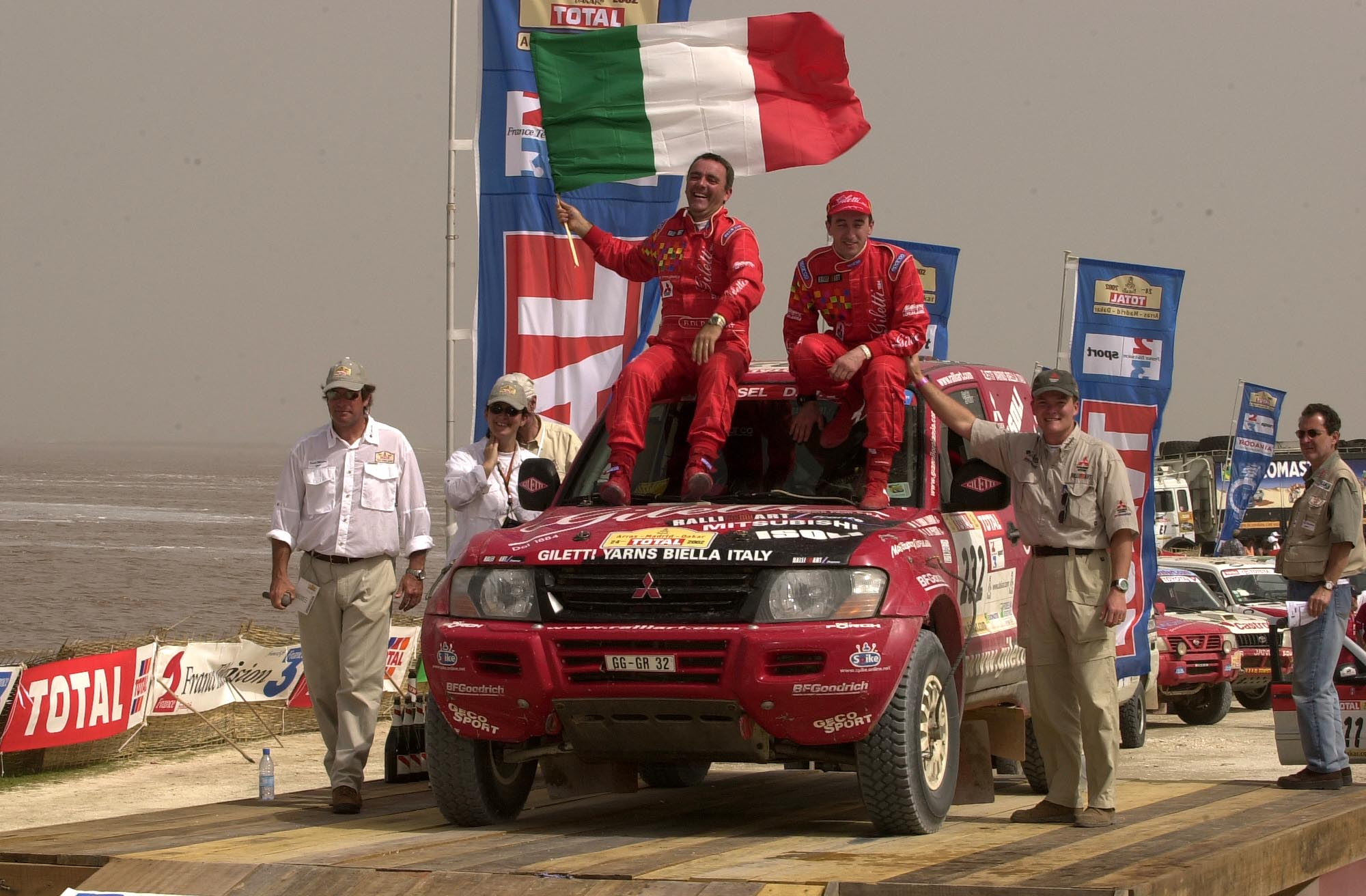
Gianni Lora Lamia at the 2002 Arras–Madrid–Dakar Rally

For the 24th edition of the Arras-Madrid-Dakar 2002, he moved to the Mitsubishi Ralliart team with a Mitsubishi Pajero V60 MPR9 Superproduction T2 Diesel D-ID and finished in 16th place overall, with a 4th place overall in the fourth stage Madrid-Rabat, after having fought throughout the race with the Frenchman Luc Alphand, his teammate, and then winner of the Dakar rally in the following years. He was one of the drivers who made possible the absolute domination of the Mitsubishi Ralliart team, which concluded the 24th edition of the Dakar, one of the most difficult in history, by placing 11 Pajero cars in the first 20 places in the general classification.

In 2003 he switched again to Nissan, and took part in the Dakar Rally 2003, halfway through the race he was fighting for the top ten, but he reached the end of stage 11, from Sarir in Libya to Siwa in Egypt, the stage preceding the rest day, with the engine of his Nissan Patrol GR Y61 T3, seriously damaged, the race regulations did not allow the replacement of the engine and he was thus forced to retire.

The year 2004 marked his final and definitive participation in the Dakar Rally.

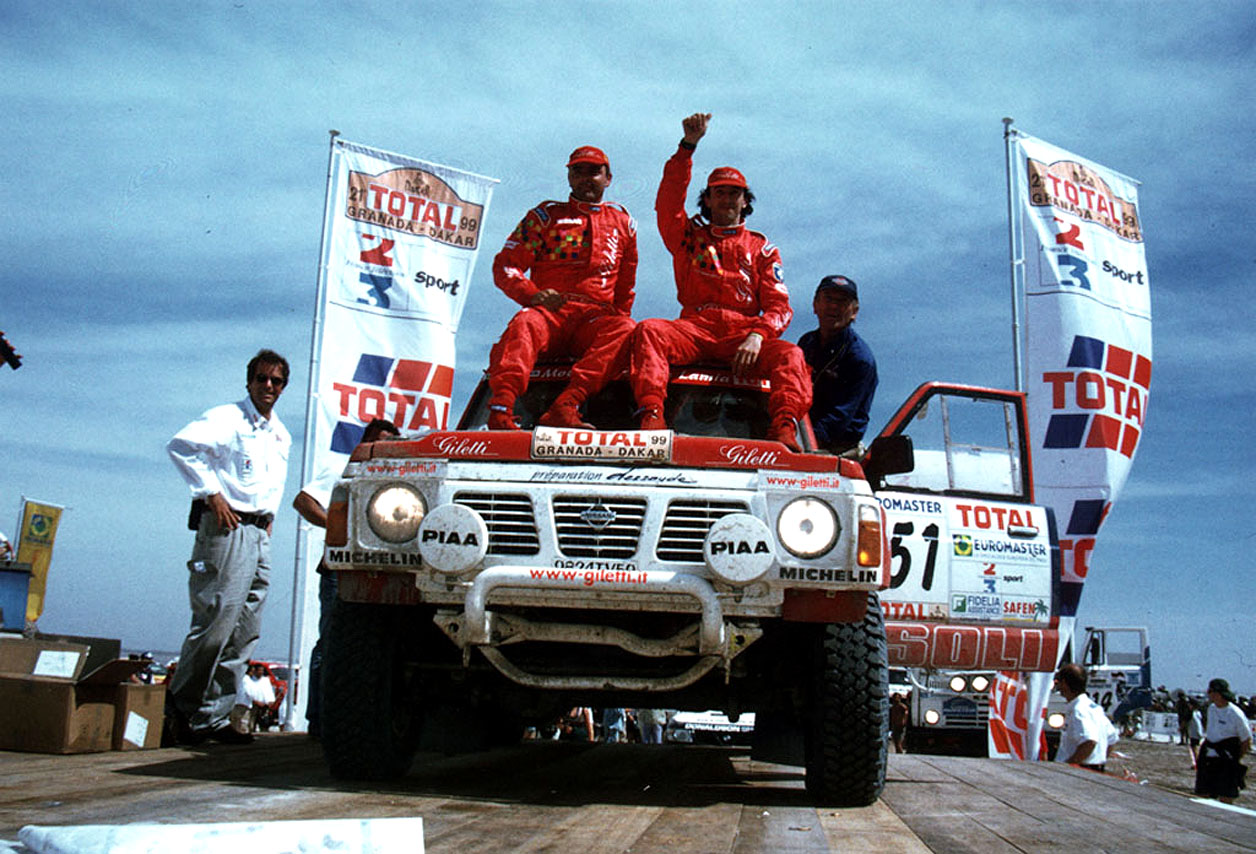
Gianni Lora Lamia at the 1999 Granada–Dakar Rally

== Best Dakar Rally Overall Results ==
- 1992 Paris–Sirte-Cape Town 3rd Overall T1 Marathon 4x4 Class
- 1999 Granada-Dakar 14th Overall and 2nd T3 Prototype 4x4 Petrol Engines Class
- 2002 Arras Madrid-Dakar 16th Overall and 4th Superproduction 4x4 Diesel

== Collaboration with official teams ==
From 2004 to 2007 he also collaborated with several teams, such as Mitsubishi Ralliart and Volkswagen Motorsport for the development of new generation cars for the Dakar Rally.

== Television ==
From 2004 to 2015, he collaborated as a technical consultant for the live race commentary of the Dakar Rally and Rally Raid for the Sports TV network (Eurosport Italy).
