= Vittorugo Mallucci =

Italian racing driver

Vittorugo Mallucci is a former Italian racing driver. He drove 13 races between 1934 and 1954, mainly in Fiats and Ferraris, his best results being two second places and one third place. After his retirement he founded Industrial Cooling Vittorugo Mallucci, a company that produced frozen food and canned food. It was declared bankrupt in March 2012, after being incorporated into and sold to various other companies over the years, because the dependence on the group Nestle had become unsustainable.

== Complete racing results ==
| Year | Date | Race | Entrant | Car | Teammate(s) | Result |
|---|---|---|---|---|---|---|
| 1934 | 8 April | Mille Miglia | - | Fiat Siata 508S | "O. Astolfi" | 19th |
| 1937 | 4 April | Mille Miglia | - | Alfa Romeo 8C 2300 | Giuseppe Tuffanelli | DNF |
| 1949 | 24 April | Mille Miglia | - | Stanguellini S1100 | Enrico Adanti | 8th |
| 1949 | 26 May | Ferrara | Vittorugo Mallucci | Stanguellini S1100 | none | 2nd |
| 1949 | 15 August | Circuito di Pescara | Vittorugo Mallucci | Stanguellini S1100 | none | 9th |
| 1949 | 21 August | Circuito di Senigallia | Vittorugo Mallucci | Stanguellini S1100 | none | 6th |
| 1949 | 25 September | Giro delle Calabria | Vittorugo Mallucci | Stanguellini S1100 | none | 3rd |
| 1950 | 23 April | Mille Miglia | Vittorugo Mallucci | Stanguellini S1100 | Enrico Adanti | 15th |
| 1950 | 20 August | Circuito di Senigallia | - | Ferrari 166 MM | - | 2nd |
| 1951 | 12 August | Circuito di Senigallia | - | Ferrari 166 MM | - | - |
| 1952 | 4 May | Mille Miglia | Vittorugo Mallucci | Osca MT4 | Noé Cecchetti | DNF |
| 1952 | 16 August | 12 Hours of Pescara | - | Ferrari 225 S | Luigi Piotti | 3rd |
| 1954 | 8 August | Circuito di Senigallia | - | Ferrari | - | 6th |
