= Walter Loro Piana =

Italian racing driver

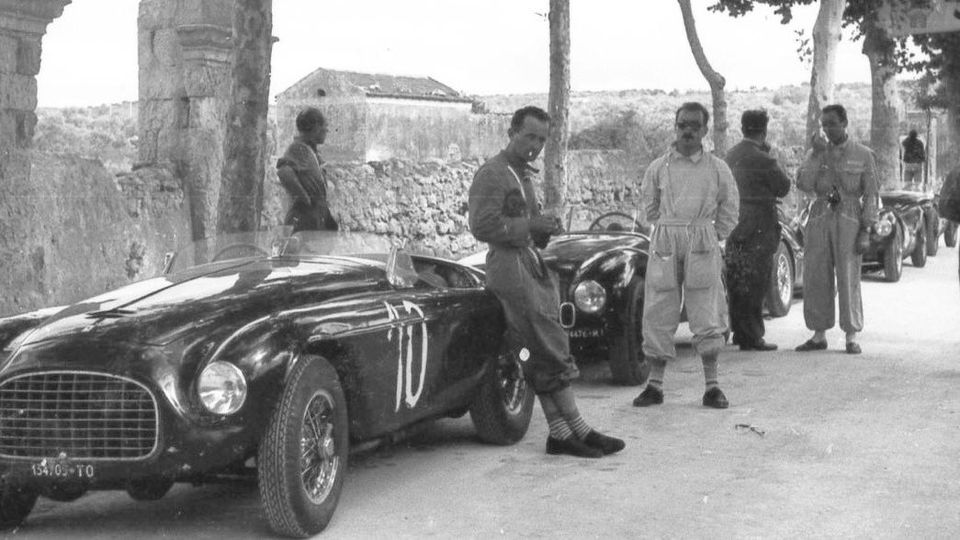

Walter Loro Piana is a former Italian racing driver.

== Complete results ==
Year	Date	Race	Entrant	Car	Teammate(s)	Result
1952	May 4	Mille Miglia	Emilio Giletti	Ferrari 166 MM	Emilio Giletti	DNF
1952	June 1	Coppa della Toscana		Ferrari 166 MM	Emilio Giletti	11th
1952	September 14	Trofeo Sardo		Ferrari 166 MM	Emilio Giletti	1st
