= Guerino Bertocchi =

Italian racing driver and mechanic (1907–1981)

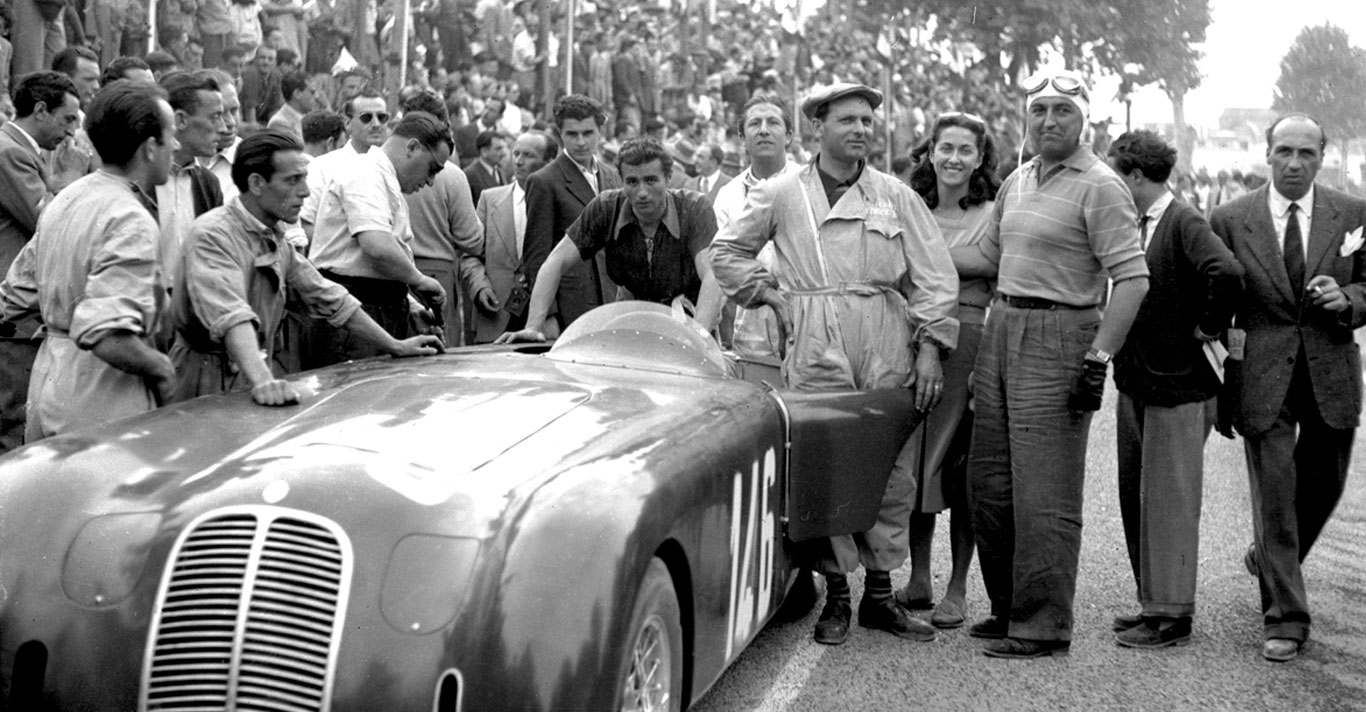
- Bertocchi (center) in Piacenza with the Maserati A6 CS and driver Mario Angiolini, 11 May 1947
- Born: Guarino Bertocchi; October 29, 1907; Budrio, Italy
- Died: April 13, 1981 (aged 73); Modena, Italy
- Other names: Guerrino
- Occupations: Mechanic and racing driver
- Years active: 1926–1963
- Known for: Association with Maserati

Guerino Bertocchi (October 29, 1907 – April 13, 1981) was an Italian mechanic and racing driver known for his lifelong association with Maserati.

Bertocchi was born on October 29, 1907, in Budrio. His younger brother, Gino, was also a mechanic. Initially employed at the Maserati factory, Bertocchi debuted as a mechanic and co-driver alongside Alfieri Maserati in the 1926 Targa Florio. In 1947, he was promoted to the role of chief mechanic and test driver of the Maserati Formula One team, as well as testing road cars like the 5000 GT. In 1957, he ran the car that gave Juan Manuel Fangio his third and fifth world titles. Fangio came to depending on Bertocchi to test the car, to the extent of declaring that he wouldn't drive a car if Bertocchi did not test it before.

Bertocchi's only Formula One entry as a driver is the 1954 Spanish Grand Prix as a reserve driver. However, all Maserati-drivers started the race and Bertocchi never entered a Formula One race again.

Between 1931 and 1963, he competed thirteen times in the Mille Miglia, once in the Targa Florio, once in the 12 Hours of Pescara and once in the 24 Hours of Le Mans. Although officially employed as a running mechanic, Bertocchi would often share driving duties. Bertocchi's best result was in 1953, when together with Emilio Giletti they finished sixth.

Bertocchi worked for Maserati until 1971, when the company was bought by Citroën. He then moved to De Tomaso Automobili, where he led the company client's car testing department.

== Complete results ==
Year	Date	Race	Entrant	Car	Teammate	Result
1931	April 12	Mille Miglia	Giuseppe Tuffanelli	Maserati 26C 1100	Giuseppe Tuffanelli	22nd
1932	April 10	Mille Miglia		Maserati 4CTR 1100	Giuseppe Tuffanelli	20th
1933	April 9	Mille Miglia		Maserati 4CS 1100	Giuseppe Tuffanelli	DNF
1934	April 8	Mille Miglia		Maserati 4CS 1100	Piero Taruffi	5th
1935	April 14	Mille Miglia		Maserati 4CS 1100	Ettore Bianco	7th
1936	April 5	Mille Miglia		Maserati 4CS 1500	Omobono Tenni	5th
1947	June 22	Mille Miglia		Maserati A6GCS	Luigi Villoresi	DNF
1948	April 4	Targa Florio	Scuderia Ambrosiana	Maserati A6GCS	Luigi Villoresi	DNF
1948	May 2	Mille Miglia	Scuderia Ambrosiana	Maserati A6GCS	Alberto Ascari	DNF
1953	April 26	Mille Miglia		Maserati A6GCS	Emilio Giletti	6th
1953	August 15	12 Hours of Pescara	Officine Alfieri Maserati	Maserati A6GCS	Luigi Musso	
1954	May 2	Mille Miglia		Maserati A6GCS	none	DNF
1955	May 1	Mille Miglia		Maserati	none	DNF
1956	April 29	Mille Miglia	Officine Alfieri Maserati	Maserati 150S	Jean Behra	20th
1957	May 12	Mille Miglia	Officine Alfieri Maserati	Maserati 300S	Giorgio Scarlatti	4th
1963	June 16	24 Hours of Le Mans	Johnny Simon	Maserati Tipo 151	André Simon; Lloyd Casner	DNF
