= Schlesser =

Schlesser is a surname. Notable people with the surname include:

- Félicie Erpelding-Schlesser (1883–1970), Luxembourgish municipal politician
- Émile V. Schlesser (born 1986), Luxembourgish film director, screenwriter, composer, and multimedia artist
- Jean-Louis Schlesser (born 1947), French racing driver
- Jo Schlesser (1928–1968), French racing driver
