= Emilio Giletti =

Italian racing driver (1929–2020)

- Nationality: (Italy) Italian
- Born: 20 April 1929; Trivero, Kingdom of Italy
- Died: 4 January 2020 (aged 90); Novara, Italy

Emilio Giletti (20 April 1929 – 4 January 2020) was an Italian racing driver. He made a name for himself in the early 1950s, after the racing experience took possession of the family factory, and was later the owner of Giletti S.p.A. His son Massimo Giletti is an Italian television host.

== Racing career ==
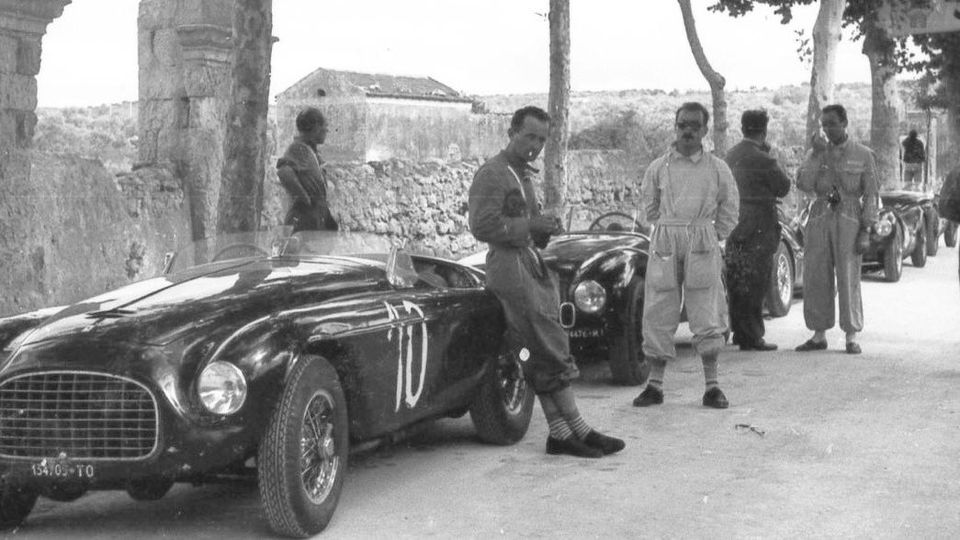
Emilio Giletti towards win in his Ferrari 166 at 1952 Trofeo Sardo on 14 September 1952.

Emilio Giletti only entered 25 races between 1951 and 1955, racing mainly Ferraris and Maseratis. In 1953, his big break came when Maserati decided to offer three young drivers the chance to drive their sportscars; Emilio was chosen along with Luigi Musso and Sergio Mantovani. It was with the Officine Alfieri Maserati squad, when he scored his biggest win, when he took a class victory on the 1953 Mille Miglia.

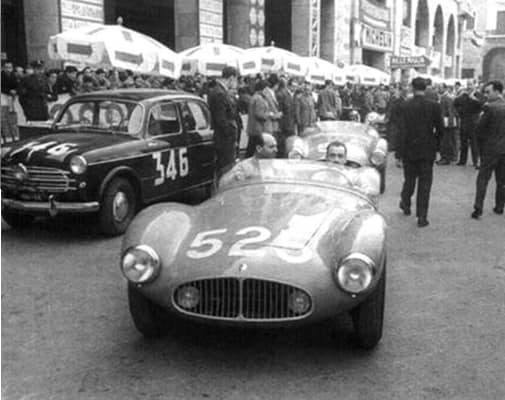
Maserati A6GCS at 1953 Mille Miglia, driven by Emilio Giletti and Guerino Bertocchi to a 6th place

During this period, he enjoyed some success, scoring his only race win, in the 1952 non-championship Trofeo della Reggione Sardo and finished on the podium in the 1953 Targa Florio. Away from Sportscars, Giletti raced in just one Formula One race, the 1953 Gran Premio di Modena, but retired due to a valve failure with his Maserati A6GCM. He was also originally listed to race in the 1954 Gran Premio de la Republica Argentina, but Maserati gave the drive to Musso instead.

After finishing seventh in the 1955 Giro di Sicilia, he retired from International Motor Sport.

== Giletti S.p.A. ==
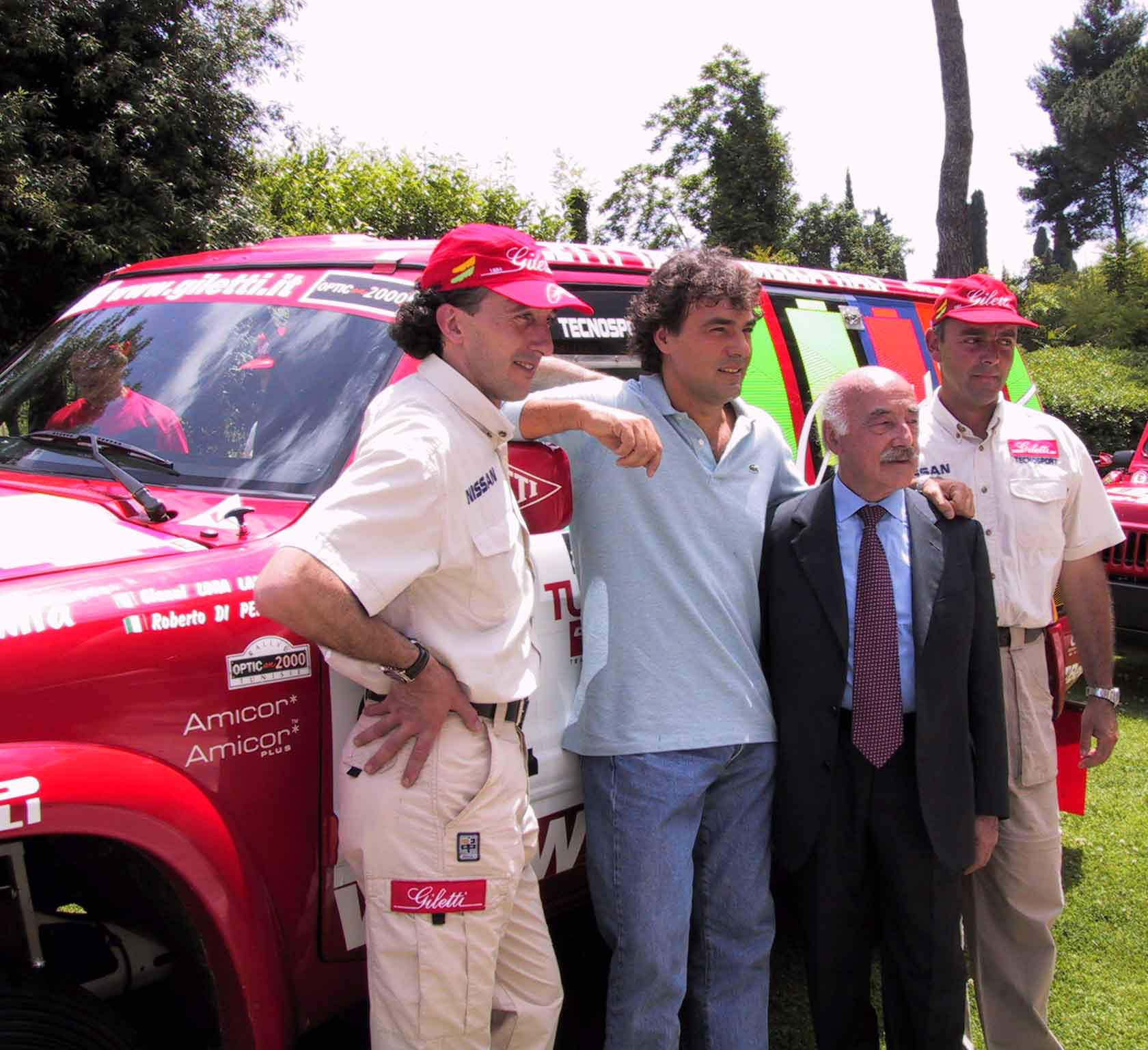
Gianni Lora Lamia and codriver Roberto di Persio with Massimo Giletti and Emilio Giletti at 2001 season of Nissan Motorsport Team presentation

Despite his passion for speed, he abandoned motorsport when he inherited the family business, Giletti S.p.A., one of the leading companies in the production of yarns. Under his control, the company became a technologically advanced company in the development of its production cycle, as well as their technical socks for sport.

In October 2012, Emilio Giletti was sentenced to nine months' imprisonment, suspended, for manslaughter following the death of a Giletti S.p.A. employee, Massimo Sasso, in September 2008.

== Racing record ==
=== Career highlights ===
Season	Series	Position	Team	Car
1952	Trofeo Sardo	1st	Scuderia Guastella	Ferrari 166 MM
	Giro di Sicilia	3rd		Lancia Aurelia B20
	Giro dell’Umbria	3rd		Ferrari 166 MM
	Circuito di Senigallia [S2.0]	3rd	Scuderia Guastella	Ferrari 166 MM
1953	Targa Florio	2nd	Officine Alfieri Maserati	Maserati A6GCS/53

=== Complete Mille Miglia results ===
Year	Team	Co-Drivers	Car	Class	Pos.	Class Pos.
1952	Emilio Giletti	(Italy) Walter Loro Piana	Ferrari 166 MM Barchetta Touring	S2.0	DNF	
1953		(Italy) Guerino Bertocchi	Maserati A6GCS/53	S2.0	6th	1st

=== Complete 12 Ore di Pescara results ===
Year	Team	Co-Drivers	Car	Class	Pos.	Class Pos.
1952		(Italy) Sergio Sighinolfi	Ferrari 166 MM	S+2.0	6th	4th

Sporting positions
Preceded by Di Suni; Madau	Trofeo della Reggione Sardo; 1952	Succeeded by Eugenio Castellotti
