= Roberto di Persio =

Italian rally raid co-driver

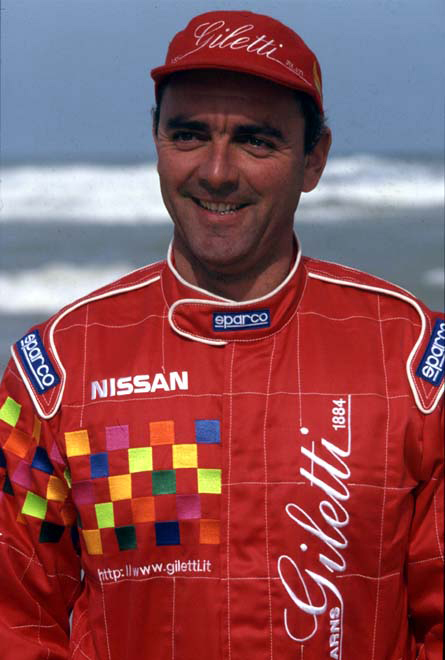
- Roberto di Persio at the Granada-Dakar 1999
- Born: October 5, 1957 (age 69); Genova, Italy
- Years active: 1991 – 2011
- Honours: "Dakar Legends Priority Co-Driver"
- Categorisation: (Italy) FIA International C Licence IT 45929d
Dakar Rally career
- Years active: 1991 Paris-Tripoli-Dakar; 1992 Paris-Sirte-Cape Town; 1993 Paris-Dakar; 1995 Granada-Dakar; 1999 Granada-Dakar; 2000 Paris-Dakar-Cairo; 2001 Paris-Dakar; 2002 Arras-Madrid-Dakar; 2003 Marseille-Valencia-Sharm El Sheik; 2004 Clermont Ferrand-Dakar; 2005 Barcellona-Dakar; 2006 Lisboa-Dakar; 2007 Lisboa-Dakar; 2010 Dakar Rally; 2011 Dakar Rally; 2012 Dakar Rally
- Teams: (Germany) Mercedes-Benz Nissan France (Japan) Nismo (Japan) Mitsubishi Motors Ralliart (Italy) Nissan Promotech (Italy) Macmoter (China) Chery Automobile (Italy) Nissan Tecnosport
- Starts: 16
- Best finish: 14th Overall in the Granada-Dakar 1999

Roberto di Persio (born 5 October 1957) in Genoa,Italy, is an Italian Rally raid Co-driver who competed in the Dakar Rally and in rally raid events.

He studied veterinary medicine at the University of Genoa, he lived for many years in the city of Diano Marina in Liguria and then at the end of the 90s moved to the city of Quartu Sant'Elena in the province of Cagliari in Sardinia.

He has participated in 16 editions of the Dakar Rally from 1991 to 2007 and is on the priority list of co-drivers with more than 10 participation in the Dakar Rally, called Dakar Legend Priority. created by the organization of the race A.S.O. Amaury Sport Organisation

== Racing career ==
His first participation was in the 1991 Paris–Dakar Rally, with the Sardinian female driver Claudia Zuncheddu in a Mercedes-Benz G-Class 240 GD, from 1991 to 2003 for 8 editions of the Dakar rally he was the co-driver of the Italian driver Gianni Lora Lamia, with whom he achieved his best overall result 14th at the Granada-Dakar 1999.

Since 2004 he has been the co-driver of other Italian and international drivers, such as Marco Tempestini and Maurizio Traglio, he was the co-driver of the Japanese Kenjiro Shinozuka at the 2006 and 2007 Dakar Rally and in his last races before his final retirement. He was the co-driver of the Chinese driver Lu Ningjun at the Rally Dakar 2010 and 2011 Dakar Rally with the Chinese Chery Automobile team.
