= Giuseppe Tuffanelli =

Italian racing driver

Giuseppe Tuffanelli is a former Italian racing driver. He participated in twelve races between 1930 and 1937, most of which were Mille Miglia.

== Complete results ==
Year	Date	Race	Entrant	Car	Teammate(s)	Result
1930	April 13	Mille Miglia		Bugatti T37	Sergio Mantovani	37th
1931	April 12	Mille Miglia	Giuseppe Tuffanelli	Maserati 26C (8C 1100)	Guerino Bertocchi	22nd
1932	April 10	Mille Miglia			Guerino Bertocchi	20th
1932	April 24	Rome Grand Prix			Maserati 8C 1100	2nd
1933	April 9	Mille Miglia		Maserati 4CS	Guerino Bertocchi	DNF
1933	June 29	Circuito di Sassari		Maserati		3rd
1933	October 8	Coppa Principessa di Piemonte		Maserati 1500		8th
1935	April 14	Mille Miglia		Alfa Romeo 8C 2300 Monza	Giovanni Battaglia	3rd
1935	August 15	XII Coppa Acerbo		Maserati		DNF
1935	August 25	II Prix de Berne	Giuseppe Tuffanelli	Maserati 4CM		4th
1935	September 15	II Circuito di Modena Junior	Giuseppe Tuffanelli	Maserati 4CM		2nd
1937	April 4	Mille Miglia		Alfa Romeo 8C 2300	Vittorugo Mallucci	DNF
