= Lu Ningjun =

Chinese rally driver

- Nationality: (China) Chinese
- Born: 1957 (age 68–69)

Lu Ningjun (Chinese: 芦宁军; pinyin: Lú Níngjūn, 1957) is a Chinese rally driver.

== Biography ==
Lu Ningjun was born in a military family in 1957. In 1975, he enlisted in the People's Liberation Army Air Force and in 1982 was transferred to the Chinese Special Police Force, where guided the training of special car drivers. In 1985, he took part in the Hong Kong-Beijing Rally. In the same year, Lu was sent to study professional racing driving to the United Kingdom, and in 1988 to Japan. In 1996, he participated in the Paris-Moscow-Beijing cross-country rally, in 1998 in the Asia-Pacific Rally Championship, winning the Group N and N4 and being awarded as the Best Chinese Driver, hailed by the media as "The King of Chinese Cars". He has won 13 times the National Rally Championship. In 2024 he took part in a Nio ET5 to the EcoRally Cup China.

Lu has always been active in social campaigns and promotion of motorsports. He received the “Golden Champagne Achievement Award” from the China Automobile Federation and other prizes.
