= Émile V. Schlesser =

Luxembourgish film director

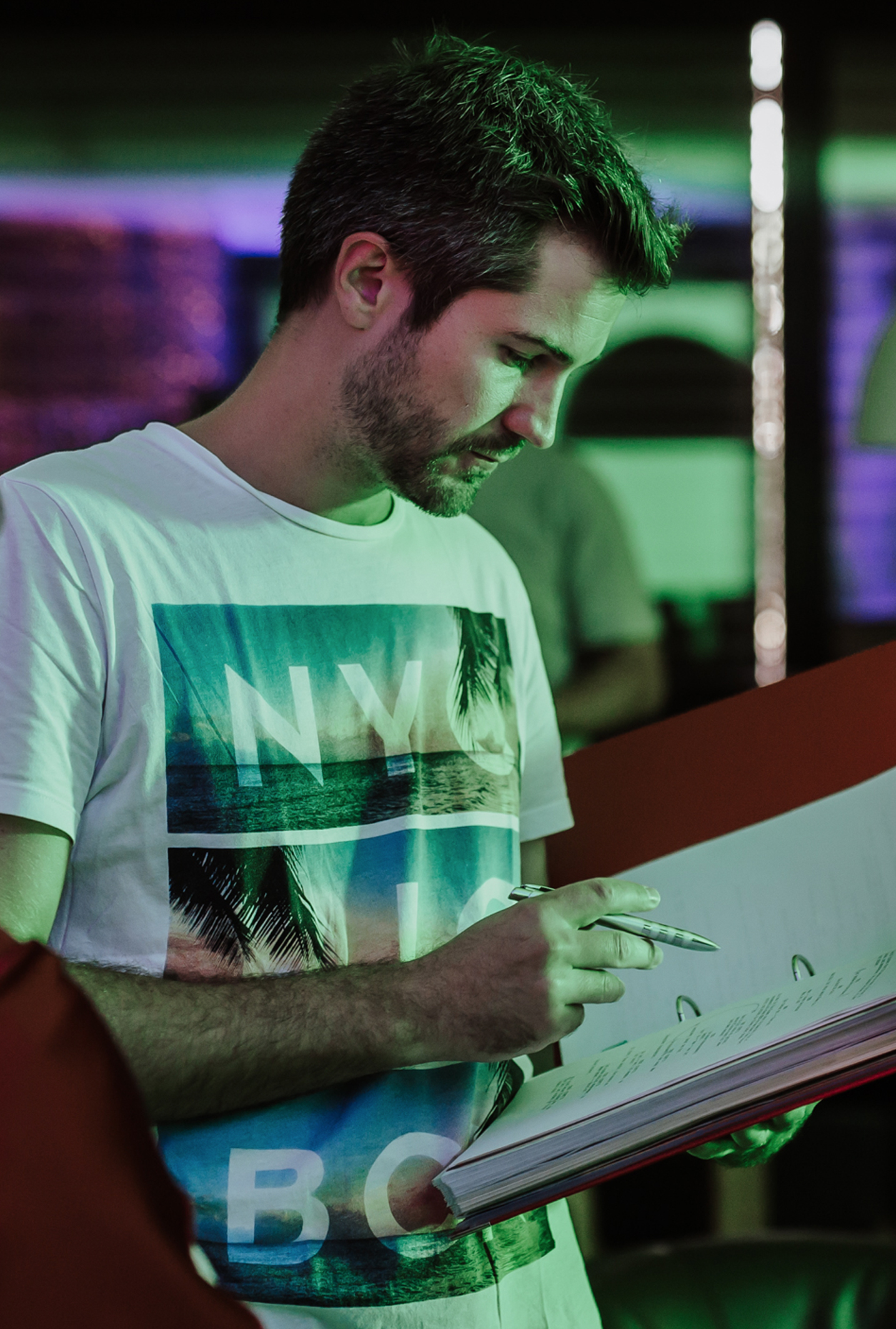
- Born: Luxembourg City, Luxembourg
- Education: Kunstakademie Düsseldorf
- Occupations: director, screenwriter, composer, actor, artist
- Years active: 2008–present
- Website: emileschlesser.com

Émile V. Schlesser is a Luxembourgish film director, screenwriter, composer and multimedia artist.

== Biography ==
Émile V. Schlesser was born in Luxembourg City. He studied painting with Markus Lüpertz at the Kunstakademie Düsseldorf from 2007 to 2009, followed by studies in video and film with Marcel Odenbach. In 2018 he graduated with the title "Meisterschüler" (master student).

In 2015, he made the short film Roxy, marking the start of his collaboration with producer and director Fabien Colas. Schlesser financed the production by selling his paintings created during his art studies. His next short film Superhero, starring Maria Dragus, Jannik Schümann and Nico Randel, won the 13th Street Shocking Short Award in 2020. This award is presented every year by NBC Universal at the Munich Film Festival. In 2021 he made two more short films, Vis-a-Vis (starring his brother, actor Tommy Schlesser) and the tragicomic satire Kowalsky.

He lives in Luxembourg and Düsseldorf. In addition to his native Luxembourgish, Schlesser is fluent in German, English and French.

== Filmography ==
Year	Title	Director	Writer	Editor	Composer	Producer	Notes
2015	Roxy	No	Yes	Yes	No	Yes	short film, Role: Jeff
2020	Superhero	Yes	Yes	Yes	Yes	No	short film
2021	Vis-a-Vis	Yes	Yes	Yes	No	Yes	short film
2022	Kowalsky	Yes	Yes	Yes	Yes	No	short film

== Awards and nominations ==
For Superhero

- 2020: Shocking Short Award by NBC Universal/13th Street
- 2020: „Prädikat: Wertvoll“ by Deutsche Film- und Medienbewertung (FBW)

For Vis-a-Vis

- 2021: Lëtzebuerger Filmpräis (nominated)
