= Jaroslav Katriňák =

Slovak endurance motorcycle racer (born 1966)

Jaroslav Katriňák (born 25 April 1966 in Martin) is a Slovak endurance motorcycle racer. Among his greatest achievements is achieving first overall in the Enduro World Championship in 1991, in the category of + 350 cc 4T and 9th overall place at 2007 Dakar Rally in the motorcycles classification. In the summer of 2008, he won the Rally Transorientale St. Petersburg - Beijing. In December 2008, he underwent a successful liver transplant. After the transplant he began to ride on ATVs and quads as part of the Can-Am racing team. His first major result was the winning of HUNT-THE-WOLF-2010, one of the hardest and most technical ATV race in Europe.
