= Massimo Giletti =

Italian television presenter, television writer, and journalist (born 1962)

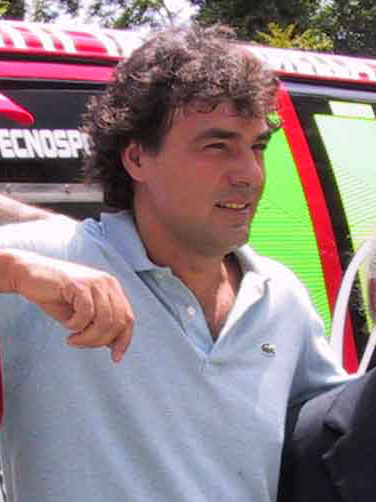
- Giletti in 2000
- Born: Massimo Giletti; 18 March 1962 (age 63); Turin, Italy
- Occupations: Television presenter; television writer; journalist; producer
- Years active: 1994 – present
- Height: 1.80 m (5 ft 11 in)

Massimo Giletti (born 18 March 1962) is an Italian television presenter, television writer, and journalist.

== Career ==
Giletti was born in a wealthy family from Piedmont. His father Emilio Giletti was a racing driver and industrialist, owner of a textile factory in the province of Biella. He started working as a journalist with Giovanni Minoli working in the staff of Rai 2 programme Mixer, for six years. In 1994, he started working as a television host in the daily Rai 2 programmes Mattina in famiglia and Mezzogiorno in famiglia, with Paola Perego. In 1996, he left those programmes and started presenting another show, I fatti vostri, working there until 2002.

Between the 1990s and 2000s, Giletti hosted other shows like Il Lotto alle Otto, the charity TV marathon Telethon and the primetime show La grande occasione. From September 2002 he switched to Rai 1 presenting the afternoon show Casa Raiuno, which aired for two seasons. In the summer of 2003, he presented the primetime show Beato tra le donne. In 2004 and 2005, he hosted the Sunday afternoon show Domenica in with Mara Venier and Paolo Limiti, and also began presenting just a segment of Domenica in – L'Arena.

In the 2000s, Giletti presented the event shows Miss Italia nel Mondo, Sanremo dalla A alla Z, Una voce per Padre Pio, Mare latino and Buon Natale con Frate Indovino. In 2009 and 2010, he was in the cast of the primetime show Ciak si... canta!. In March 2021, Giletti made a factually incorrect observation during the popular Rai 1 TV programme Domenica in – L'Arena when he stated that the Maltese Armed Forces shoot African boat people approaching Malta. He later retracted his statement.

== Television ==
- Mattina in famiglia (Rai 2, 1994–1996)
- Mezzogiorno in famiglia (Rai 2, 1994–1996)
- I fatti vostri (Rai 2, 1996–2002)
- Il Lotto alle Otto (Rai 2, 2000)
- La grande occasione (Rai 2, 2000)
- Casa Raiuno (Rai 1, 2002–2004)
- Beato tra le donne (Rai 1, 2003)
- Domenica in – L'Arena (Rai 1, 2004–2013)
- Miss Italia nel Mondo (Rai 1, 2007, 2010)
- Sanremo dalla A alla Z (Rai 1, 2007–2008)
- Una voce per Padre Pio (Rai 1, 2007–2010)
- Mare latino (Rai 1, 2009–2010)
- Buon Natale con Frate Indovino (Rai 1, 2010)
- L'Arena (Rai 1, 2013–2017)
- Non è l'Arena (La7, since 2017)
