= Group T1 =

FIA cross-country rally car group

In relation to motorsport, Group T1 is a set of technical specifications for prototype cross-country cars used in off-road Cross-Country Rallying (also called Rally Raid). The group is governed by the Fédération Internationale de l'Automobile (FIA) and defined in appendix J, article 285 of its International Sporting Code. The cars are single unit builds and may be based on a spaceframe chassis unlike the strict series production bodyshell requirement in Group T2. However, the engine must come from, or be derived from a production car able to be homologated in Group A, Group GT or Group T2. The cars must be powered by one engine and without driving aids such as traction control or ABS.

== History ==
Group T1 was first introduced in 1990 when the generic Group T, introduced the year before, was divided into four specific categories of cross-country vehicles. Until 2003 T1 was for series production cross-country cars, and prototype cars were placed in Group T3. However the modern arrangement, with T1 vehicles in Category II for competition vehicles, has been in place since 2004. These cars have been competing in Baja Cross Country Rallies, Rally Raids and Marathon Rallies since their inception, including in the FIA World Cup for Cross Country Rallies.

== Classes ==
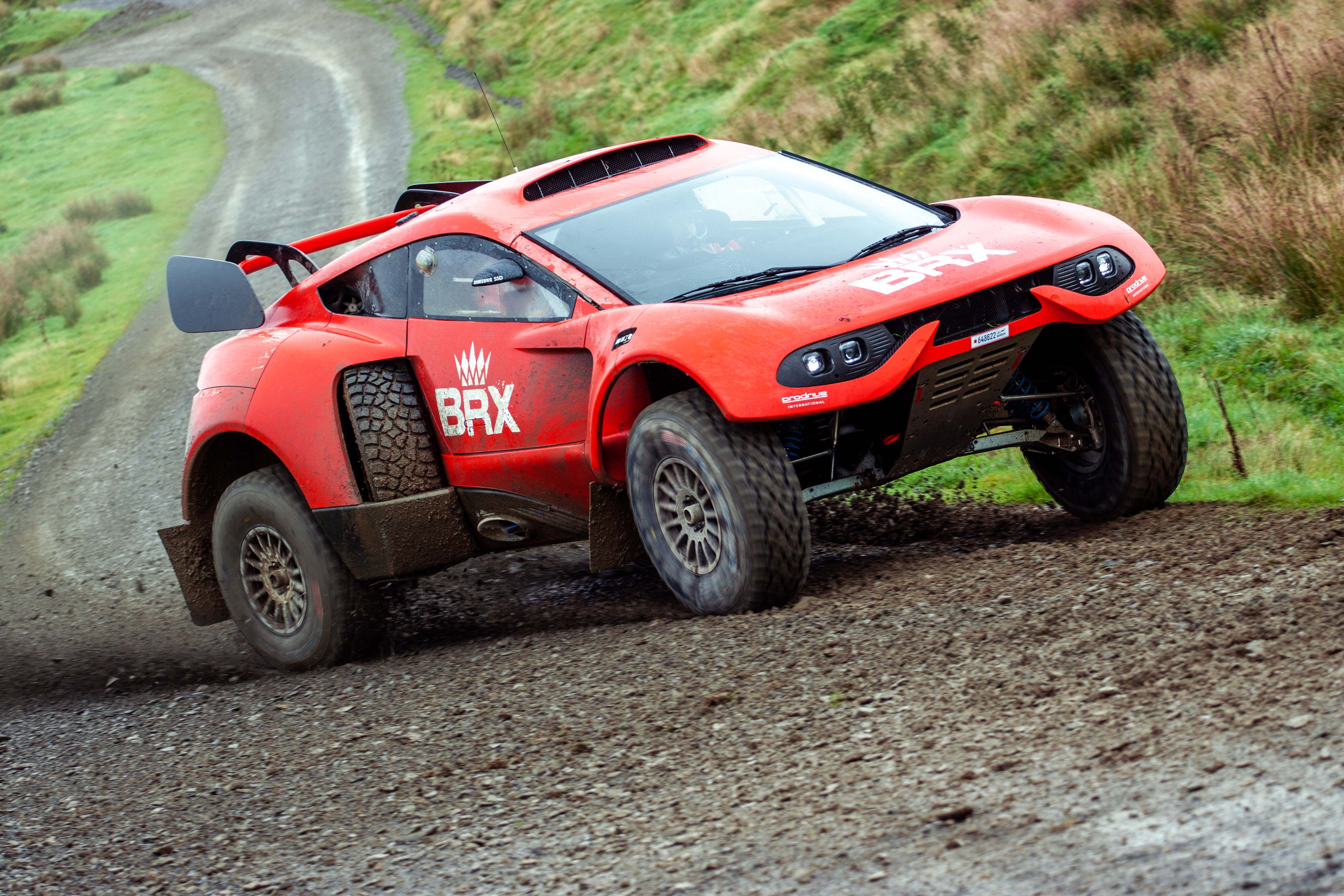
BRX Prodrive Hunter T1.1 (T1+)

When competing in the FIA World Rally-Raid Championship, which includes the long established Dakar Rally, there are four classes within the group:

- T1.U - 'Ultimate' cars powered by electric motors, hydrogen combustion engine or hybrid combustion and electric
- T1.1 - 4x4 cars (includes T1+ cross-country-type vehicles which permit larger size vehicles)
- T1.2 - 4x2 cars
- T1.3 - Cars complying with SCORE International regulations

== Cars ==
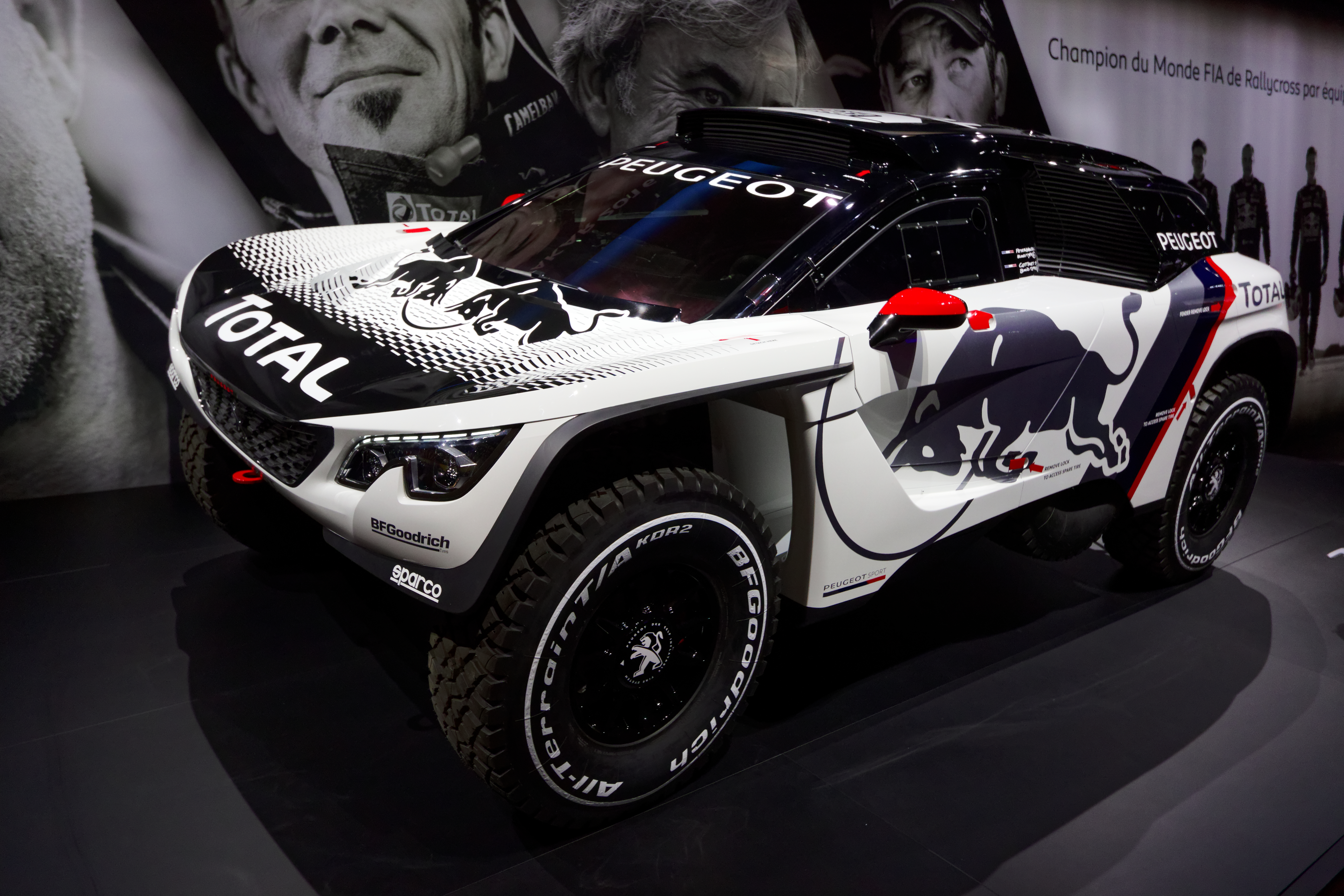
Peugeot 3008 DKR

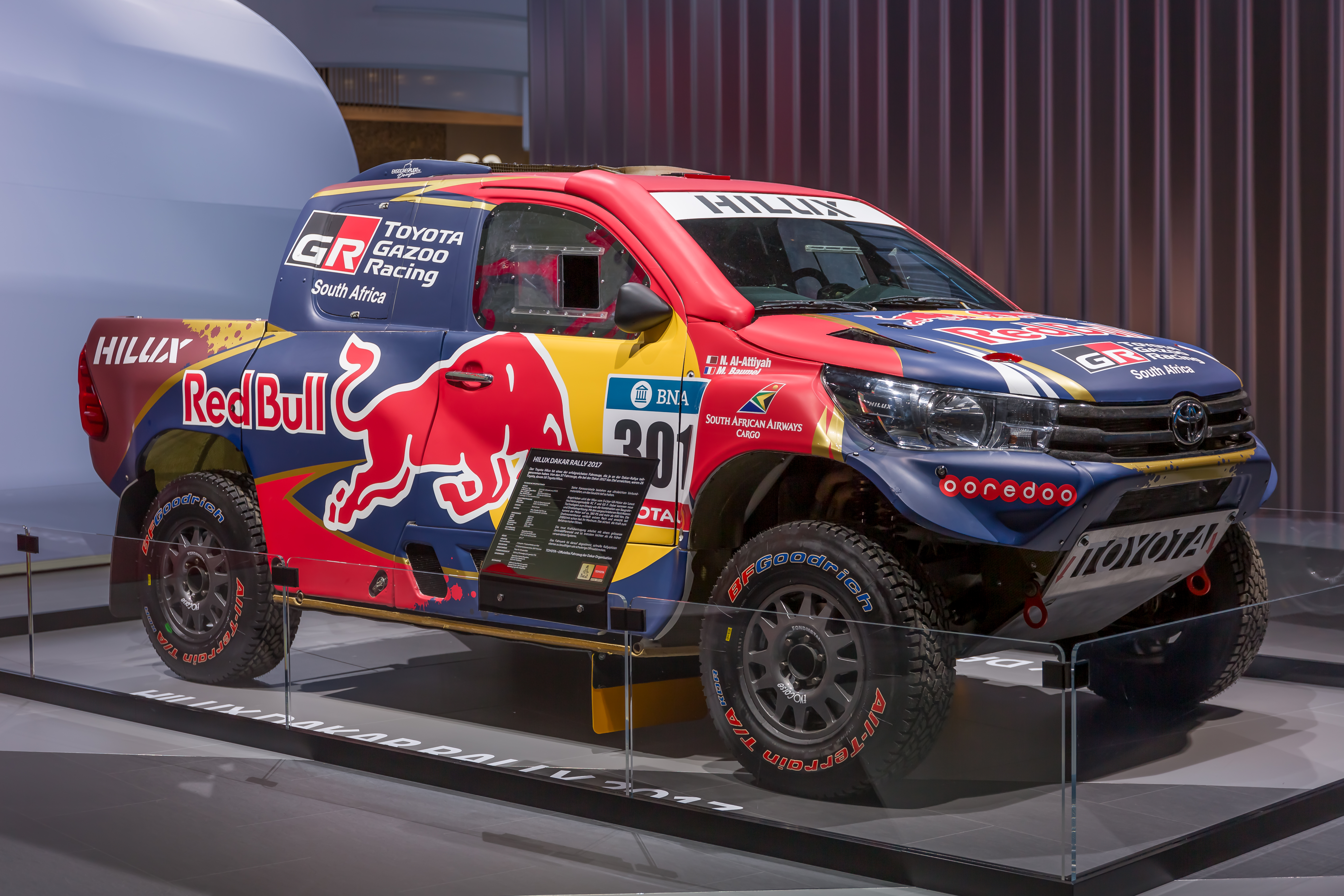
Toyota Hilux Dakar Rally

Examples of each class include:

- T1.U
  - Audi RS Q e-tron
- T1.1
  - Mini John Cooper Works Rally
  - Mini All4 Racing
  - Bowler Wildcat
  - Prodrive Hunter
  - Toyota GR DKR Hilux
  - Dacia Sandrider
  - Ford Raptor T1+
  - Aston Martin Dreadnought
- T1.2
  - Peugeot 3008 DKR
  - Mini John Cooper Works Buggy
- T1.3
  - Volkswagen Tarek
  - Chevrolet LCR30
  - Hummer H3

Manufacturer	Model	Image	Debut	Applications
(United Kingdom) Aston Martin	Dreadnought		2027	T1.1
(Germany) Audi	RS Q e-tron		2022	T1.U
(Germany) Borgward	BX7 Evo			T1.1
(United Kingdom) Bowler	Bulldog		2022	T1.1
(United Kingdom) Bowler	Nemesis		2007	
(United Kingdom) Bowler	Wildcat		1998	T1.1
(Germany) BMW	X3 Cross Country		2009	
(South Africa) Century	Buggy			T1.3
(South Africa) Century	CR6		2021	T1.3
(South Africa) Century	CR6-T		2024	T1.2
(South Africa) Century	CR7		2023	T1.1
(United States) Chevrolet	LCR30			T1.3
(France) Citroën	ZX Rallye Raid		1991	
(Romania) Dacia	Sandrider		2024	T1.1
(United Kingdom) Ford	Ranger T1+		2023	T1.1
(United Kingdom) Ford	Raptor RS Cross Country		2024	T1.1
(United Kingdom) Ford	Raptor T1+		2024	T1.1
(Russia) GAZ	NEXT		2020	
(France) GCK	Thunder		2022	T1.U
(Italy) Fiat	PanDakar		2006	
(United States) Hummer	H3		2010	T1.3
(United Kingdom) Mini	All4 Racing		2011	T1.1
(United Kingdom) Mini	John Cooper Works Buggy		2017	T1.2
(United Kingdom) Mini	John Cooper Works Rally		2016	T1.1
(Japan) Mitsubishi	Pajero Evolution		1984	
(Japan) Mitsubishi	Racing Lancer		2008	
(Japan) Nissan	NP300 Pickup		2020	
(Japan) Nissan	Proto		2022	T1.1
(Japan) Nissan	VK56		2022	T1.1
(France) Peugeot	3008 DKR		2017	T1.2
(United Kingdom) Prodrive	Hunter		2021	T1.1
(Switzerland) Rebellion	DXX		2020	T1.3
(France) Schlesser	Buggy		1992	T1.1
(Japan) Toyota	Hilux Dakar		2012	T1.1
(Germany) Volkswagen	Amarok		2017	
(Germany) Volkswagen	Race Touareg		2004	
(Germany) Volkswagen	Race Touareg 2		2006	
(Germany) Volkswagen	Race Touareg 3		2011	
(Germany) Volkswagen	Tarek		2003	T1.3

== See also ==
- Cross-Country Cars
  - Group T1 - prototype
  - Group T2 - series production
- Lightweight Cross-Country Vehicles
  - Group T3 - prototype
  - Group T4 - series production side-by-side vehicles
- Cross-Country Trucks
  - Group T5 - prototype and series production
