= Toyota in motorsport =

Since its introduction to motorsport in the early 1970s, Toyota has been involved in a number of motorsport activities, most notably in Formula One, NASCAR, IndyCar, sports car racing, various off-road rallies and the WRC. Currently, Toyota participates in the Toyota Racing Series, Super Formula, Formula Three, Formula Drift, NHRA, USAC, Super GT, NASCAR, Supercars Championship, the WRC and the WEC.

Since 2015, all of Toyota's motorsport activities are handled by Toyota Gazoo Racing.

Toyota also has a technical alliance with Haas F1 Team.

== Rallying ==
Toyota's presence in motorsport can be traced back to the latter part of 1972, when Swedish driver, Ove Andersson, drove for Toyota during the RAC Rally of Great Britain. During the winter of 1972, Andersson formed Andersson Motorsport in his native country and began running a rallying program for Toyota. The move turned out to be an impractical one and three years after establishing his team, Andersson moved its base from Sweden to Brussels in Belgium. The team was renamed to Toyota Team Europe.

Toyota's first win in motorsport came at the 1975 1000 Lakes Rally in Finland, when Hannu Mikkola and his co-driver Atso Aho won the event in a Toyota Corolla. Three years later, the team moved to a new base in Cologne, in western Germany. It was not until the 1980s when Toyota began to gain continuous World Rally Championship success, especially in the long-distance African rallies, where Björn Waldegård and Juha Kankkunen were usually top of the time sheets. The team then set-up its all-purpose motorsport facility in Cologne three years later, which is still used today.

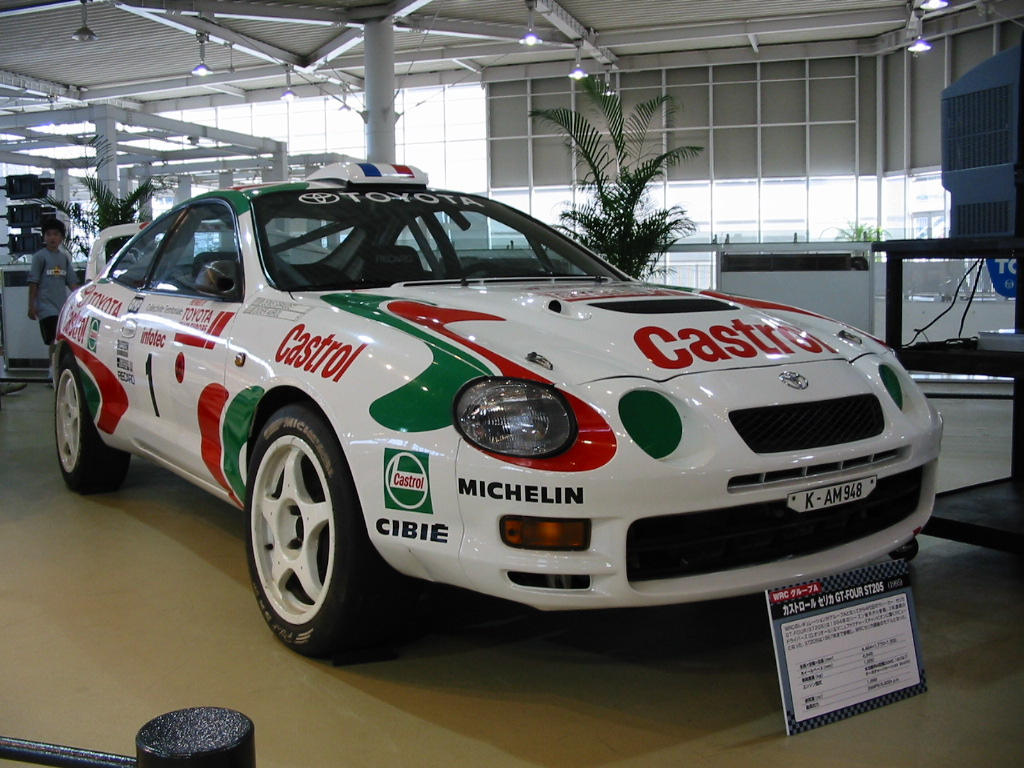
Group A -category Toyota Celica GT-Four ST205.

In the 1990 season, Carlos Sainz won the drivers' title, giving Toyota its first-ever world championship title in a four-wheel drive Toyota Celica, and repeated the feat two years later. In 1993, Toyota bought the team from Andersson and named it Toyota Motorsport GmbH. In the same year, Kankkunen won the world title and Toyota won the manufacturers' championship, becoming the first Japanese manufacturer to do so. This success was repeated a year later, but this time it was Frenchman Didier Auriol who clinched the drivers' world championship.

In 1995, Toyota were caught using illegal turbo restrictors at the Rally Catalunya and were given a 12-month ban by the FIA. FIA president Max Mosley called the illegal turbo restrictor "the most sophisticated device I've ever seen in 30 years of motor sports." Toyota and their drivers, Kankkunen, Auriol and Armin Schwarz, were also stripped of all points in the championships. Kankkunen had been in contention for the drivers' world title. Mosley stated that "there is no suggestion the drivers were aware of what was going on."

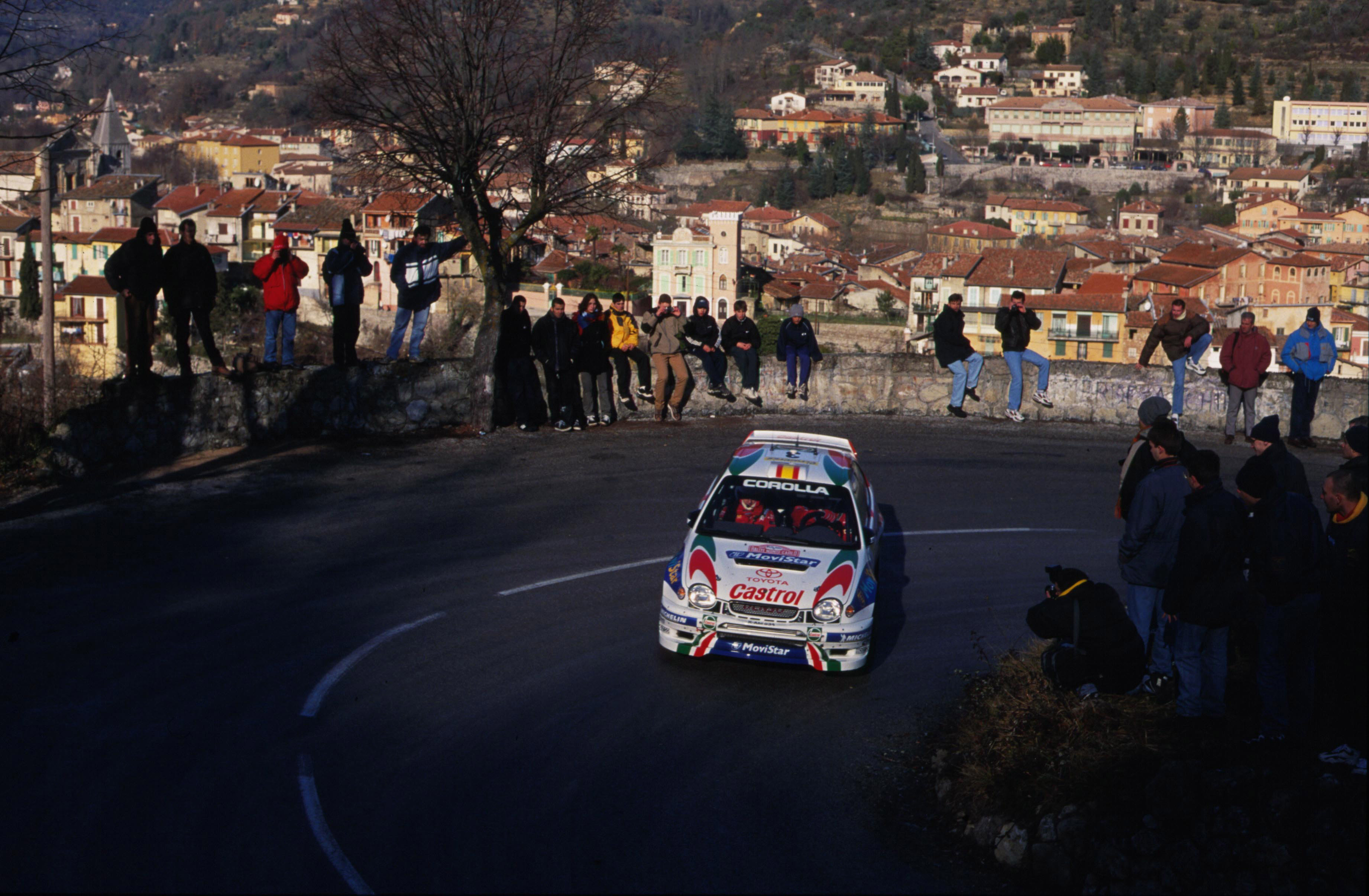
Double world champion Carlos Sainz driving a Toyota Corolla WRC at the 1999 Monte Carlo Rally.

Toyota returned to the WRC with a World Rally Car based on the Toyota Corolla. The Corolla WRC debuted at the 1997 Rally Finland, with Auriol finishing in eighth place and Marcus Grönholm retiring. In the 1998 season, Sainz came within two points of the world title, after his Corolla WRC suffered an engine failure only 500 metres from the finish of the final stage of the final rally in Great Britain. Toyota were within six points of the manufacturers' championship.

Toyota decided to quit running in the WRC at the end of the 1999 season, quoting that "all that can be achieved has been achieved." The team managed to secure the manufacturers' title in their last season, four points ahead of their nearest rival Subaru, while Auriol placed third in the drivers' championship, coming within ten points of the drivers' title, and Sainz fifth.

In March 2007, Toyota debuted its Super 2000 -category Corolla rally car, which will compete in the Australian Rally Championship.

After seventeen years of absence, Toyota entered the 2017 World Rally Championship with Toyota Gazoo Racing WRT and the Toyota Yaris WRC World Rally Car. The team is based in Finland and is run by former World Rally Champion Tommi Mäkinen. Toyota won its fourth Manufacturers title in 2018, while Ott Tänak and Sébastien Ogier won a drivers crown with the Yaris the following years. As of 2022, Toyota has six WRC Manufacturers Titles to date, promoting the brand as the third most successful Manufacturer to grace the championship.

== CART Indy Car World Series/IRL IndyCar Series ==
Toyota raced in the CART Indy Car World Series from 1996 to 2002. Its early years in the series were marked by struggles. Toyota-powered cars, campaigned by the All American Racers and PPI Motorsports teams, languished at the back of the grid, slow and unreliable. Toyota didn't even lead a lap until Alex Barron led 12 laps at the Vancouver street circuit in September 1998.

Toyota started seeing its fortunes improve in 1999 as Scott Pruett took pole position at the final race of the season at the California Speedway. The next year, Juan Pablo Montoya gave Toyota its first-ever CART win at the Milwaukee Mile, the first of 5 races won by Toyota-powered cars that year. Toyota-powered cars won six races in 2001. In 2002, Toyota's final year in the championship, it turned things around completely from its bleak debut. Toyota won the Manufacturer's championship, 10 races, and Cristiano da Matta rode Toyota power to the driver's championship, with Bruno Junqueira, also Toyota-powered car, finished second.

Toyota moved to the IRL IndyCar Series in 2003 and provided direct factory support to former CART teams Team Penske and Target Chip Ganassi Racing by receiving free engines as well as other teams. They were one of the top engines in their first year, winning the Indianapolis 500 with Gil de Ferran and the championship with Scott Dixon. However, 2004 and 2005 were not so kind and wins were few and far between. Following the 2005 IndyCar Series, Team Penske and Target Chip Ganassi Racing announced they would switch to Honda engines, leaving Toyota with no championship contenders. As a result of this and their intent to re-allocate resources for NASCAR, Toyota announced they would leave the IndyCar Series prematurely during the off-season.

Toyota still remained in the IndyCar Series as only a title sponsor for the Long Beach Grand Prix from 2009 until 2018 until it was replaced by Acura as official title sponsor of Long Beach Grand Prix from 2019 onwards.

== Le Mans and the World Endurance Championship ==
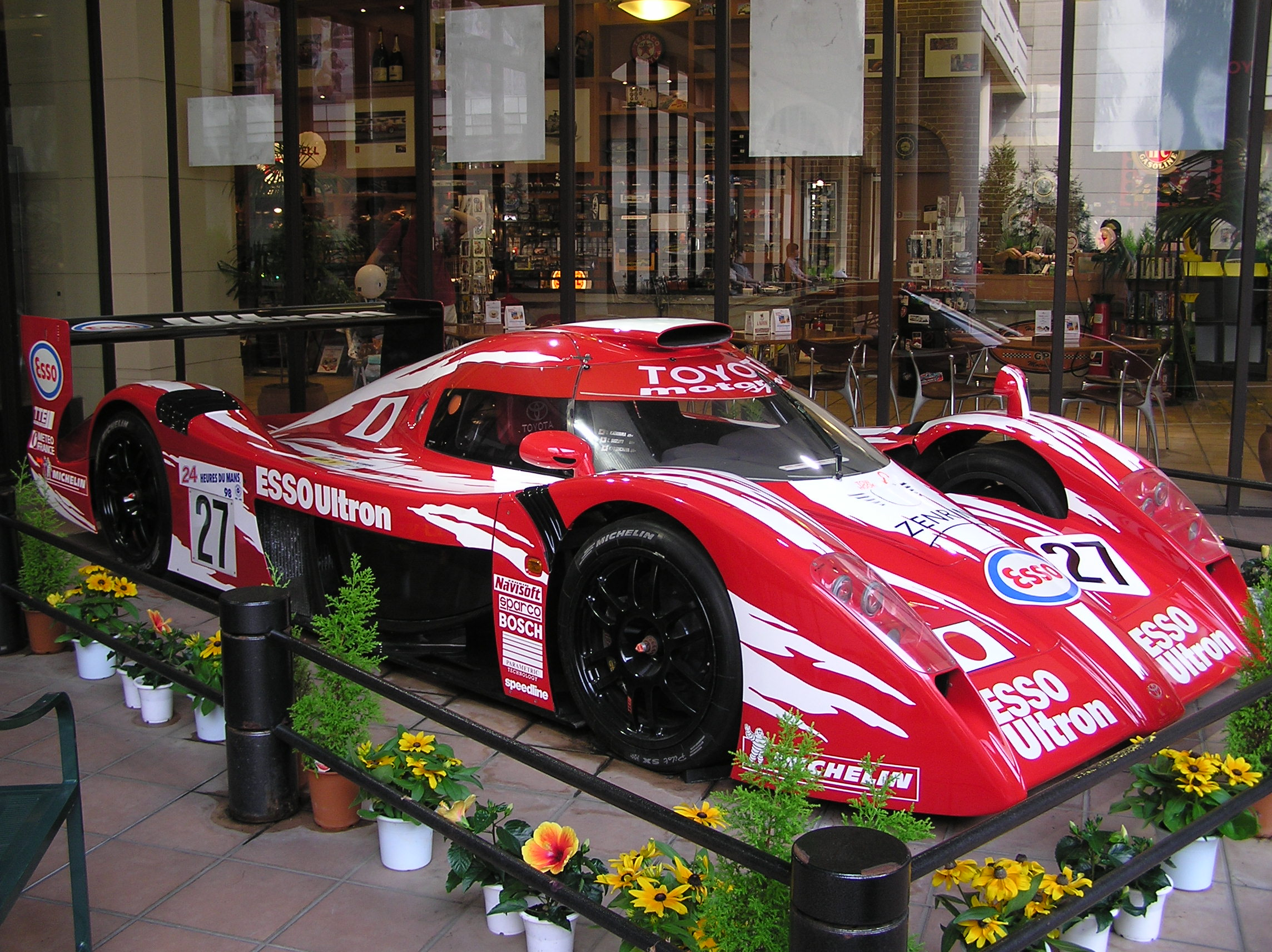
The Toyota GT-One was raced in the 1998 and 1999 24 Hours of Le Mans. Ex-Formula One drivers: Thierry Boutsen, Martin Brundle and Ukyo Katayama drove the GT-One in both events.

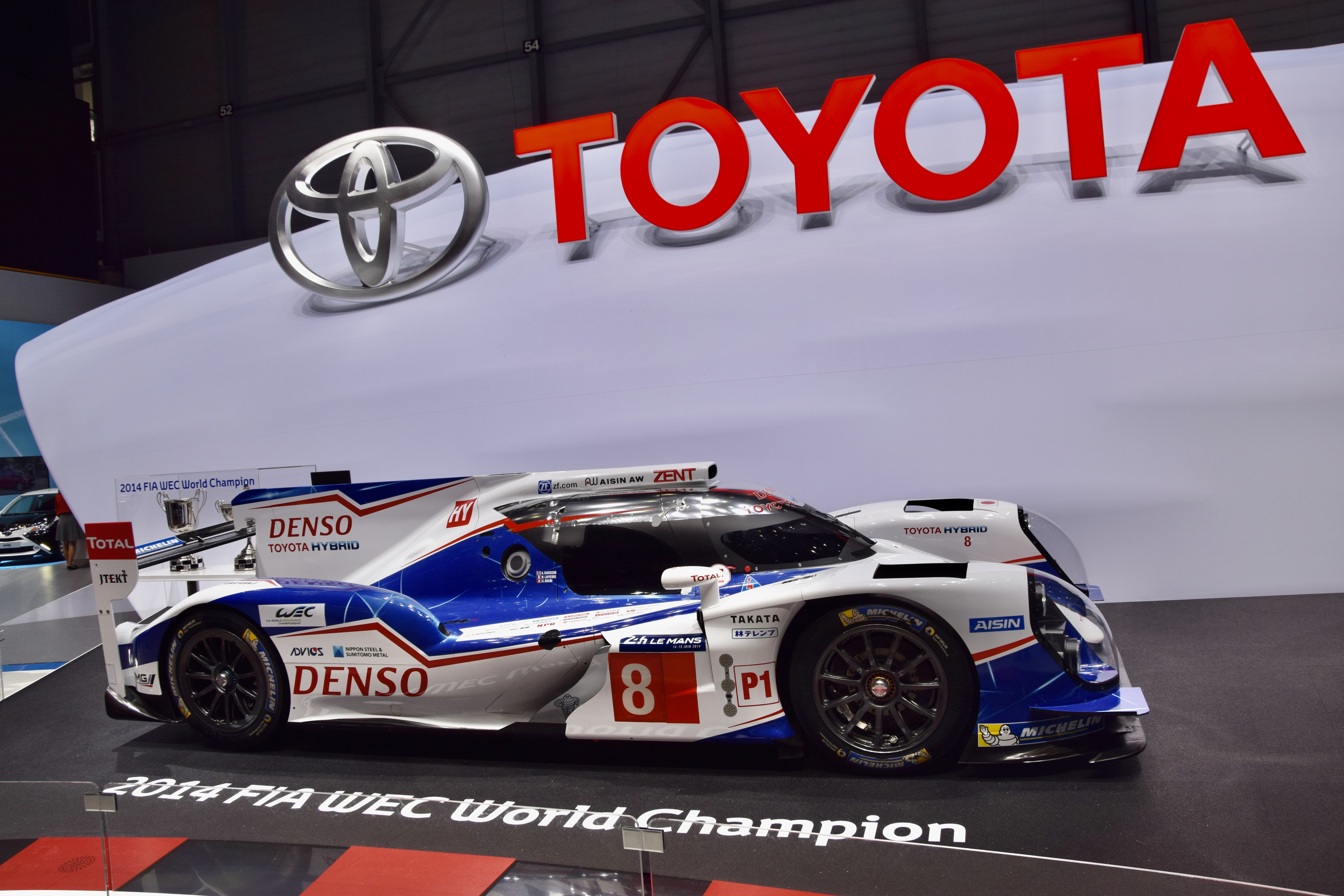
The No. 8 Toyota TS040, who won the 2014 Wec.

Toyota's 24 Hours of Le Mans efforts date back to the 1980s with Dome prepared Group C cars. Factory supported Toyota Team Tom's competed in World Sportscar Championship and Le Mans until 1994, with varying results. Toyota achieved 2nd place in the 1992 24 Hours of Le Mans.

Toyota started recruiting staff for their Le Mans efforts in 1997, with an aim to start a Formula One team. Toyota's efforts for a Le Mans car was the Toyota GT-One. Driver line-up included ex-Formula One drivers Martin Brundle, Thierry Boutsen and Ukyo Katayama. The 3.6-litre twin-turbo GT-Ones were beaten in 1998, but in 1999 they were the quickest cars in the field. However, they failed to achieve a victory after a tire failure late in the race. The GT-One held the lap record for the Circuit de la Sarthe up until 2006, however.

Toyota returned to the Le Mans 24 Hours and the FIA World Endurance Championship in 2012 with a petrol-electric hybrid car, the Toyota TS030 Hybrid.

In the 2014 FIA World Endurance Championship Toyota won the Manufacturers championship and Toyota team drivers Anthony Davidson and Sébastien Buemi won the Drivers championship in the Toyota TS040 Hybrid.

In 2016 they led the Le Mans 24 Hours for 23 hours and 55 minutes, until the car inexplicably stopped due to a mechanical failure, and the then-second placed Porsche overtook them for the win. The other Toyota went on to finish second. The initial leading Toyota eventually completed the final lap in 11 minutes and 55 seconds, but was not classified, as it could not finish the final lap in 6 minutes as required by race regulation 10.5.

After the 2017 season, both Audi and Porsche had left the series, leaving Toyota as the only manufacturer entry and the only hybrid entry in the series, including Le Mans.

In 2018, Toyota broke its curse at Le Mans when the No. 8 Toyota TS050 Hybrid won the race, becoming the second Japanese manufacturer after Mazda to win outright at the Circuit de La Sarthe. Toyota also won the following three races at Le Mans.

In 2022 Toyota secured a fifth consecutive win in the Le Mans 24 Hours.

== NASCAR ==
Toyota races the Toyota Camry in NASCAR's NASCAR Cup Series, the Toyota Supra in the O'Reilly Series, and the Toyota Tundra in the Craftsman Truck Series.

=== Goody's Dash Series ===
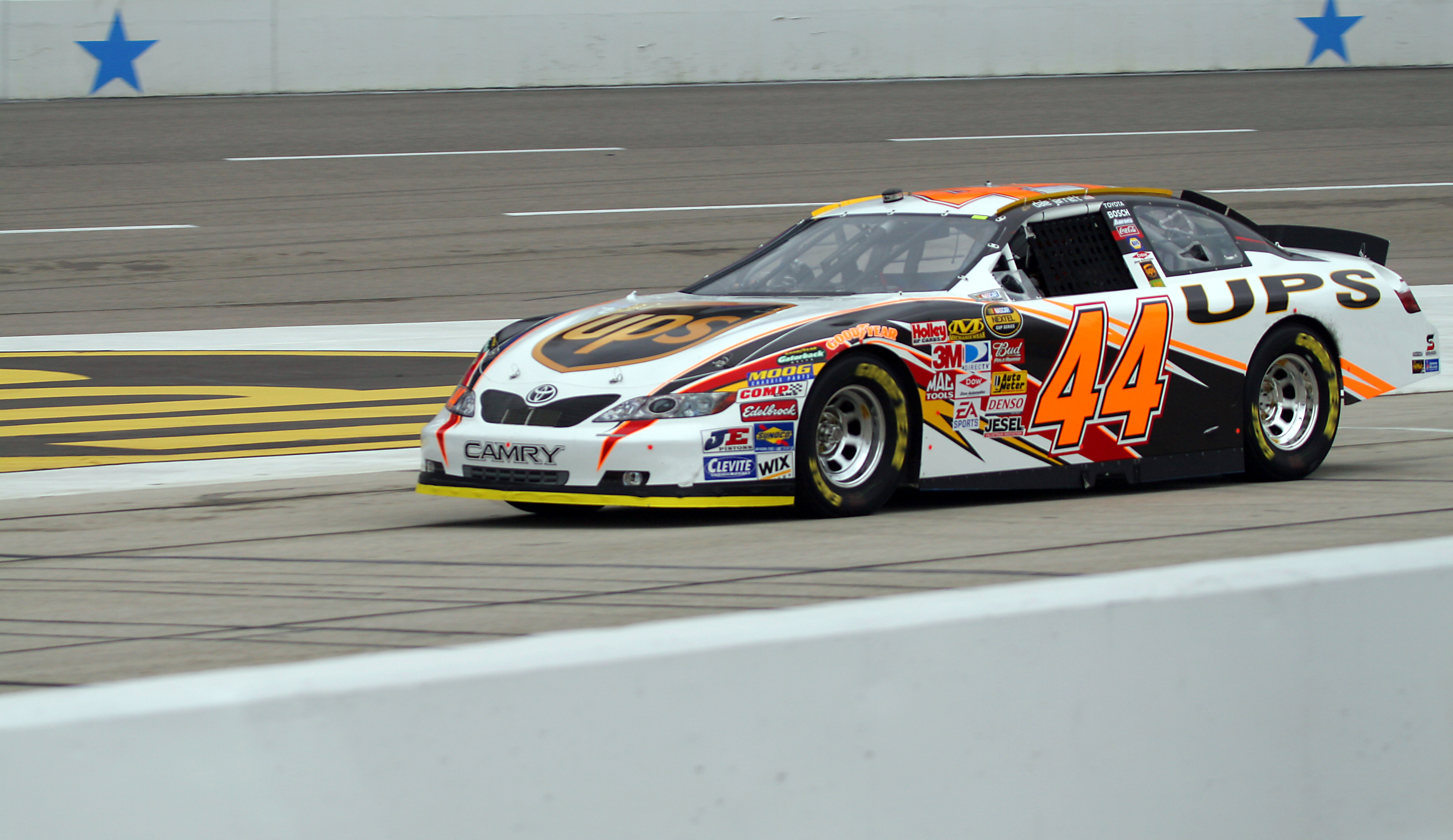
Dale Jarrett enters pit road at Texas in the No. 44 UPS Toyota Camry in Toyota's inaugural NASCAR season.

In 1981, Bill Collins drove a Toyota Celica in the then-called NASCAR International Sedan Series, where he would finish 18th at a race at Talladega. Toyota made its first factory-supported move into the NASCAR ranks with the introduction of its V6-Celica Goody's Dash program in 2000. Robert Huffman helped make Toyota a legitimate contender for the series title by its second season while placing second in the championship in both 2001 and 2002. In 2003, Huffman broke through to become Toyota's first-ever NASCAR champion to win the series title.

=== Truck Series ===
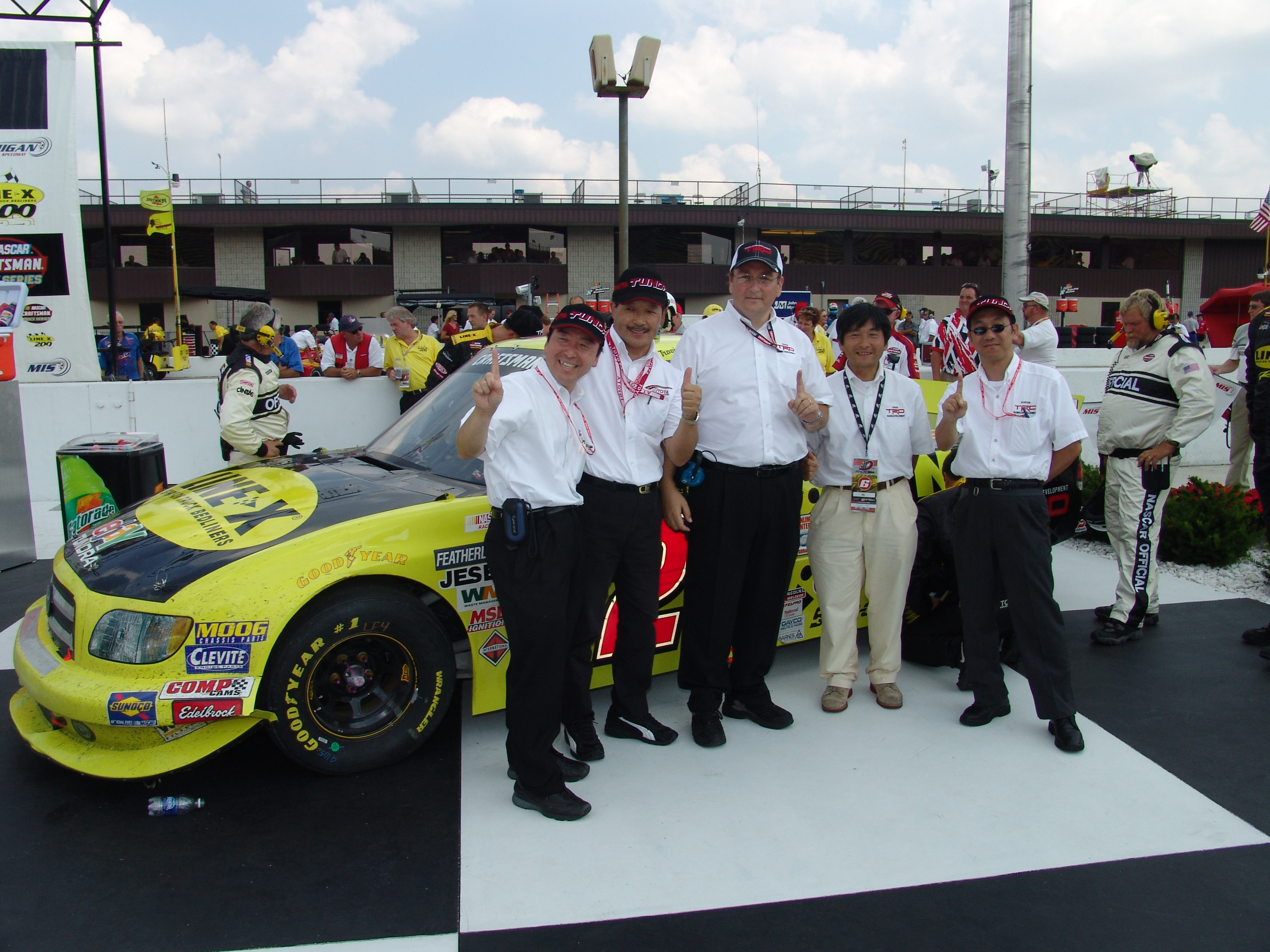
Toyota executives in front of the truck that won Toyota's first national series race.

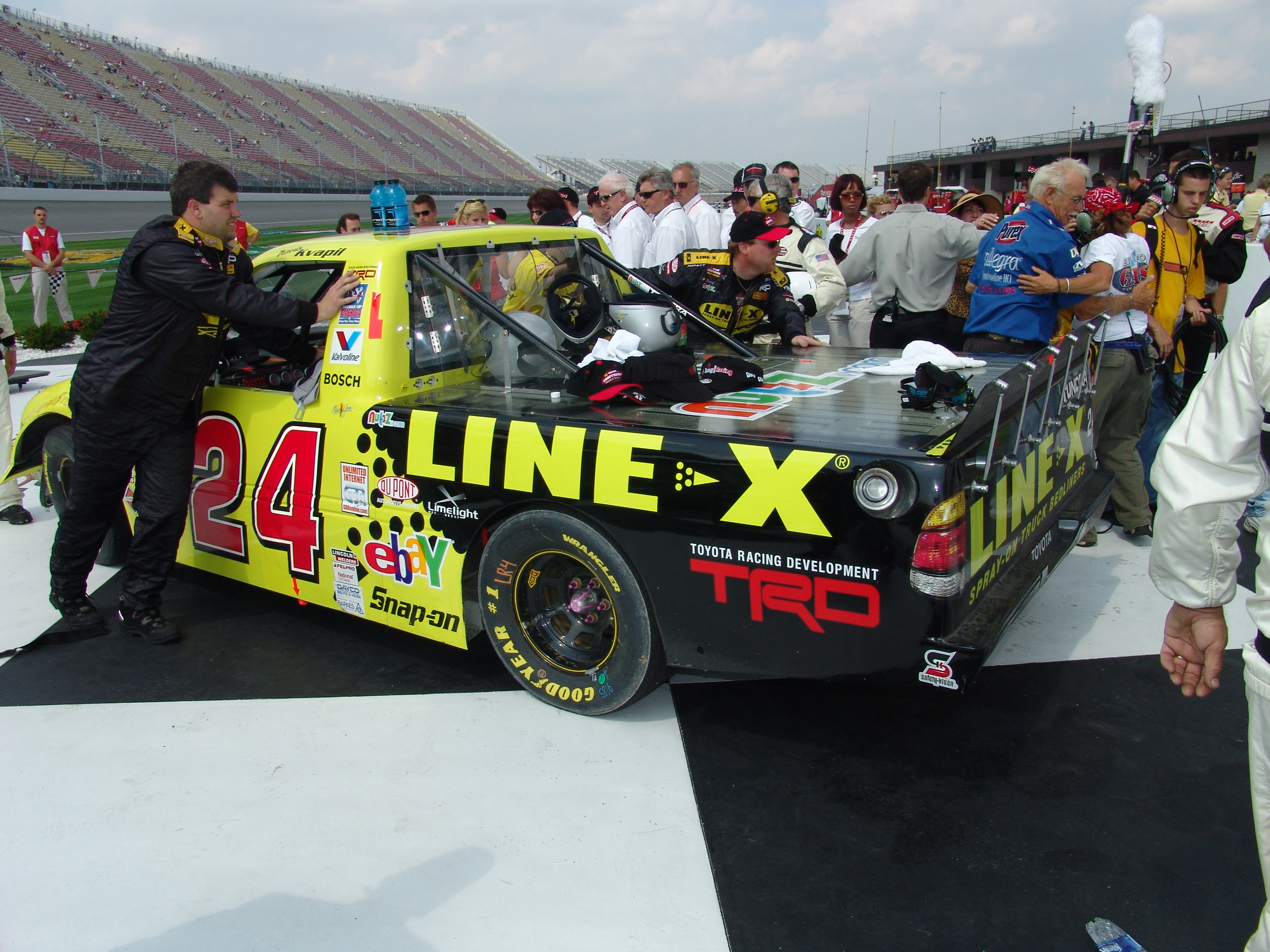
The truck driven by Travis Kvapil to Toyota's first national series win.

As of the 2021 season, Clay Greenfield Motorsports, Halmar Friesen Racing, Hattori Racing Enterprises, Kyle Busch Motorsports, G2G Motorsports and ThorSport Racing currently run the Tundra in the NASCAR Camping World Truck Series. Travis Kvapil gave Toyota its first win in a NASCAR national series, in what was then the NASCAR Craftsman Truck Series, in the 2004 Line-X 200 at Michigan International Speedway in his Tundra sponsored by Line-X and owned by Bang! Racing.

Todd Bodine became the first driver to give Toyota a NASCAR championship by winning the Truck Series title in 2006. Other driver's championships won by Toyota include Johnny Benson Jr. in 2008, Bodine in 2010, Matt Crafton in 2013 and 2014, Erik Jones in 2015 Christopher Bell in 2017, Brett Moffitt in 2018 and Ben Rhodes in 2021. Several high-profile drivers such as Kimi Räikkönen and Nelson Piquet Jr. had tested or driven Toyota trucks within the series.

=== Xfinity Series ===
As of the 2026 season, Joe Gibbs Racing and Sam Hunt Racing run Supras in the NASCAR Xfinity Series. Jason Leffler gave Toyota its first win in the series (then known as the Busch Series) in the Kroger 200 at O'Reilly Raceway Park on July 28, 2007, in his Camry owned by Braun Racing. Since 2019, Toyota has run the Supra in the series.

Kyle Busch won the series' driver's championship in 2009, while Daniel Suárez did so in 2016. Daniel Hemric won the title in 2021.

=== Cup Series ===
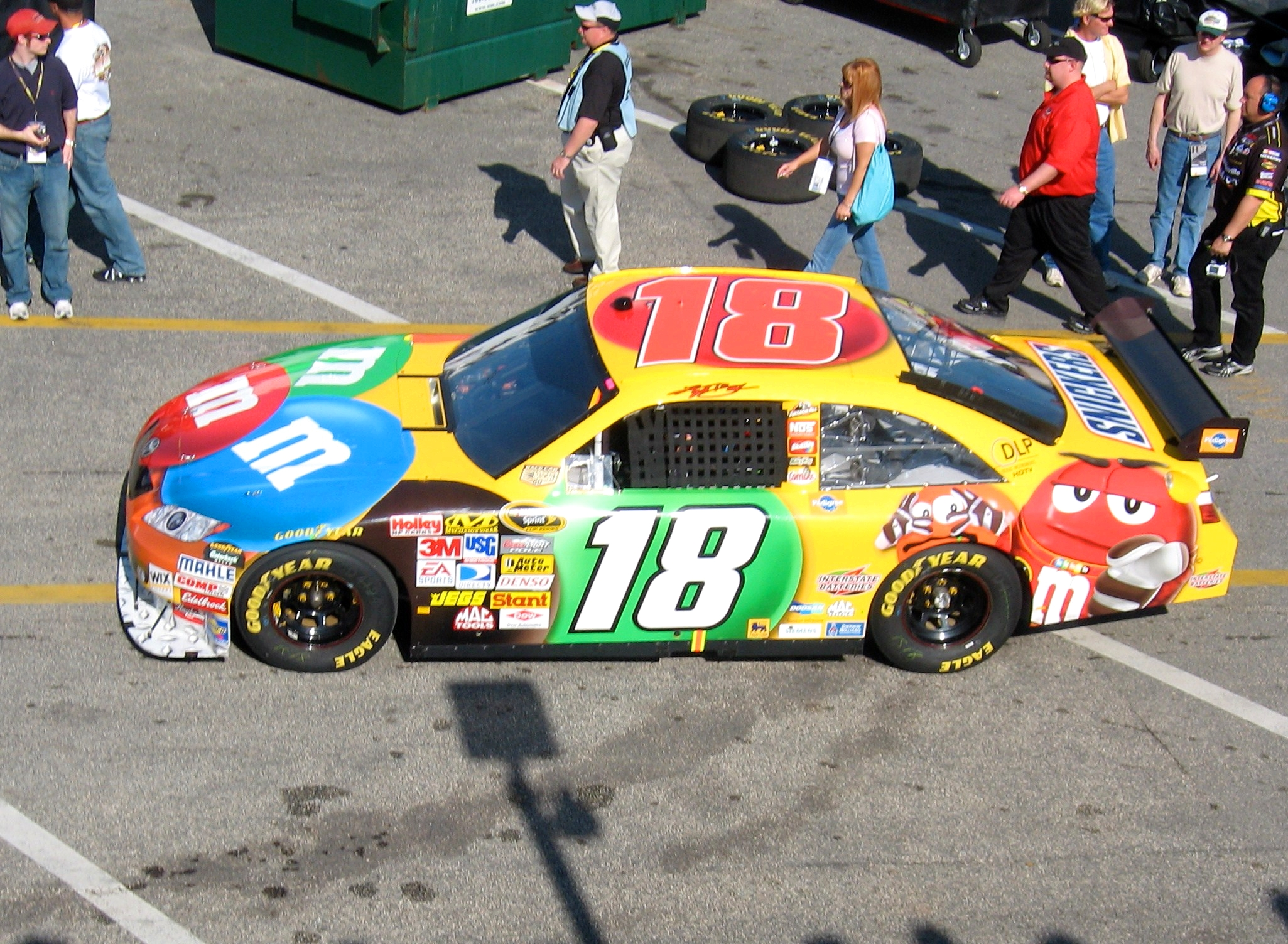
Kyle Busch has given Toyota over 150 wins across NASCAR's three national series

As of the 2024 season, 23XI Racing, Joe Gibbs Racing, and Legacy Motor Club run Toyota Camrys in the NASCAR Cup Series.

After success in the Craftsman Truck Series, Toyota moved to the then Busch Series and Nextel Cup Series with the Toyota Camry for 2007. Two relatively new teams, Michael Waltrip Racing and Red Bull Racing Team, along with long-time Cup team Bill Davis Racing spearheaded the initial Toyota Cup program. Toyota struggled in its first season in the series, harnessing only two poles in 36 races, and posting only one five top-5 and ten top-10 finishes across 7 Toyota teams. After the 2007 season, Toyota added 3-time champion Joe Gibbs Racing and affiliate Hall of Fame Racing to the Camry lineup. BAM Racing also joined Toyota Motorsports early in the 2008 season.

Kyle Busch gave Toyota its first Cup win in the Kobalt Tools 500 at Atlanta Motor Speedway on March 9, 2008; he led a race-high 173 laps in his Snickers-sponsored Camry, owned by Joe Gibbs Racing. At the end of the 2008 season, Toyota had 10 victories and Denny Hamlin and Busch finished 8th and 10th respectively in the 2008 Chase for the Sprint Cup. In 2009, Toyota would continue its successful run with a further 10 victories, 4 each for star drivers Hamlin and Busch along with surprise wins from MWR's David Reutimann and Red Bull's Brian Vickers. By this time Toyota had established itself as a regular winner in NASCAR's top series, but a championship still eluded them. Coming off back to back 10 win seasons Toyota was poised to challenge four-time defending series champion Jimmie Johnson and the Chevrolet juggernaut for the crown. After a torrid start by Johnson with wins in three of the first five races, Hamlin emerged as a real threat to the dominant Hendrick Motorsports team. Hamlin would win a series-high eight races for Toyota during the 2010 campaign and hold the points lead going into the final race of the season before an untimely incident would cost him the title. 2011 would prove to be a slightly down year for Toyota as flagship team JGR struggled to find the speed they had shown the year before.

The 2012 campaign was one of change for Toyota as they merged engine programs with Joe Gibbs Racing. To this point JGR had been building their Toyota motors in-house under Mark Cronquist while Toyota's TRD facility in California supplied Michael Waltrip's outfit. The engine merger provided for more collaboration and shared resources among the top Toyota teams with all engines being produced by TRD in California. As a result, MWR emerged as a more consistent performer, winning three races with new addition Clint Bowyer and showing much better pace with all their cars. This boost in performance, coupled with a further five wins from JGR's Hamlin, made for a successful debut season for the new engine partnership. In 2013, JGR signed veteran driver Matt Kenseth away from Roush Fenway Racing and Ford to drive the iconic No. 20 car in what would prove to be a wildly successful pairing. Kenseth, in his debut season with Toyota, won a series high 7 races in 2013 and challenged for the championship deep into the chase before eventually falling short to Jimmie Johnson. 2013 would prove to be Toyota's best in NASCAR, collecting 14 victories and challenging Chevrolet's stranglehold on the manufacturer's championship. After the success of 2013, the 2014 campaign would prove to be a monumental struggle for Toyota. After suffering a series of engine reliability problems, Toyota was forced to back down the performance of their TRD engines in the interest of preservation. The reliability problems disappeared, but as a result of the changes Toyota drivers found themselves at a significant horsepower deficit to their Chevrolet and Ford rivals. Busch would win at Auto Club Speedway in March and Hamlin would add a restrictor plate win in April at Talladega Superspeedway which would prove to be Toyota's final victory of the season. Toyota would not win again for almost a year, until Hamlin's win at Martinsville Speedway in the 6th race of the 2015 season would end the drought. Busch, who missed the first 11 races of the season with a broken leg, would win Toyota its first driver's championship that year.

In 2015, Furniture Row Racing switched from Chevrolet to Toyota and allied with JGR. Two years later, the team's Martin Truex Jr. won the manufacturer a second driver's title as he led a 1–2 Toyota championship finish with Busch. FRR ceased operations after the 2018 season, and Leavine Family Racing made their own move to Toyota for 2019. That year, Busch won his second championship. LFR folded after the 2020 season and its Toyota alliance was replaced by the newly-formed 23XI Racing.

== Formula One ==
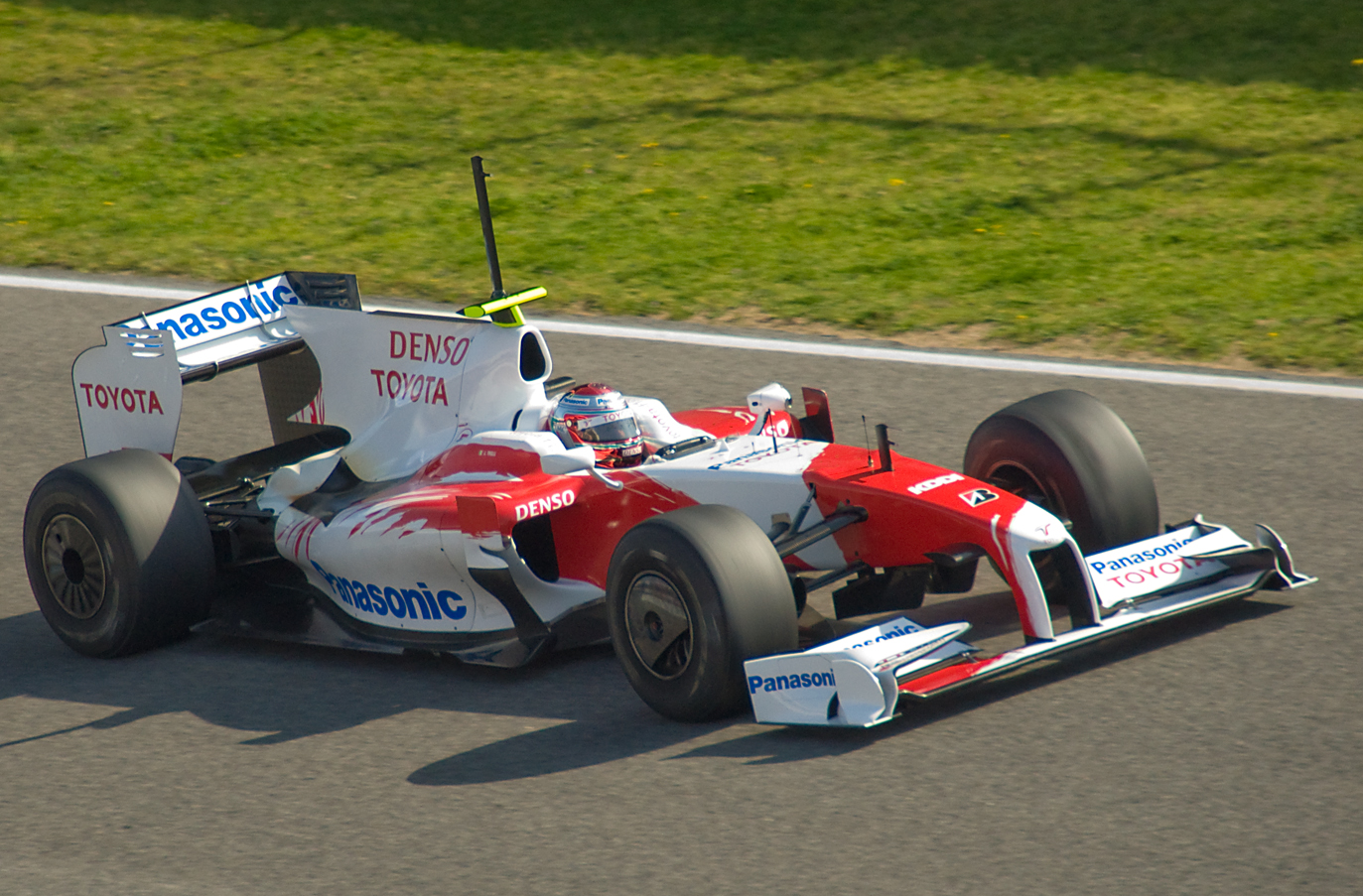
The Toyota TF109, Toyota F1's car for the 2009 Formula One season.

=== Factory team (2002–2009) ===
In 2002, Toyota started racing in Formula One with Toyota Motorsport GmbH based in Cologne, Germany. Although the team scored a point in their first race in Australia, the first two seasons delivered multiple retirements and poor finishes. In 2004, designer Mike Gascoyne was hired to improve results, following previous experience at Jordan and Renault. Under Gascoyne, Toyota gained fourth place in the constructors championship in 2005, scoring 88 points and five podium finishes in what was to be the team's best Formula One season.

However, due to a "fundamental difference of opinion with regard to the technical operations", he was released from his contract in April in the 2006 season. Replaced by Pascal Vasselon, the team's competitiveness fell and Toyota did not achieve another podium position until 2008. Toyota also began supplying customer engines in 2005, initially with Jordan Grand Prix, and continuing as the team was brought and renamed as Midland F1 and Spyker respectively. In 2007, Toyota began supplying engines to the Williams F1 team, in return for providing a drive for Kazuki Nakajima.

After an upbeat in form in 2008 and signing Jarno Trulli and Timo Glock as a replacement for Ralf Schumacher, Toyota scored its first podium since 2006. With the rule changes in the 2009 Formula One season, the sport's previous winning teams, Ferrari, McLaren, and Renault, had a poor start to the season, and Toyota joined Brawn GP with the "double diffuser" design, making the TF109 one of the fastest cars in the opening races. After scoring three third places, and qualifying one-two at the Bahrain Grand Prix, performance fell rapidly as other teams out-developed Toyota. A late season improvement in form managed two second places, including Toyota's home race in Japan, and secured fifth position.

Despite the recent improvement in results, Toyota announced its withdrawal from Formula One on 4 November 2009. Akio Toyoda announced that Toyota would be stopping both the team and the engine deal with Williams, citing the economic environment as the main deciding factor. Despite having one of the sports largest budgets, Toyota did not manage to win a Formula One race.

=== Haas F1 Team partnership ===
On 11 October 2024, the Toyota name returned to the sport with Toyota Gazoo Racing announced as a technical partner for Haas F1 Team. In December 2025, Haas signed TGR as a title sponsor and will compete as TGR Haas F1 Team from 2026 onwards.

== IMSA GT ==
In the 1980s, Toyota participated in the IMSA GT Championship, using a Toyota Celica in the GTU class. Later Toyota partnered with All American Racers team and moved to the GTP class with sports prototypes such as the Toyota Eagle HF89 and Toyota Eagle MkIII, winning the 1992 and 1993 Drivers and Manufacturers titles from the hand of the Argentinean pilot Juan Manuel Fangio II. Toyota and Lexus powered prototypes had also taken top honors in Grand-Am Rolex Sports Car Series and 24 Hours of Daytona race.

== Argentina ==
Toyota Gazoo Racing Argentina, formerly Toyota Team Argentina, is owned by Toyota's national subsidiary. They compete in TC2000, Turismo Carretera, Top Race V6 and Turismo Nacional championships. Their most successful stint is in the TC2000 (previously Súper TC2000), where they have won four drivers' championships with Norberto Fontana in 2002 and Matías Rossi in 2011, 2013 and 2020.

== Racecars ==
Year	Car	Image	Category
1968	Toyota 7		Group 7
1968	Toyota Corolla		Group C
1972	Toyota Corolla Sprinter		Group C
1977	Toyota Celica Liftback Turbo		Group 5
1979	Toyota Celica 2000GT Rally RA45		Group 4
1982	TOM'S Corolla G5		Group 5
1982	Toyota TOM'S Celica C		Group C
1983	TOM'S 83C		Group C
1983	Toyota Celica (A60)		IMSA GTO
1983	Toyota Celica Twin-Cam Turbo		Group B
1984	TOM'S 84C		Group C1
1985	Dome 85C		Group C1
1985	Toyota 222D		Group S
1986	Dome 86C		Group C1
1987	Toyota 87C		Group C1
1988	Toyota 88C		Group C1
1988	Toyota 88C-V		Group C1
1989	Eagle HF89		IMSA GTP
1989	Toyota Celica GT-Four (ST165)		Group A
1989	Toyota 89C-V		Group C1
1990	Toyota 90C-V		Group C1
1991	Eagle MkIII		IMSA GTP
1991	Toyota 91C-V		Group C1
1992	Toyota 92C-V		Group C1
1992	Toyota Celica GT-Four (ST185)		Group A
1992	Toyota TS010		Group C1
1993	Toyota 93C-V		Group C2
1994	Toyota 94C-V		LMP1
1995	Toyota Carina E ST191		Super Touring
1995	Toyota Celica GT-Four (ST205)		Group A
1995	Toyota Corona EXiV ST202		Super Touring
1995	Toyota Corrola AE101		Super Touring
1996	TOM's Toyota LMP		LMP900
1996	Toyota Camry SXV11		Super Touring
1996	Toyota Corrola AE110		Super Touring
1997	Toyota Corolla WRC		WRC
1998	Toyota Corrola Liftback EE111 5Door		Super Touring
1998	Toyota GT-One		Group GT1; LMGTP
1999	Toyota Chaser JZX100		Super Touring
2001	Toyota TF101		Formula One
2002	Toyota TF102		Formula One
2003	Toyota TF103		Formula One
2004	Toyota TF104		Formula One
2004	Toyota TF104B		Formula One
2004	Toyota Tundra		NASCAR Truck
2005	Toyota Celica		GT300
2005	Toyota MR-S		GT300
2005	Toyota Supra GT500		GT500
2005	Toyota TF105		Formula One
2005	Toyota TF105B		Formula One
2006	Toyota TF106		Formula One
2006	Toyota TF106B		Formula One
2007	Toyota Camry		NASCAR Gen 4
2007	Toyota Corolla S2000		Super 2000
2007	Toyota TF107		Formula One
2008	Toyota Camry		NASCAR CoT
2008	Toyota Land Cruiser VDJ200		Group T2
2008	Toyota TF108		Formula One
2009	Toyota Corolla Axio apr GT		GT300
2009	Toyota TF109		Formula One
2010	Toyota Camry		Xfinity Car of Tomorrow
2010	Toyota TF110		Formula One
2011	Toyota Avensis		Next Generation Touring Car
2012	Toyota Hilux Dakar		Group T1.1
2012	Toyota Land Cruiser KDJ155		Group T2
2012	Toyota Prius GT300		GT300
2012	Toyota TS030 Hybrid		LMP1
2012	Toyota Vitz		Group R1
2013	Toyota Camry		NASCAR Gen 6
2013	Toyota Hilux SRV		Group T2
2013	Toyota Hilux SW4 SUV		Group T2
2014	Toyota 86 MC		GT300
2014	Toyota TS040 Hybrid		LMP1
2016	Toyota Etios R5		Group R5
2016	Toyota TS050 Hybrid		LMP1-H
2017	Lexus RC F GT3		Group GT3
2017	Toyota Mark X MC		GT300
2017	Toyota Yaris WRC		WRC
2018	Toyota Hilux (AN120)		SuperUte
2019	Toyota Corolla GT		Next Generation Touring Car
2019	Toyota GR Supra		Xfinity Car of Tomorrow
2019	Toyota GR Supra GT4		SRO GT4
2020	Toyota GR Supra GT300		GT300
2020	Toyota GR Supra GT500		GT500
2021	Toyota GR010 Hybrid		LMH
2022	Toyota Camry		Turismo Carretera
2022	Toyota Camry TRD		Next Gen NASCAR
2022	Toyota GR86 GT300		GT300
2022	Toyota GR Corolla H2 Concept		ST-Q
2022	Toyota GR Corolla Sport TCR		TCR
2022	Toyota GR Supra		Funny Car
2022	Toyota GR Yaris Rally1		Group Rally1
2022	Toyota Land Cruiser GR Sport FJA300		Group T2
2023	Toyota GR86 Cup car		One Design
2024	Toyota Camry XV80		Next Gen NASCAR
2024	Toyota GR Yaris Rally2		Group Rally2
2025	Toyota Camry		TA2
2025	Toyota Corolla Cross		Stock Car Pro Series
2026	Toyota GR Corolla RC2		American Rally Association
2026	Toyota Supra Supercar		Supercars Gen 3
2026	Toyota TR010 Hybrid		LMH
2027	Toyota GR GT3		Group GT3
2027	Toyota GR Celica Rally1		Rally1
2027	Toyota GR Yaris Rally1		Rally1

== Records and statistics ==
=== Prominent rally victories ===
Year	Event	Driver/Co-driver	Car	Result
1973	Press On Regardless Rally (Detroit)	W. Boyce / D. Woods	Corolla (TE20)	1st
1975	1000 Lakes Rally	H. Mikkola / A. Aho	Corolla Levin (TE27)	1st
1979	National Gravel French Rally Championship	J.-L. Therier / M. Vial	Celica (RA20)	1st
1980	German Rally Championship	A. Warmbold / W. Inhester	Celica (RA40)	1st
	National Gravel French Rally Championship	J.-L. Therier / M. Vial	Celica (RA40)	1st
1982	Motogard Rally	B. Waldegård / H. Thorzelius	Celica 2000 GT (RA63)	1st
1983	Ivory Coast Rally	B. Waldegård / H. Thorzelius	Celica Twincam Turbo (TA64)	1st
1984	Safari Rally	B. Waldegård / H. Thorzelius	Celica Twincam Turbo (TA64)	1st
1985	Safari Rally	J. Kankkunen / F. Gallagher	Celica Twincam Turbo (TA64)	1st
	Ivory Coast Rally	J. Kankkunen / F. Gallagher	Celica Twincam Turbo (TA64)	1st
1986	Safari Rally	B. Waldegård / F. Gallagher	Celica Twincam Turbo (TA64)	1st
	Ivory Coast Rally	B. Waldegård / F. Gallagher	Celica Twincam Turbo (TA64)	1st
	Middle East Rally Championship	M. Bin Sulayem / R. Morgan	Celica Twincam Turbo (TA64)	1st
1987	Rally Hong Kong – Beijing	B. Waldegård / F. Gallagher	Supra 3.0i (MA70)	1st
	Middle East Rally Championship	M. Bin Sulayem / R. Morgan	Celica Twincam Turbo (TA64)	1st
1988	Safari Rally	K. Eriksson / P. Diekmann; J. Kankkunen / J. Piironen; B. Waldegård / F. Gallagher	Celica Supra Turbo (MA70)	Team Prize
	Cyprus Rally	B. Waldegård / F. Gallagher	Celica GT-Four (ST165)	1st
	Middle East Rally Championship	M. Bin Sulayem	Celica Twincam Turbo (TA64)	1st
1989	Rally Australia	J. Kankkunen / J. Piironen	Celica GT-Four (ST165)	1st
1990	Safari Rally	B. Waldegård / F. Gallagher	Celica GT-Four (ST165)	1st
	Acropolis Rally	C. Sainz / L. Moya	Celica GT-Four (ST165)	1st
	Rally New Zealand	C. Sainz / L. Moya	Celica GT-Four (ST165)	1st
	1000 Lakes Rally	C. Sainz / L. Moya	Celica GT-Four (ST165)	1st
	RAC Rally	C. Sainz / L. Moya	Celica GT-Four (ST165)	1st
	Middle East Rally Championship (Drivers)	M. Bin Sulayem / R. Morgan	Celica GT-Four (ST165)	1st
	Asian-Pacific Rally Championship (Drivers)	C. Sainz / L. Moya		1st
	World Championship of Drivers	C. Sainz / L. Moya	Celica GT-Four (ST165)	1st
	World Championship of Manufacturers			2nd
1991	Monte Carlo Rally	C. Sainz / L. Moya	Celica GT-Four (ST165)	1st
	Portugal Rally	C. Sainz / L. Moya	Celica GT-Four (ST165)	1st
	Corsica Rally	C. Sainz / L. Moya	Celica GT-Four (ST165)	1st
	Rally New Zealand	C. Sainz / L. Moya	Celica GT-Four (ST165)	1st
	Rally Argentina	C. Sainz / L. Moya	Celica GT-Four (ST165)	1st
	Rally Catalunya	A. Schwarz / A. Hertz	Celica GT-Four (ST165)	1st
	World Championship of Drivers	C. Sainz / L. Moya	Celica GT-Four (ST165)	2nd
	World Championship of Manufacturers			2nd
1992	Safari Rally	C. Sainz / L. Moya	Celica GT-Four (ST185)	1st
	Rally New Zealand	C. Sainz / L. Moya	Celica GT-Four (ST185)	1st
	Rally Catalunya	C. Sainz / L. Moya	Celica GT-Four (ST185)	1st
	RAC Rally	C. Sainz / L. Moya	Celica GT-Four (ST185)	1st
	World Championship of Drivers	C. Sainz / L. Moya	Celica GT-Four (ST185)	1st
	World Championship of Manufacturers			2nd
1993	Monte Carlo Rally	D. Auriol / B. Occelli	Celica GT-Four (ST185)	1st
	Swedish Rally	M. Jonsson / L. Backman	Celica GT-Four (ST185)	1st
	Safari Rally	J. Kankkunen / J. Piironen	Celica GT-Four (ST185)	1st
	Rally Argentina	J. Kankkunen / N. Grist	Celica GT-Four (ST185)	1st
	1000 Lakes Rally	J. Kankkunen / D. Giraudet	Celica GT-Four (ST185)	1st
	Rally Australia	J. Kankkunen / N. Grist	Celica GT-Four (ST185)	1st
	RAC Rally	J. Kankkunen / N. Grist	Celica GT-Four (ST185)	1st
	World Championship of Drivers	J. Kankkunen / N. Grist	Celica GT-Four (ST185)	1st
	World Championship of Manufacturers			1st
1994	Portugal Rally	J. Kankkunen / N. Grist	Celica GT-Four (ST185)	1st
	Safari Rally	Ian Duncan / David Williamson	Celica GT-Four (ST185)	1st
	Corsica Rally	D. Auriol / B. Occelli	Celica GT-Four (ST185)	1st
	Rally Argentina	D. Auriol / B. Occelli	Celica GT-Four (ST185)	1st
	Rallye Sanremo	D. Auriol / B. Occelli	Celica GT-Four (ST185)	1st
	World Championship of Drivers	D. Auriol / B. Occelli	Celica GT-Four (ST185)	1st
	World Championship of Manufacturers			1st
1995	Safari Rally (2-Litre Championship only)	Y. Fujimoto / A. Hertz	Celica GT-Four (ST185)	1st
	Tour de Corse	D. Auriol / D. Giraudet	Celica GT-Four (ST205)	1st
1996	European Rally Championship	A. Schwarz / D. Giraudet	Celica GT-Four (ST205)	1st
	RAC Rally (2-Litre Championship only)	A. Schwarz / D. Giraudet	Celica GT-Four (ST205)	1st
1998	Monte Carlo Rally	C. Sainz / L. Moya	Corolla WRC	1st
	Rallye Catalunya	D. Auriol / D. Giraudet	Corolla WRC	1st
	Rally New Zealand	C. Sainz / L. Moya	Corolla WRC	1st
	World Championship of Drivers	C. Sainz / L. Moya	Corolla WRC	2nd
	World Championship of Manufacturers			2nd
1999	China Rally	D. Auriol / D. Giraudet	Corolla WRC	1st
	World Championship of Drivers	D. Auriol / D. Giraudet	Corolla WRC	3rd
	World Championship of Manufacturers			1st

== See also ==
- Toyota Motorsport GmbH
- Toyota Racing Development
- Lexus § Motorsport
