= Toyota Racing =

Toyota Racing may refer to:

- Toyota Gazoo Racing
- Toyota Racing GmbH
- Toyota Racing (Formula One team)
- Toyota Racing Development
- Toyota Racing Series

== See also ==
- Toyota in motorsport
