= Group T3 =

FIA lightweight cross-country rally vehicle group

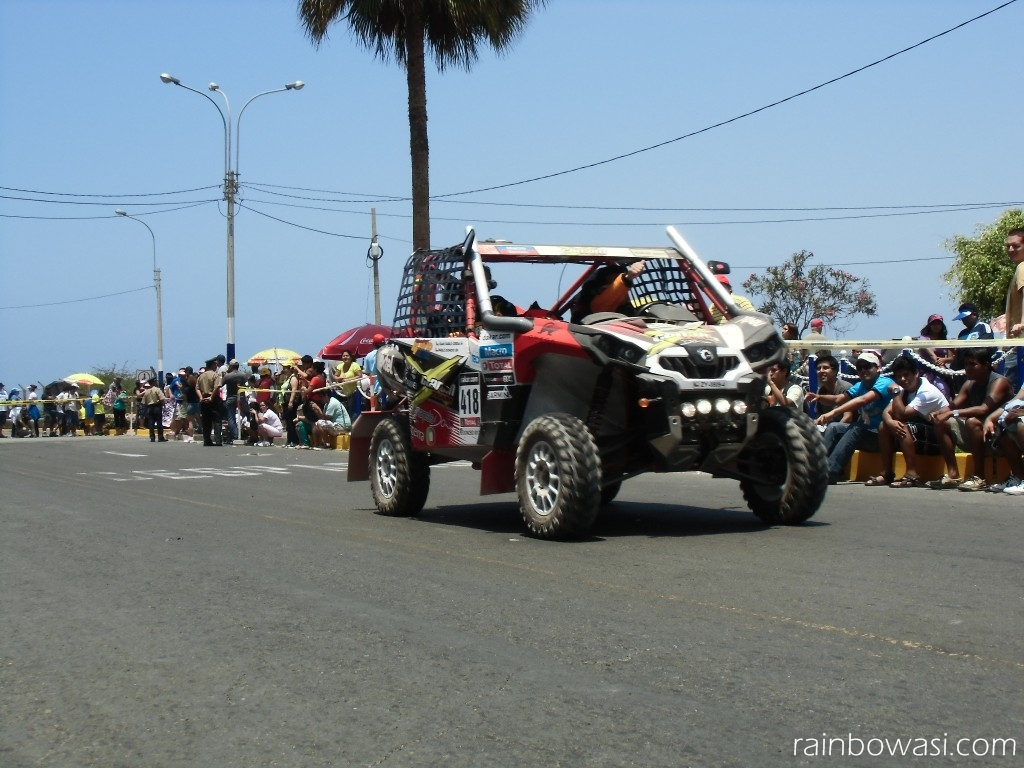
A Can-Am lightweight prototype cross-country vehicle

In relation to motorsport, Group T3 is a set of technical specifications for lightweight prototype cross-country vehicles used in off-road Cross-Country Rallying (also called Rally Raid). The group is governed by the Fédération Internationale de l'Automobile (FIA) and defined in appendix J, article 286 of its International Sporting Code. The vehicles are generally single unit builds for competition purposes, and differ from 'cars' defined in Group T1 by not needing to be road-legal (except for lighting), and have a much lower minimum weight. The T3 vehicles also do not need parts such as a windscreen or an engine manufactured by series production car companies. The vehicles must be powered by one engine and without driving aids such as traction control or ABS. Although not specifically defined as such by the FIA, the group may be called prototype side-by-side vehicles, like their series production relatives of Group T4. Indeed, T3 permits such modified and competition prepared vehicles where T4 prohibits them.

== History ==
Group T3 was first introduced in 1990 when the generic Group T, introduced the year before, was divided into four specific groups. Until 2002, T3 was for prototype cross-country competition cars, with no provision made by the FIA for the modern "lightweight vehicle". No Group T3 existed between 2003 and 2009, but improved cross-country cars were installed as T3 from 2010 until 2018.

In 2019, T3 became the category for lightweight vehicles with two categories; T3-Prototype and T3-Series which became the modern T3 and T4 respectively in 2020, with the Trucks of T4 being moved to Group T5.

Whether as cars or lightweight, T3 vehicles have been competing in Baja Cross Country Rallies, Rally Raids and Marathon Rallies, including in the FIA World Cup for Cross Country Rallies.

== Classes ==
When competing in the FIA World Rally-Raid Championship, which includes the long established Dakar Rally, there are no sporting classes within the group.

== Vehicles ==
Example T3 lightweight vehicles include:

- Can-Am Maverick X3
- G-Force T3GF
- PH-Sport Zephyr
- Red Bull OT3
- Taurus T3 Max
- Yamaha YXZ 1000R Rally Edition
- X-raid 1000R Turbo
- Arcane Rally

== See also ==
- Cross-Country Cars
  - Group T1 - prototype
  - Group T2 - series production
- Lightweight Cross-Country Vehicles
  - Group T3 - prototype
  - Group T4 - series production side-by-side vehicles
- Cross-Country Trucks
  - Group T5 - prototype and series production
