= Group T4 =

FIA lightweight cross-country rally vehicle group

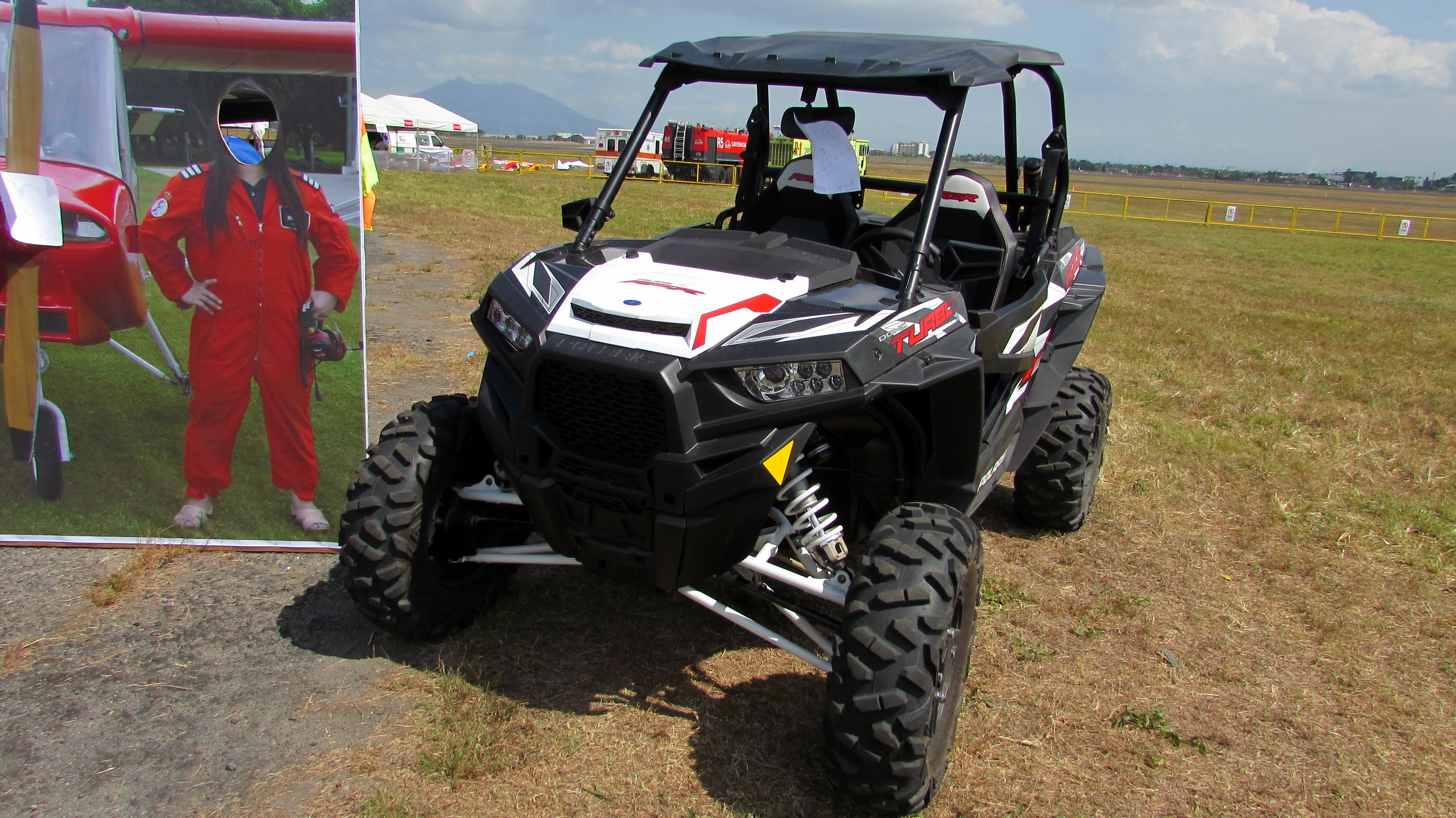
Unmodified Polaris RZR model

In relation to motorsport, Group T4 is a set of technical specifications for modified production cross-country side-by-side vehicles used in off-road Cross-Country Rallying (also called Rally Raid). The group is governed by the Fédération Internationale de l'Automobile (FIA) and defined in appendix J, article 286a of its International Sporting Code. The vehicles are modified for competition purposes from vehicles manufactured in numbers greater than 250 in a 12 month period. They must be road legal, but typically differ from the 'cars' defined in Group T1 and Group T2 by a much lower minimum weight (900 kg) and no requirement for parts such as a windscreen or windows. The vehicles must be powered by one engine and without driving aids such as traction control or ABS. Though the vehicles do not need to be homologated, a reference vehicle needs to be provided to the FIA for approval.

== History ==
Group T4 was first introduced in 1990 when the generic Group T, introduced the year before, was divided into four specific categories. At first, T4 was for cross-country trucks with no provision made for the modern "lightweight vehicle" until 2019 when two categories of Group T3 were established. In 2020, T3-Prototypes became Group T3, and T3-Series became the Group T4 of today, with Trucks moved to Group T5. The side-by-side T4 vehicles have been competing in FIA Baja Cross Country Rallies, Rally Raids and Marathon Rallies since then, including in the FIA World Cup for Cross Country Rallies.

== Classes ==
When competing in the FIA World Rally-Raid Championship there are no sporting classes within the group. However, the long-established Dakar Rally introduced these for the 2025 event with SSV1, SSV2, and T4. Vehicles complying with the 2021 ASO regulations are eligible, although the 2022 ASO regulations refer to the FIA regulations signifying the FIA's authority.

T4 vehicle are also eligible to compete in the FIA African Rally Championship and Middle East Rally Championship rallies in a class of their own. No other Group T cross-country vehicles are allowed.

== Vehicles ==
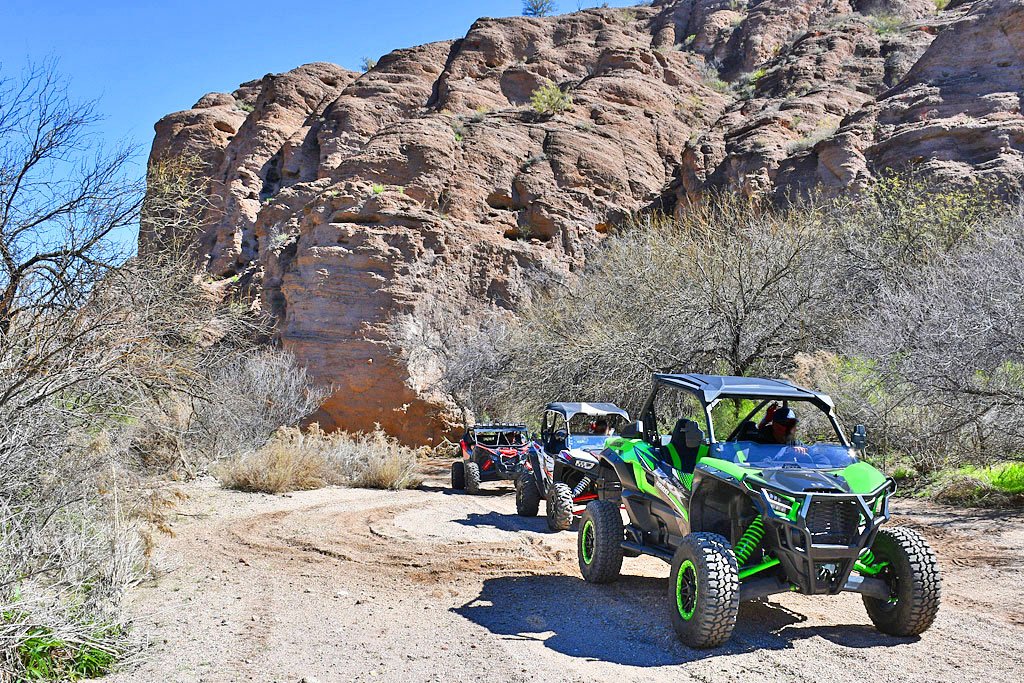
Side by sides in San Manuel, Arizona.

Group T4 vehicles approved by the FIA as of June 2021 include:

- BRP Can Am Maverick XRS Turbo R
- BRP Can Am Maverick XRS Turbo RR
- Polaris RZR 64 PRO XP Turbo Dynamix
- Polaris RZR 64 PRO XP Turbo Premium
- Yamaha YXZ1000R Sport Shift (SS)

== See also ==
- Cross-Country Cars
  - Group T1 - prototype
  - Group T2 - series production
- Lightweight Cross-Country Vehicles
  - Group T3 - prototype
  - Group T4 - series production side-by-side vehicles
- Cross-Country Trucks
  - Group T5 - prototype and series production
