= International Sporting Code =

Ruleset for FIA motorsports

The International Sporting Code (ISC) is a set of rules applicable to all four-wheel motorsport as governed by the Fédération Internationale de l'Automobile (FIA). It was first implemented in 1926.

The ISC consists of 20 articles and several appendices. It contains definitions, general principles, and regulations, as well as rules for race organisers, contenders, racers, and officials. As motorsport is very hierarchic, the ISC may also be applicable in the rules of national racing federations.

Some North American domestic racing, such as NASCAR and IndyCar are outside the FIA's jurisdiction and hence not governed by the ISC and they instead usually govern their own series themselves. Motorcycle sport is also exempt since the Fédération Internationale de Motocyclisme (FIM) is responsible for this sport, not the FIA.

== Summary ==
The ISC consists of 20 articles. In the first, it is determined that the FIA is the sole international sporting authority entitled to make and enforce regulations regarding automobile competitions. It is further determined that the ISC is a regulation to encourage and facilitate international motor sport. Each national sporting authority (ASN) or federation affiliated with the FIA is allowed to draw up their own rules. The ISC will not be enforced, as long as competition is safe and fair.

With regard to records the ISC differentiates between international records and local records. Local records established on a permanent or temporary track fall within the scope of the national federation of that country. Appendix D applies to international records.

=== Kinds of racing ===
Article 20 contains definitions of common motorsport terms, including the following on what kind of motor sport competitions exist:

- Circuit race

A competition held on a closed circuit between two or more vehicles, running at the same time on the same course, in which speed or the distance covered in a given time is the determining factor.

- Drag race

An acceleration contest between two vehicles racing from a standing start over a straight, precisely measured course in which the first vehicle to cross the finish line (without penalty) achieves the better performance

- Drifting

A Competition in which Drivers compete by aiming to accurately follow a pre-determined Course. Scoring will be done by Judges, based on a combination of line, angle, style and speed.

- Hill Climb

An event in which each vehicle takes the start individually to cover the same course ending with a finish line situated at a higher altitude than the start line. The time taken to cover the distance between the start and finish lines is the determining factor for establishing the classifications.

- Rally

Road event with an imposed average speed, which is run entirely or partly on roads open to normal traffic. A rally consists either of a single itinerary which must be followed by all cars, or of several itineraries converging on a same rallying-point fixed beforehand and followed or not by a common itinerary.

- Cross-Country Rally

Competition with a total distance between 1200 km and 3000 km. The length of each selective section must be no more than 500 km.

- Baja Cross-Country Rally

Cross-Country Rally which must be run over one day (maximum distance to be covered: 600 km) or two days (maximum distance to be covered: 1000 km), with a rest halt of a minimum of 8 hours and a maximum of 20 hours to be observed between the two legs). The minimum aggregate distance of the selective sections is 300 km. No selective section may exceed 800 km.

- Marathon Cross-Country Rallies

The total course must be at least 5,000 km and the distance of the selective sections must be at least 3000 km.

- Record Attempts

Attempt to break a National Record, World Record, Absolute World Record, or Outright World Record, in accordance with the Code.

- Tests

Authorised Competition in which each Competitor may select his own time for carrying it out within a period determined by the regulations.

- Trials

Competition comprising a number of tests of distance or skill.

- Slalom

Also called Gymkhana, Motorkhana or similar meanings: Competition held on closed Course, where one Automobile at a time runs through pre-established obstacles and where ability and the time achieved are the determining factors.

=== Further regulations ===
The ISC further regulates what kind of officials exist, penalties when a breach of rules appears and how to protest and appeal.

== History ==
On October 15, 2013 FIA has published the new International Sporting Code, application from 1 January 2014. The new Code was aiming to achieve two key goals: (i) to revise the structure of the ISC and the definition of the concepts of Championship, Cup, Series, Challenge, Event, etc., and (ii) to clarify and improve the distribution of the areas of responsibility between the FIA and the National Sporting Authorities (ASNs). The notable difference is that new Code had only 20 articles and 76 pages, while previous edition, adopted on November 11, 2005, had 17 chapters, 212 articles and 24 pages.

== Notable appendices ==
=== Appendix D ===
Appendix D of the ISC further regulates attempts at land speed records. In accordance to the appendix, world records can be attempted in one of four categories:

- Category A: special automobiles built for land speed record attempts
- Category B: series production automobiles (like the Bugatti Veyron)
- Category C: special vehicles with any kind of engine and the use of aerodynamic aid is allowed (like the ThrustSSC)
- Category D: cars which comply with the FIA regulations for dragracing automobiles

Categories are subdivided into fifteen groups and further classes based on fuel source, engine type, cylinder capacity and/or vehicle weight. Examples from Category A include the Group VII solar powered UNSW Sunswift and the Group XI Hybrid powered Buckeye Bullet.

The appendix also includes regulations surrounding officiating, taking measurements, safety procedures and different types of records, such as acceleration records, distance records, whether flying or standing start etc.

=== Appendix J ===
Appendix J was introduced by the FIA in 1954, initially for Touring Cars and GT Cars. It regulates what kind of cars can compete, arranged by vehicle type, sporting class and specifications. Currently, Appendix J features three categories classifying various groups of cars, cross country vehicles and trucks.

- Category I: Series production cars
  - Group N: Production cars
  - Group A: Touring cars
  - Group R/Groups Rally 2–5: Touring cars or large scale series production cars
  - Group E-I: Free formula racing cars
  - Group T2: Series Production Cross-Country Cars
- Category II: Competition cars
  - Group RGT: GT production cars
  - Group Rally1
  - Group GT3: Cup Grand Touring cars
  - Group CN: Production sports cars
  - Group E-II: Free formula racing cars
  - Group T1: Modified Cross-Country Cars
  - Group T3: Improved Lightweight Prototype Cross-Country Vehicles
  - Group T4: Improved Lightweight Series Cross-Country Side by Side Vehicles
- Category III: Trucks
  - Group F: Racing trucks
  - Group T5: Cross-Country Trucks
