= Kawasaki MULE =

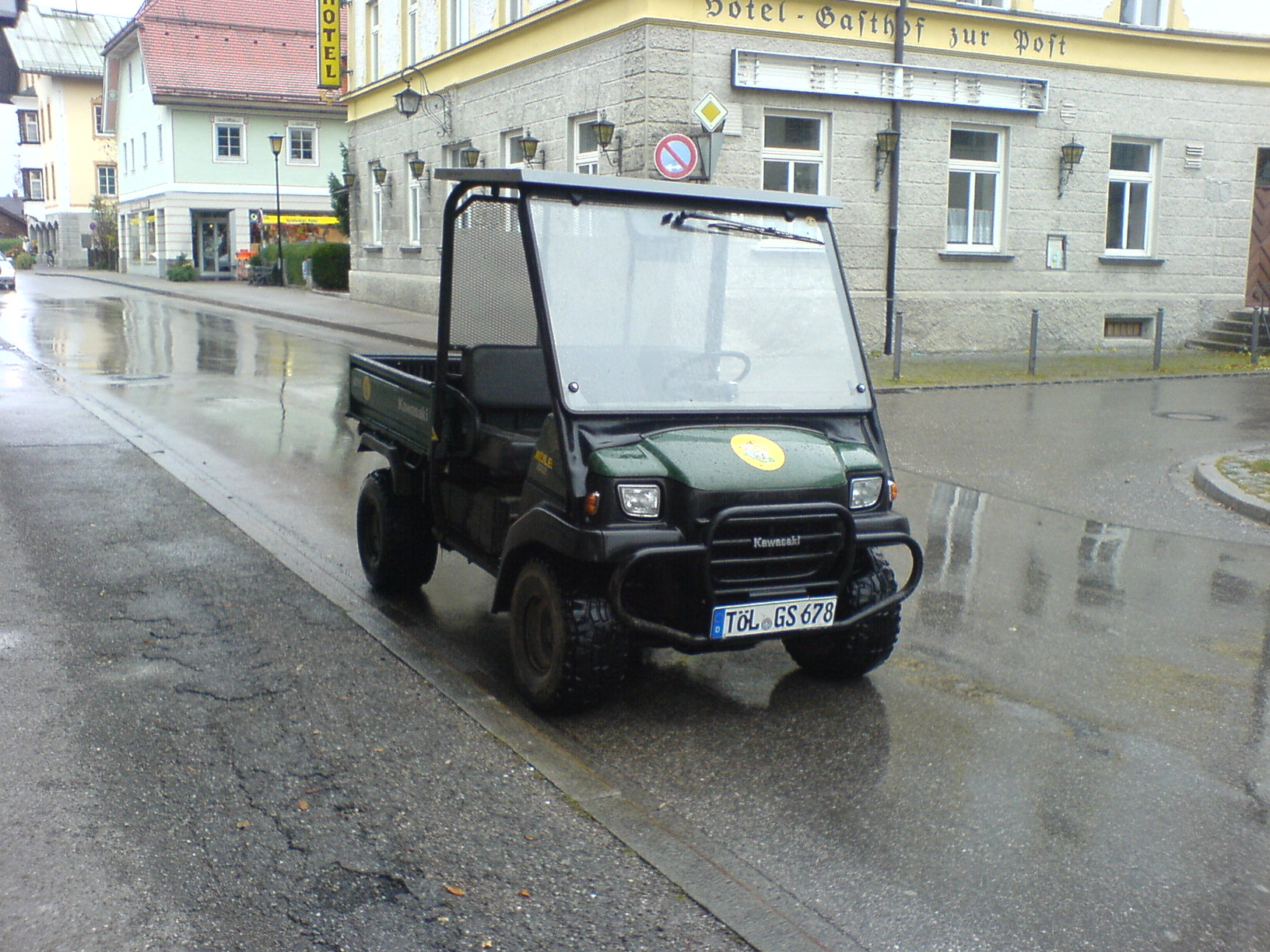
- Kawasaki MULE 3010 Diesel

Overview
- Manufacturer: Kawasaki Heavy Industries Motorcycle & Engine
- Production: 1988–present

Body and chassis
- Class: UTV
- Body style: Open cab utility vehicle

Powertrain
- Transmission: Continuously variable transmission

The Kawasaki MULE (Multi-Use Light Equipment) is a series of lightweight Utility Task Vehicle that have been built by Kawasaki since 1988. Initially available with a 454 cc (27.70 cu in) twin-cylinder engine in the original MULE 1000 model, the range has grown and been gradually updated over the years, and now includes both petrol and diesel variants.

== History ==
In 1988, the first Kawasaki MULE was introduced in the form of the MULE 1000; it featured a water-cooled 454 cc (27.70 cu in) twin-cylinder engine, which was fitted to an open-cab utility vehicle chassis. The MULE 1000 also featured a continuously variable transmission (CVT), independent suspension at the front and rear and a locking rear differential.

The MULE 2010 was introduced in 1989, and featured a larger 535 cc (32.65 cu in) engine, a high/low CVT transmission, selectable four-wheel-drive and a De Dion rear suspension. 1990 saw the introduction of three new MULEs; the 2020, which was designed for golf courses and used a fan-cooled single-cylinder engine, the 2030, which was designed for industrial work, and the compact 500 model with a single seat.

MULE 2500

The MULE 2500 series was introduced in 1992 and featured a new 617 cc (37.65 cu in) V-twin engine with a fan cooled CVT. The 2500 series also featured four wheel self-adjusting hydraulic brakes and introduced a high mounted air intake system for the engine and transmission that drew air through the rear cab frame tubes. The two-seat compact model 550 followed in 1996 and a turf version of that model, known as the 520, followed in 1999. The first diesel MULE with a 953 cc (58.2 cu in) three-cylinder engine was introduced in 1999 as part of the 2500 series.

MULE 3000

The MULE 3000 series arrived the following year, combining the 2500 series' V-twin petrol engines with a new continuously variable transmission and featuring new "pick-up truck" styling incorporating a storage compartment under the hood; a diesel version followed in 2003. 2005 saw the introduction of a four-seat version of the 3000 series and the compact 600 series, which featured an upgraded suspension, a 401 cc (24.47 cu in) engine, and new "high volume" bodywork similar to the 3000 series.

In 2009, the 4000 series followed, with both petrol and diesel versions being available. In 2014, the new MULE PRO-FXT was introduced, featuring a fuel-injected 812 cc (49.55 cu in) straight-three engine, a CVT transmission, and a cab that could seat up to six people.
