= Group T2 =

FIA cross-country rally car group

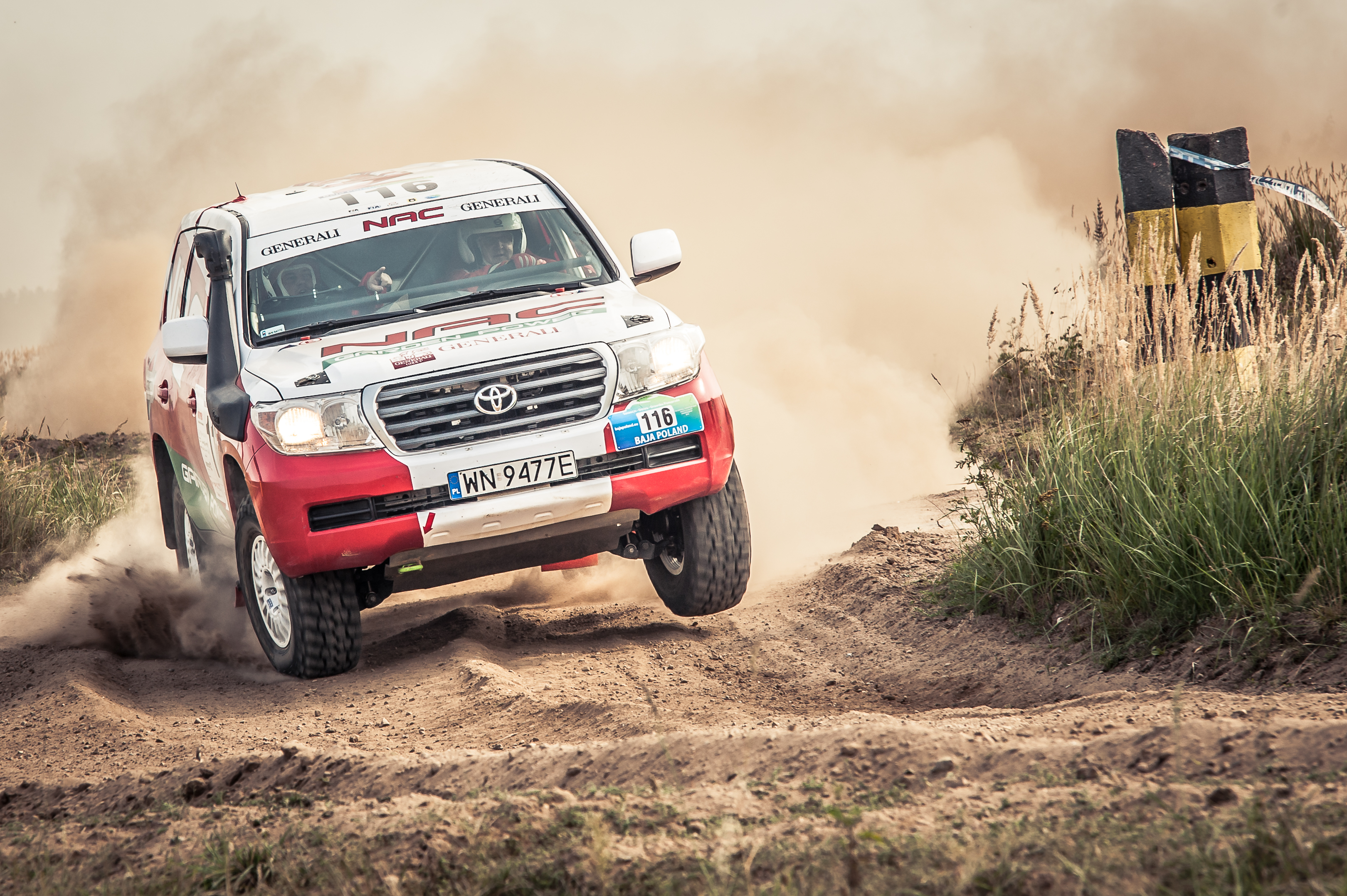
Group T2 Toyota Land Cruiser VDJ200

In relation to motorsport, Group T2 is a set of technical specifications for series production cross-country cars used in off-road Cross-Country Rallying (also called Rally Raid). The group is governed by the Fédération Internationale de l'Automobile (FIA) and defined in appendix J, article 284 of its International Sporting Code. The cars must use a bodyshell and apart from safety features such as a roll cage and upgraded suspension and wheels, must retain features of the series production car unlike the thoroughbred race prototypes in Group T1, which have more freedom surrounding the chassis build and other parts. The cars in T2 must be homologated with a series production build requirement of 1000 identical units.

== History ==
Group T2 was first introduced in 1990 when the generic Group T, introduced the year before, was divided into four specific categories. Until 2002, FIA's T2 was for improved series production cross-country cars, with Group T1 being reserved for normal series production cars. In 2003 for one year only, T2 became modified cross-country cars with no production requirement and being placed in Category II for competition cars. However the following year they were moved back to Category I production cars, essentially swapping to the modern arrangement, with T1 for modified competition cars and T2 for series production cars.. These cars have been competing in Baja Cross Country Rallies, Rally Raids and Marathon Rallies since their inception, including in the FIA World Cup for Cross Country Rallies.

== Classes ==
There are no additional classes when competing in the FIA World Rally-Raid Championship, which includes the long established Dakar Rally in its inaugural season. Prior, T2 cars complying with the Dakar Rally's organiser ASO's rules were permitted in FIA events and cups.

== Cars ==
Homologated cars as of 2023 include:

Manufacturer	Model	Capacity	Début	End	Image
(Japan) Isuzu	D-Max TFS-85	2999.3cc	2005	2026	
(Japan) Isuzu	D-Max TFS-85H	2999.3cc	2007	2026	
(Japan) Isuzu	D-Max TFS-85	2999.3cc	2013	2027	
(Japan) Isuzu	MU-X UCS85	2999.3cc	2015	2027	
(Japan) Nissan	Navara Double Cab D40	2488.5cc	2007	2026	
(Japan) Nissan	Pathfinder R51	2488.5cc	2008	2026	
(Japan) Nissan	Patrol Y62	5569.6cc	2014	2026	
(Japan) Mitsubishi	Pajero Turbo Diesel V88W	3200.5cc	2007	2026	
(Japan) Toyota	Land Cruiser VDJ200	4461.2cc	2008	2026	
(Japan) Toyota	Land Cruiser KDJ155	2991.3cc	2011	2026	
(Japan) Toyota	Land Cruiser GR Sport FJA300	3353.7	2022	2029	
(Argentina) Toyota	Hilux SRV	2982.2cc	2013	2026	
(Argentina) Toyota	Hilux SW4 SUV	2982.2cc	2013	2026	
(Germany) Volkswagen	Race Touareg		2003	2011	

== See also ==
- Cross-Country Cars
  - Group T1 - prototype
  - Group T2 - series production
- Lightweight Cross-Country Vehicles
  - Group T3 - prototype
  - Group T4 - series production side-by-side vehicles
- Cross-Country Trucks
  - Group T5 - prototype and series production
