= Side-by-side (vehicle) =

Type of off-road vehicle

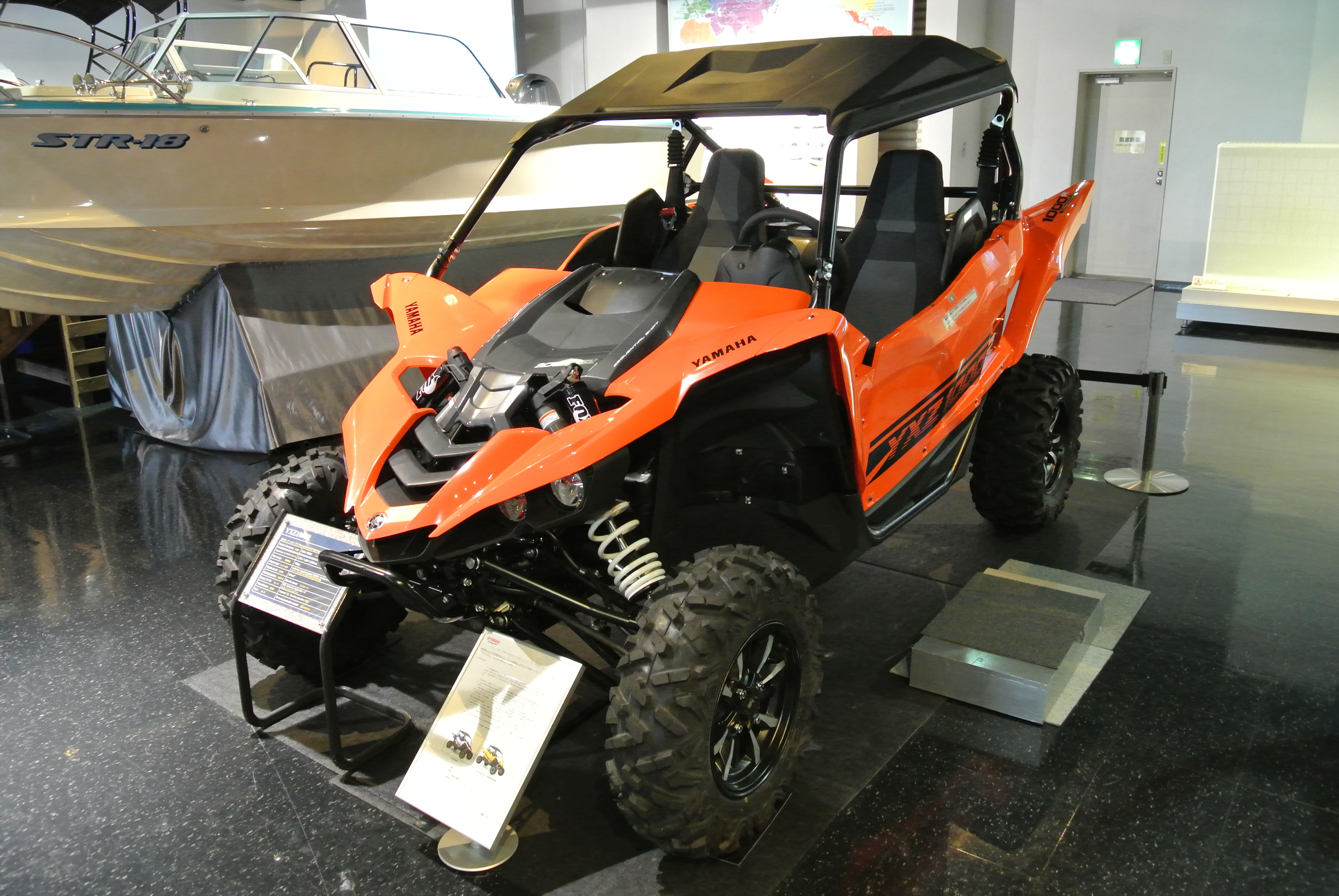
A Yamaha YXZ1000R side-by-side

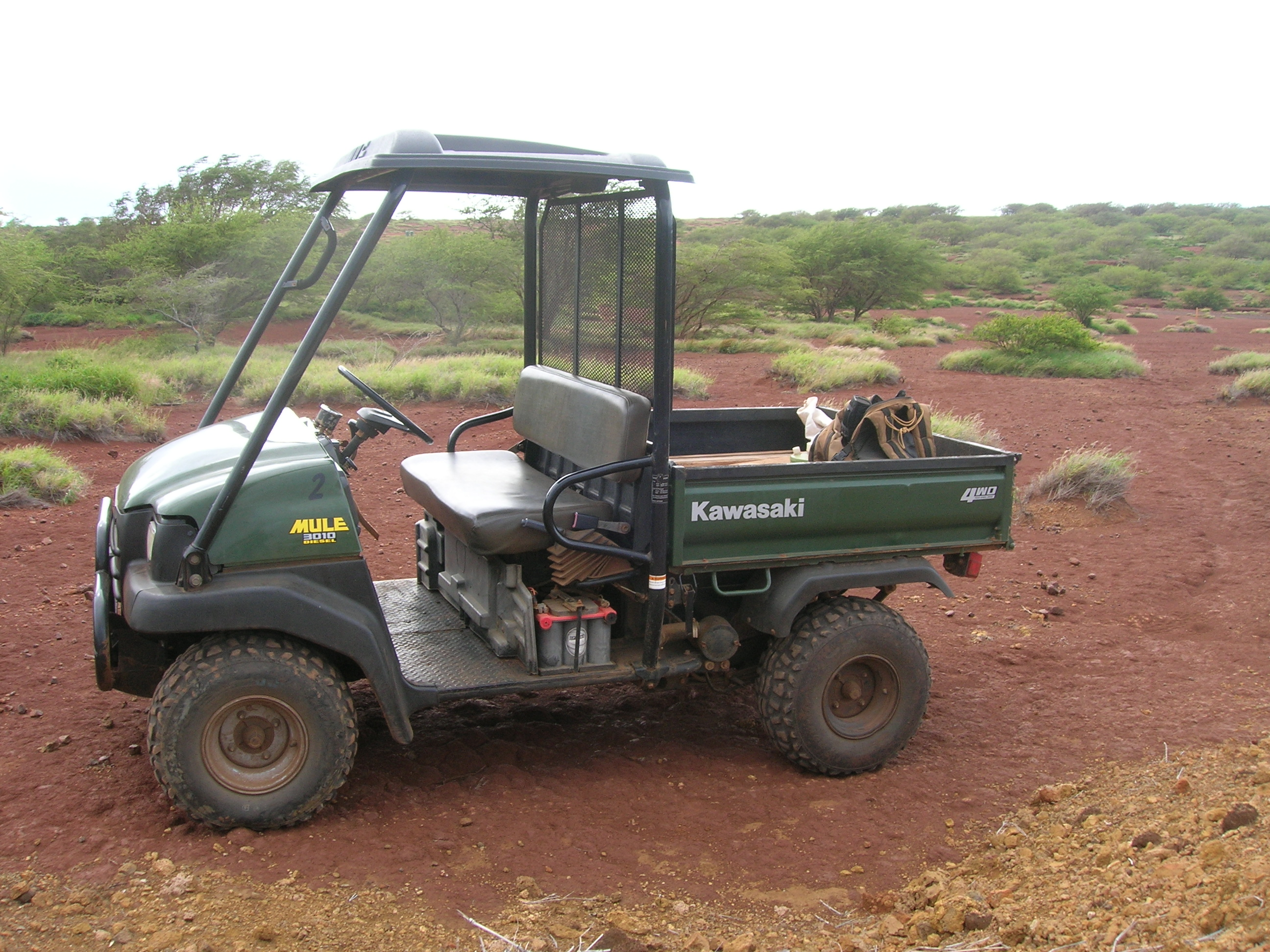
Kawasaki MULE

A side-by-side vehicle (SxS or SSV), is a utility vehicle with a minimum of two seats positioned side by side and enclosed within a roll cage structure. They have a minimum of four wheels (or continuous tracks) and are operated by foot controls and a steering wheel. Depending on use and application they can also be called a utility task vehicle, utility terrain vehicle (UTV), recreational off-highway vehicle (ROV), or multipurpose off-highway utility vehicle (MOHUV).

Side-by-sides may be included in the category of all-terrain vehicles (ATVs), but do not include vehicles with saddle-seats that are operated using handlebar-type controls that are the conventional meaning of that term.

== Definition and standards ==
The American National Standards Institute (ANSI) publishes two standards for side-by-sides. ANSI/OPEI B71.9-2016 sets standards for multipurpose off-highway utility vehicles (MOHUV) specifically intended for utility use which are intended to transport persons and cargo, have a non-straddle seat, are designed to travel on four or more wheels, use a steering wheel and pedals for controls, have a top speed of at least 25 mph (40.2 km/h), are 2030 mm (80 in) or less in overall width, have a gross vehicle weight rating (GVWR) of no more than 1814 kg (4000 lb), and with a minimum cargo capacity of 159 kg (350 lb). ANSI/ROHVA 1-2016 sets standards for recreational off-highway vehicles as having speed capability greater than 30 MPH (48 km/h), GVWR no greater than 1700 kg (3750 lbs), and engine displacement equal to or less than 1,000 cc (61 cubic inches) for gasoline fueled engines.

== Safety ==
In 2009, the U.S. Consumer Product Safety Commission (CPSC) warned, "The vehicles may exhibit inadequate lateral stability, undesirable steering characteristics, and inadequate occupant protection during a rollover crash." According to the CPSC, between 2003 and August 2009, 116 deaths occurred in ROV/UTV accidents in the U.S.

== Use and application ==
=== Motorsports ===
Since the 2017 Dakar Rally, the SSV category vehicles have competed in a separate class, which is defined as four-wheel side-by-side vehicles with 1000 cc maximum displacement. Previously, they were classified in the Cars T3.3 subclass. In 2021 Dakar Rally organizers and the FIA introduced common categories - Group T3 for light prototypes and Group T4 for production based side by side vehicles. The trucks were reclassified to Group T5.

Other off-road racing series include side-by-side classes, such as the Lucas Oil Off Road Racing Series, TORC: The Off-Road Championship, SCORE International, Best in the Desert, and Grand National Cross Country.

=== In combat ===
Ukrainian forces have used UTVs during the 2022 Russian invasion of Ukraine, using a crew of two, fitted with Stugna-P missiles, some with machine guns, to destroy Russian tanks and positions. They have been referred to as "Mad Max" buggies. The US Marines are amongst other military forces to utilise forms of side-by-sides such as Polaris RZR.

=== Road and street use ===
Side-by-sides are allowed to be street legal in various U.S states, however the vehicle requirements and the types of road allowed for use vary.

== See also ==
- Electric rickshaw
- Microvan
- Neighborhood Electric Vehicle (NEV)
- Squad Solar—Solar electric side-by-side
