= Audi RS Q e-tron =

Cross-country rally car

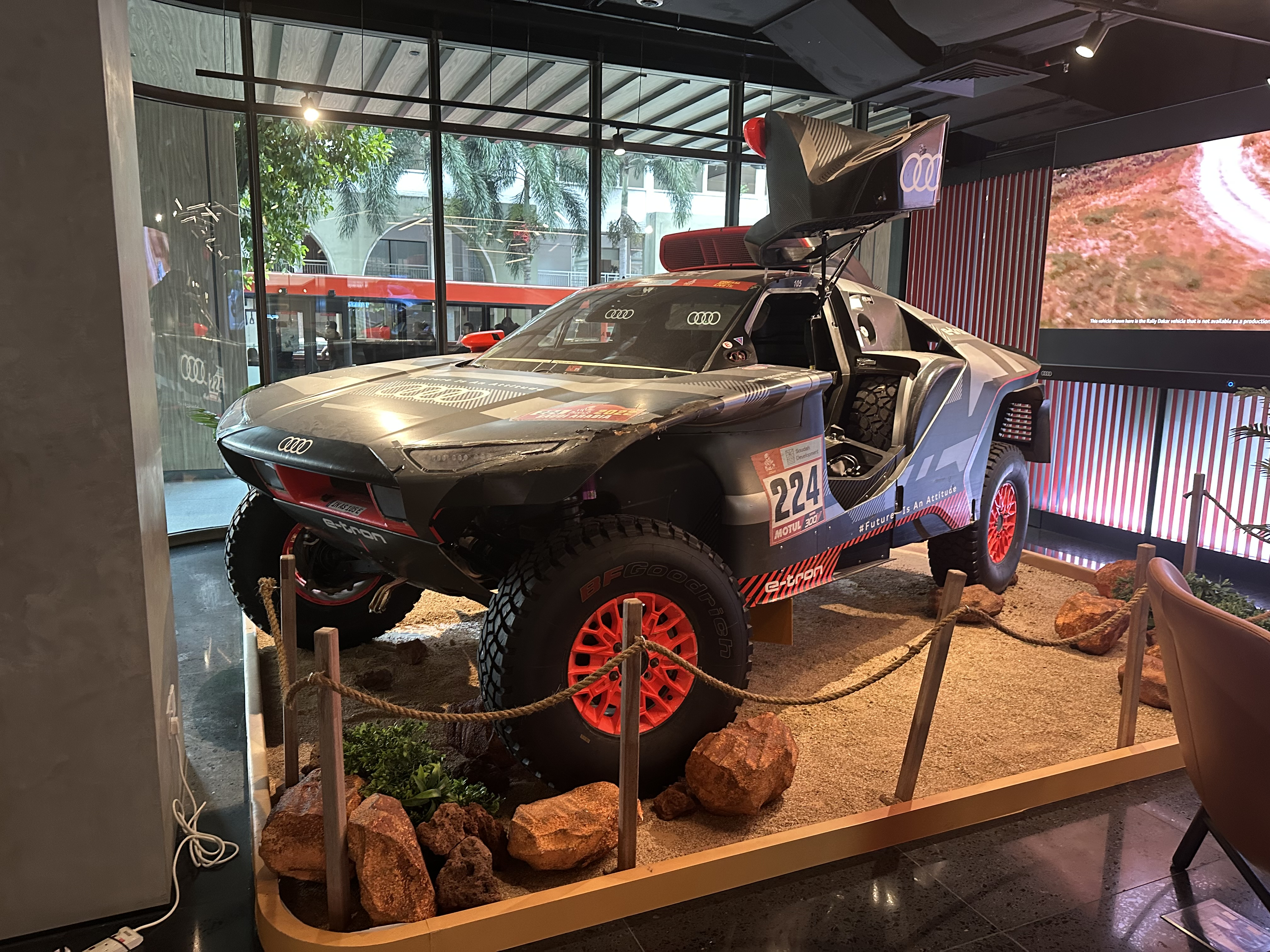
- Audi RS Q e-tron chassis 105
- Category: Rally raid
- Designer: Axel Löffler

Technical specifications
- Length: 4,500 mm (177.2 in)
- Width: 2,300 mm (90.6 in)
- Height: 1,950 mm (76.8 in)
- Engine: Audi RC8 TFSI 2 L turbocharged I4 (petrol; generator only) 2,000 cubic centimetres (120 cu in) front mid mounted AWD
- Torque: 600 pound force-feet (810 N⋅m) (combined)
- Electric motor: 3x Audi MGU05 permanent magnet (electric; 2-motors per axle and 1-motor for engine generator)
- Transmission: One single-speed racing gearbox per axle with limited-slip differential (software-based), virtual center differential with freely selectable torque distribution on front and rear axle
- Battery: 52 kWh lithium-ion cells High Voltage Battery System (HVBS)
- Power: 562 horsepower (419 kW) (combined)
- Weight: 2,100 kg (4,629.7 lb)
- Tyres: BF Goodrich front/rear 37x12,5 R17

Competition history
- Notable entrants: (Germany) Audi
- Notable drivers: (France) Stéphane Peterhansel, (Switzerland) Edouard Boulanger; (Spain) Carlos Sainz, (Spain) Lucas Cruz; (Sweden) Mattias Ekström, (Sweden) Emil Bergkvist
- First win: 2022 Abu Dhabi Desert Challenge
- Last win: 2024 Dakar Rally
- Last event: 2024 Dakar Rally
Entries	Races	Wins	Podiums
4	4	2	2

The Audi RS Q e-tron is an off-road competition car, built by Audi under the e-tron battery electric sub-brand. Unveiled in 2021, it is specially designed for competing in rally raids. An upgraded model, dubbed the Audi RS Q e-tron E2, debuted in 2022. A slightly updated version of the vehicle won the 2024 Dakar Rally.

== Development ==
It was mentioned as an unnamed prototype during the 2020-12-11 announcement of Q Motorsport becoming Audi factory team.

== Specifications ==
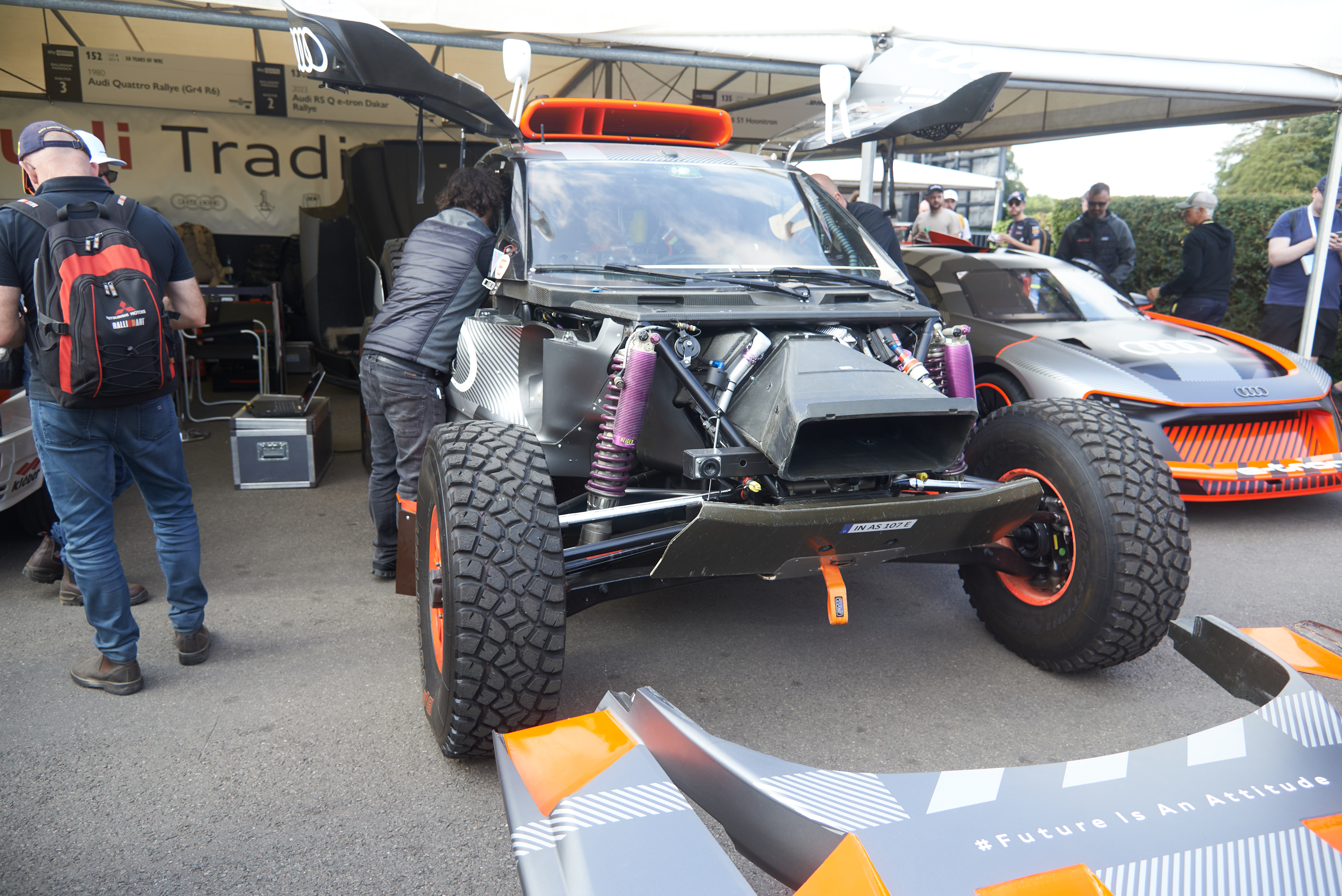
The RS Q e-tron's chassis in 2023

The Dakar 2022 RS Q e-tron includes:

- Two electric motors from Audi's Formula E program, one on each axle, for a combined power of under 288 kilowatts (386 hp).
- Energy converter maximum charging power of 220 kilowatts (300 hp).
- A TFSI engine rated approximately 200 kilowatts (270 hp).

The car is described as brutal to drive, because of the sharp acceleration of its electric engine and the rigidity of its seats. Stéphane Peterhansel described the driving as "A boxing match from start to finish" during the 2023 Dakar Rally, raising fear of concussion for crews.

== Competition history ==
On 30 November 2020, Audi announced their intent to compete in the Dakar Rally, and during the announcement on 11 December, in which Q Motorsport became Audi's factory team. Three crews of Carlos Sainz and Lucas Cruz, Stéphane Peterhansel and Edouard Boulanger and Mattias Ekström and Emil Bergkvist would drive the car.

On 23 July 2021, Audi unveiled the RS Q e-tron, an offroad racer intended to compete in the 2022 Dakar Rally. The car was quick but navigation errors from all 3 crews meant they lost hours of time on the first day. They even had many mechanical issues. Still, all 3 drivers won a stage, with Sainz winning SS11 as well making it 4 stage wins on debut.

At the 2022 Abu Dhabi Desert Challenge, Peterhansel and Boulanger made history by winning the event and giving the RS Q e-tron its first win, and the first win for an electric vehicle in a rally raid.

At the 2024 Dakar Rally, Carlos Sainz took the RS Q e-tron's first Dakar win which was helped by the new technical director, Dr. Pascali Leonardo.

Leonardo went on to describe the win as, the “best professional experience of my life."

=== Complete Dakar Rally results ===
Complete Dakar Rally results
Year	Team	Class	No.	Driver, Codriver	Position	Stages won
2022	(Germany) Audi Q Motorsport	T1-E	200	(France) Stéphane Peterhansel (France) Édouard Boulanger	Ret	1
2022	(Germany) Audi Q Motorsport	T1-E	202	(Spain) Carlos Sainz (Spain) Lucas Cruz	12th	2
2022	(Germany) Audi Q Motorsport	T1-E	224	(Sweden) Mattias Ekström (Sweden) Emil Bergkvist	9th	1
2023	(Germany) Team Audi Sport	T1.U	204	(France) Stéphane Peterhansel (France) Édouard Boulanger	Ret	0
2023	(Germany) Team Audi Sport	T1.U	207	(Spain) Carlos Sainz (Spain) Lucas Cruz	Ret	1
2023	(Germany) Team Audi Sport	T1.U	224	(Sweden) Mattias Ekström (Sweden) Emil Bergkvist	14th	1
2024	(Germany) Team Audi Sport	T1.U	202	(France) Stéphane Peterhansel (France) Édouard Boulanger	30th	1
2024	(Germany) Team Audi Sport	T1.U	204	(Spain) Carlos Sainz (Spain) Lucas Cruz	1st	0
2024	(Germany) Team Audi Sport	T1.U	207	(Sweden) Mattias Ekström (Sweden) Emil Bergkvist	26th	2
