= Volkswagen Tarek =

Off-road competition car

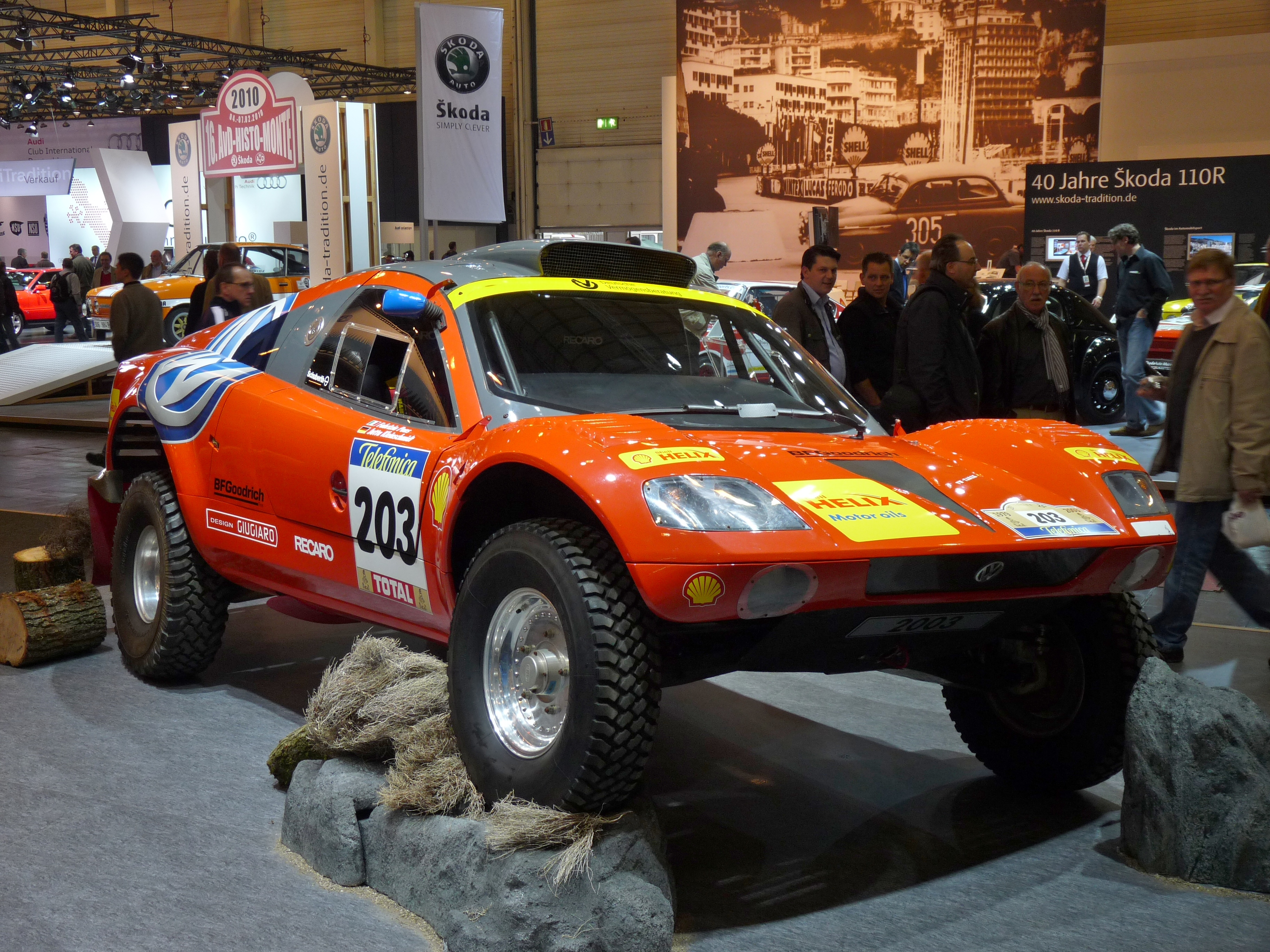

Overview
- Manufacturer: Volkswagen
- Production: 2003

Body and chassis
- Class: Rally raid
- Layout: rear wheel drive

The Volkswagen Tarek is an off-road competition car produced by Volkswagen in 2003.

== Technical specifications ==
The engine used in the car was a 218 HP 1.9 turbodiesel with 390 N m of torque. It was equipped with injector-pump direct injection and variable geometry turbine. The frame is tubular in steel and is covered with a carbon fiber body. The suspensions are double triangles on each side with coil springs and adjustable shock absorbers, while the installed rims are 16 'at the front and 15' at the rear. The gearbox that transmits the power to the traction is rear and five-speed manual. The tank is 250 liters.

== Competition history ==
The Tarek, presented at the Essen Motor Show, was conceived to participate in the 2003 Dakar Rally. The drivers chosen were Jutta Kleinschmidt, Stéphane Henrard and Dieter Depping. At the end of the competition Henrard came in 6th place, while Kleinschmidt came in 8th.
