= Utility vehicle =

Multi-role vehicle more specialized than a general-purpose vehicle

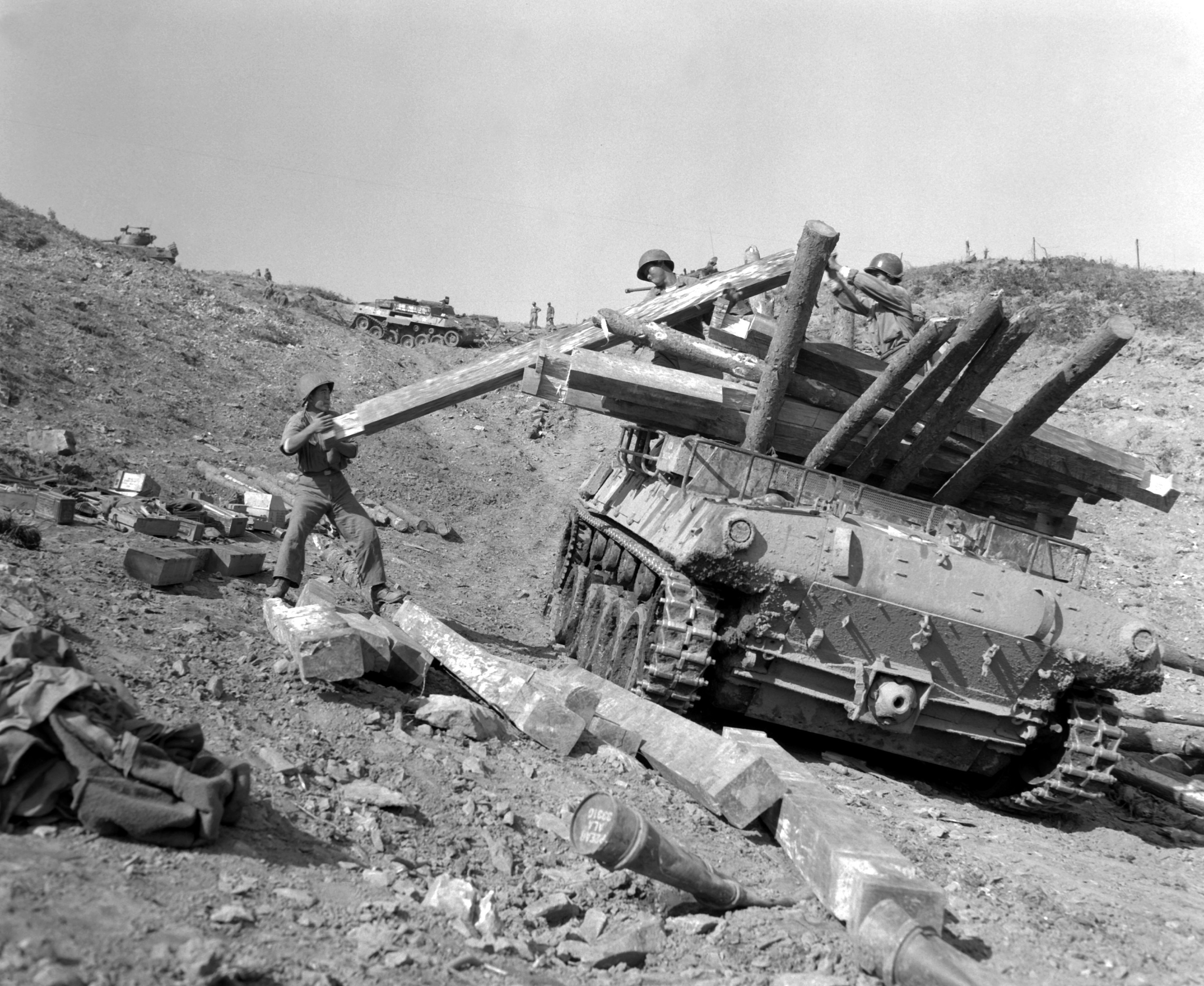
An armored utility vehicle used in war

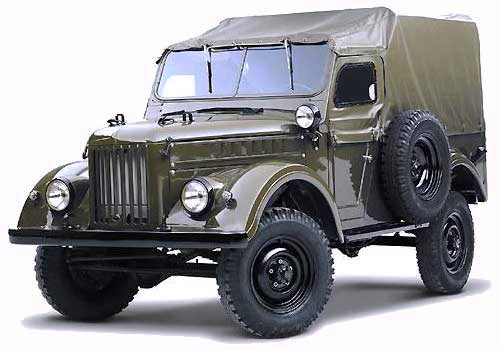
A Soviet GAZ-69, a military light utility vehicle

A utility vehicle (UV) is a vehicle, generally motorized, that is designed to carry out a specific task with more efficacy than a passenger vehicle. It sometimes refers to a small truck with low sides.

== Types of utility vehicles ==
=== Military light utility vehicle ===
Military light utility vehicle, or simply light utility vehicle (LUV), is a term used for the lightest weight class military vehicle category. A Jeep-like four-wheel drive vehicle for military use by definition lighter than other military trucks and vehicles, inherently compact and usually with light or no armour, with short body overhangs for nimble all-terrain mobility, and frequently around 4-passenger capacity.

=== Armored utility vehicle ===
The military also uses armored utility vehicles.

=== Multi-utility vehicle ===
These are larger vehicles which can tackle a wide range of applications. They typically allow easy conversion between multiple combinations of passenger and luggage capacity.

=== Sport utility vehicle (SUV) ===
Traditionally, these are vehicles similar to a station wagon but built on a light-truck chassis and equipped with four-wheel drive or all-wheel drive, amongst other off-road hardware. Their primary purpose is to display better off-road and towing capabilities with higher seating capacity.

=== Crossover utility vehicle ===
Station wagons based on a car chassis, but built to resemble sport utility vehicles. They have a limited off-road capability but sportier on-road behavior than SUVs. May also be referred to as a "Sports Activity Vehicle", as is the case with BMW's X-range of vehicles.

=== Light equipment ===
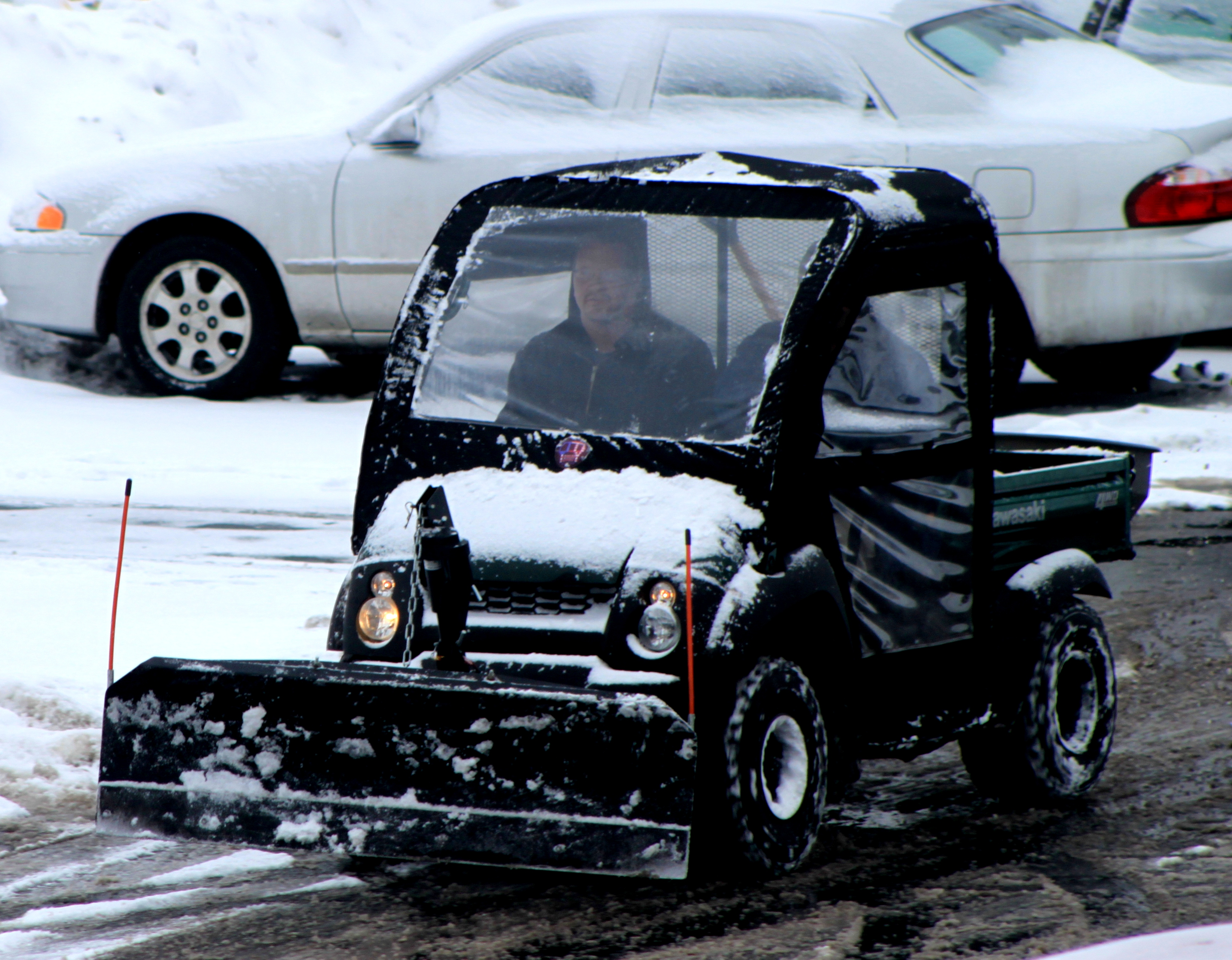
Kawasaki Mule used for snow removal

Vehicles like the Kawasaki MULE in which a flatbed is added to an all terrain vehicle. Generally used as a maintenance vehicle. A jeep is a type of light off-road vehicle, originally used by the US military, with four-wheel drive for general utility work that required travelling over rough terrain.

=== Coupé utility or tray utility vehicle ===
Vehicles featuring a coupé passenger compartment with an attached cargo bed. All-steel-bodied, sedan-cabined utility vehicles, more commonly called utes, were popular in Australia.

=== Utility truck ===
Utility trucks or sport utility trucks (SUT), commonly known as pickup trucks in the United States, are similar to coupé utilities. The main difference is that they are either explicitly built for purpose or based upon sport utility vehicles rather than being produced by modifying existing passenger vehicles. They combine elements of road-going passenger cars with features from off-road vehicles, such as raised ground clearance and four-wheel drive.

=== Utility task vehicle ===
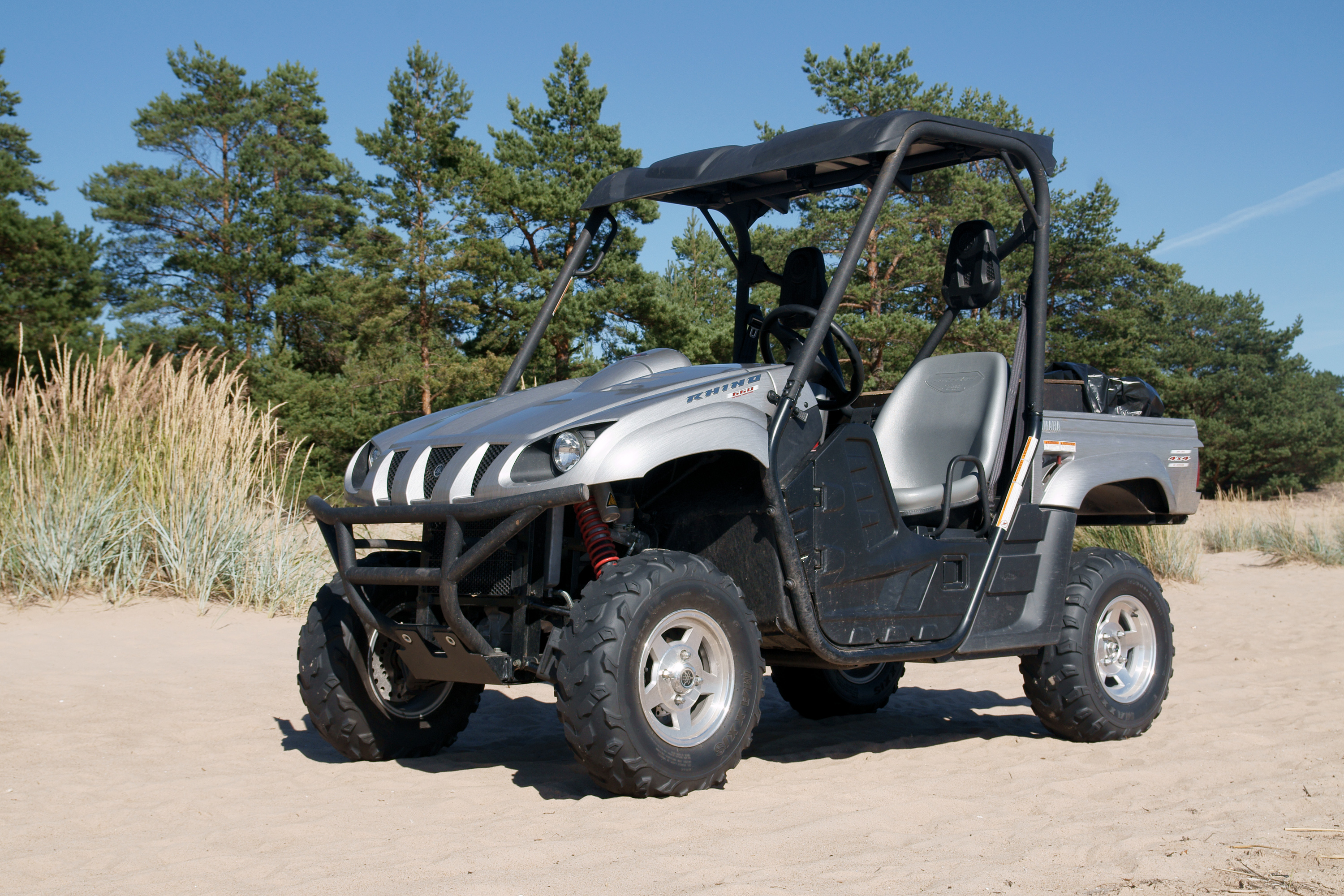
Yamaha Rhino

The Side-by-side (SxS), a utility task vehicle (UTV), is a small four-wheel off-road vehicle. It has a side-by-side seating arrangement, and UTVs often have seat belts, roll-over protection and a storage box at the vehicle's rear.

In 2017, the UTV category was added to the Rally Dakar.

== See also ==
- Ute (vehicle) – Vehicle with integrated cargo tray and passenger compartment
- Pickup truck – Light-duty truck with an enclosed cab and an open cargo area
- All-terrain vehicle – Light off-road vehicle
- Commercial vehicle – Road vehicle designed to transport persons or goods for compensation
- Squad Solar – Electric light utility vehicle with a solar roof and removable doors
