= 12-car rally =

Amateur rally races run by motor clubs in the UK

A 12-car rally is a type of car rally, often run by motor clubs as a simple and strictly amateur form of the sport.

12-car rallies are run to Navigational Rally rules, which are based on navigational skills rather than speed, and with usually a notable social element too. In the United Kingdom, the rules for 12-cars are governed by Motorsport UK and are as follows:

- Maximum of 12 competing vehicles per event (hence the name)
- Generally only standard road cars permitted, not fully prepared cars (this is at the discretion of the organising club, but is widely upheld)
- Maximum 30 mph average speed only
- "Plot 'n' bash" navigation only
- No timing to the second permitted, only to the previous minute
- "PR" (public relations) work as necessary if the route affects residential areas, this is as for a road rally but the requirements are not quite as strict
- Police to be informed of the event, though route information does not need to be submitted and approved
- Route authorisation must be granted from the Motorsport UK's local representative.
