= Group T5 =

FIA cross-country rally vehicle group

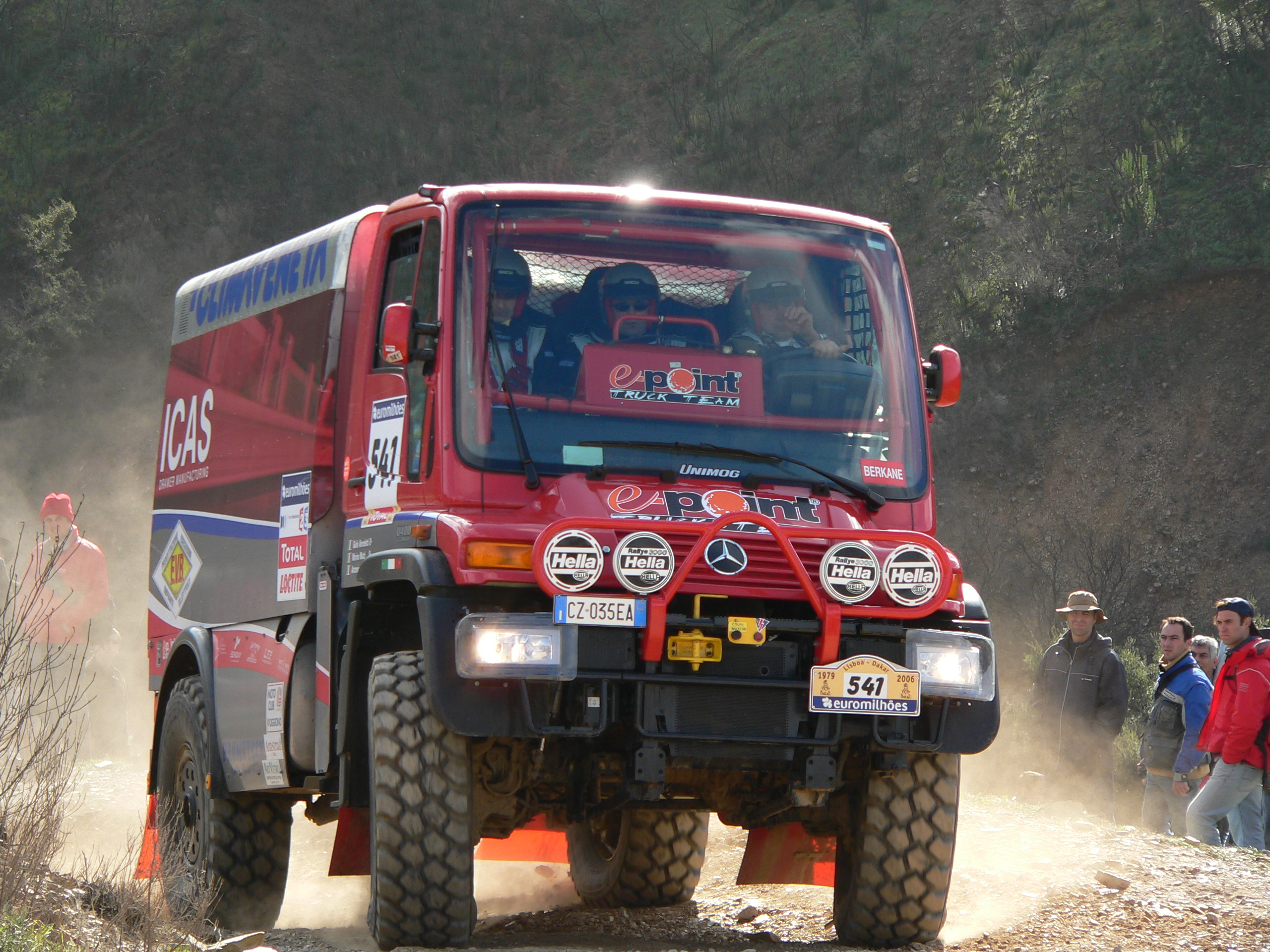
A Unimog U500 built to Group T4 (pre-2020) specifications in the 2006 Dakar Rally.

In relation to motorsport, Group T5 is a set of technical specifications for prototype cross-country trucks used in off-road Cross-Country Rallying (also called Rally Raid). The group is governed by the Fédération Internationale de l'Automobile (FIA) and defined in appendix J, article 287 of its International Sporting Code.

The FIA launched prototype trucks as Group T4 in 1990, however the Groups T were restructured in 2020 when lightweight vehicles were introduced and the number of car groups were reduced. As part of this Group T4 trucks became Group T5.

== Competition ==
Group T5 trucks competed in the FIA Cross Country Rally World Cup since its inception in 1993, and since 2022 in the World Rally-Raid Championship. However T5 trucks are not eligible to compete for the general classification or have a group classification title. The trucks can only compete for local rally raid victories or class victories.

== Regulations ==
Trucks eligible for Group T5 must comply with a fixed set of rules according to Appendix J, article 287. The homologation requirement was removed in 2020, each truck may be based from a series-production run of at least 200 units, or based on a chassis of a set FIA standard. The weight has a minimum of 6760 kg, or 8760 kg for vehicle with engines over 10,000cc. Despite certain modifications, the engine is a stock production engine with a maximum displacement of 13000cc. Because of safety regulations, the cabs have a very strong homologated roll cage. A diagonal bar in the rear of the roll cage is mandatory. More diagonal struts are advised.

== Classes ==
Within the World Rally Raid Championship, T5 classes may include FIA specification trucks or those permitted by the 2021 ASO Dakar Auto regulations which includes sub groups to Group T5:

- Group T5.1: Series production truck built according to FIA Group T5 regulations.
- Group T5.2: Modified truck conforming to ASO regulations and homologation.
- Group T5.3: Support trucks

== List of Group T4 (pre-2020) homologated vehicles ==
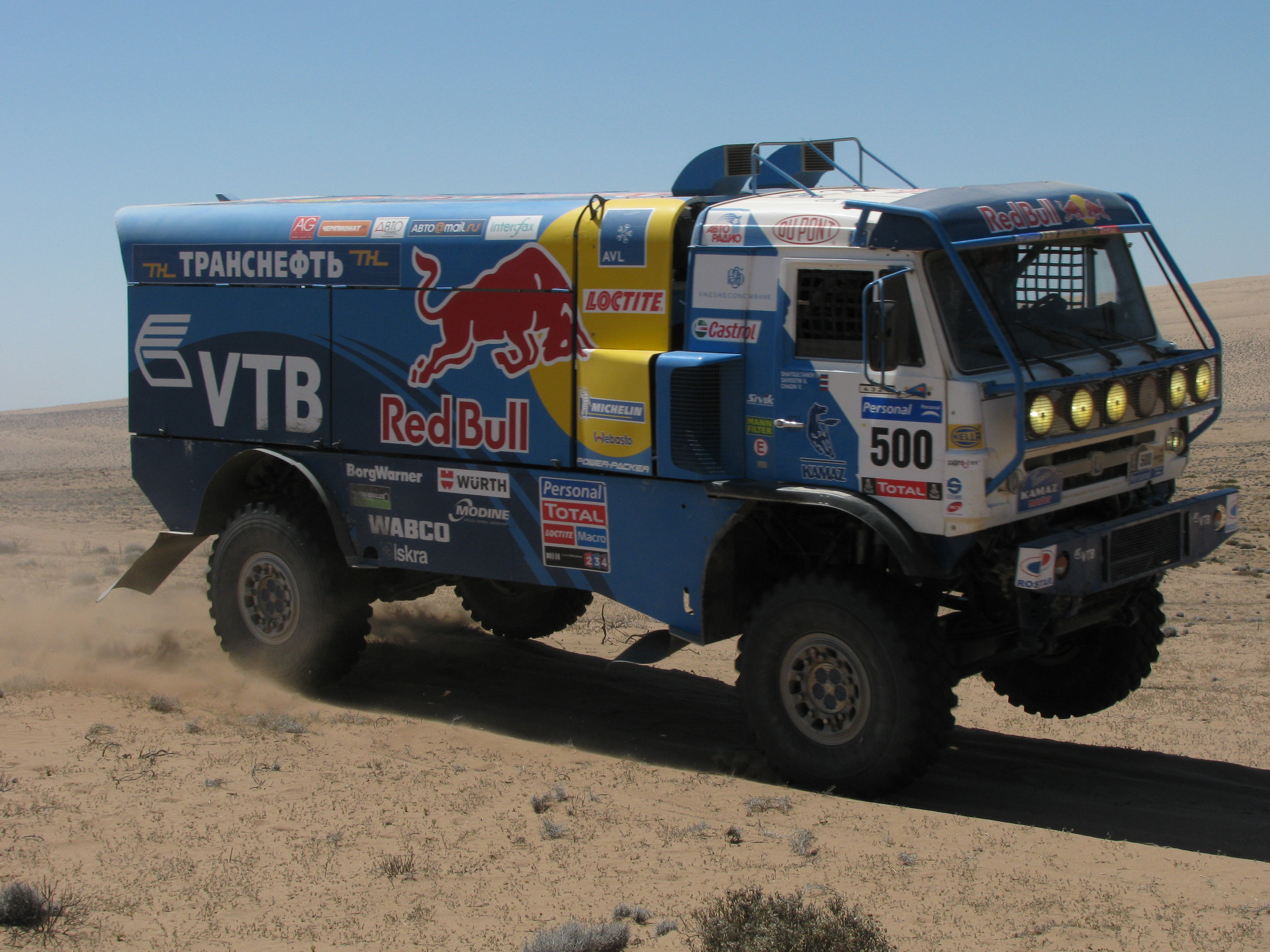
Kamaz 4326 in the 2006 Dakar Rally.

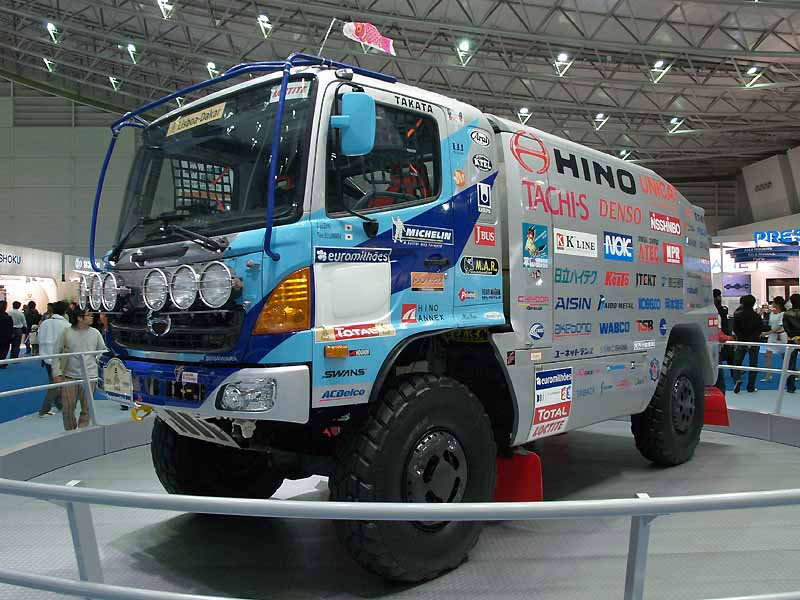
A Hino Ranger at the 2007 Tokyo Motor Show.

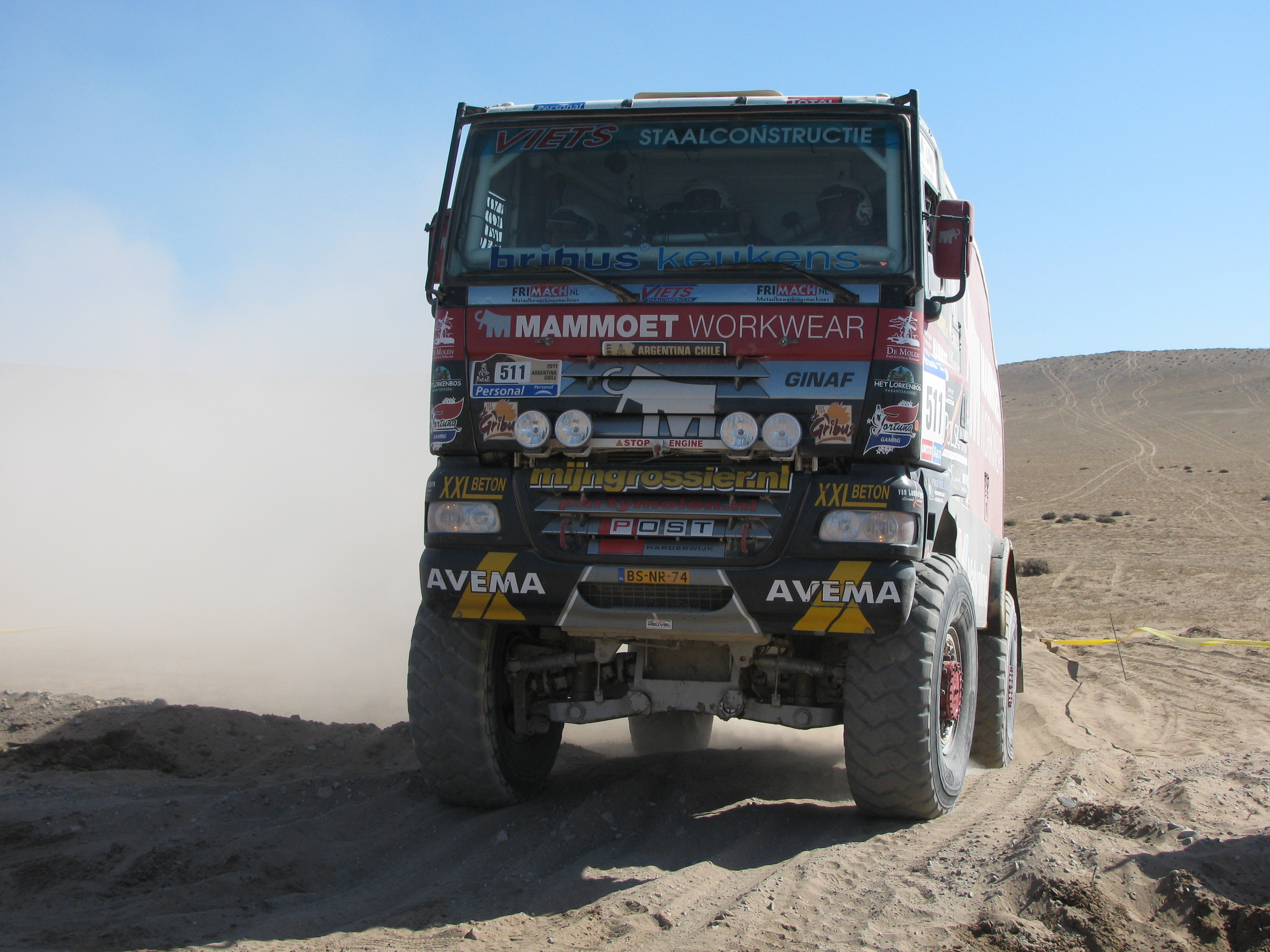
A Ginaf X2222 at the 2011 Dakar Rally.

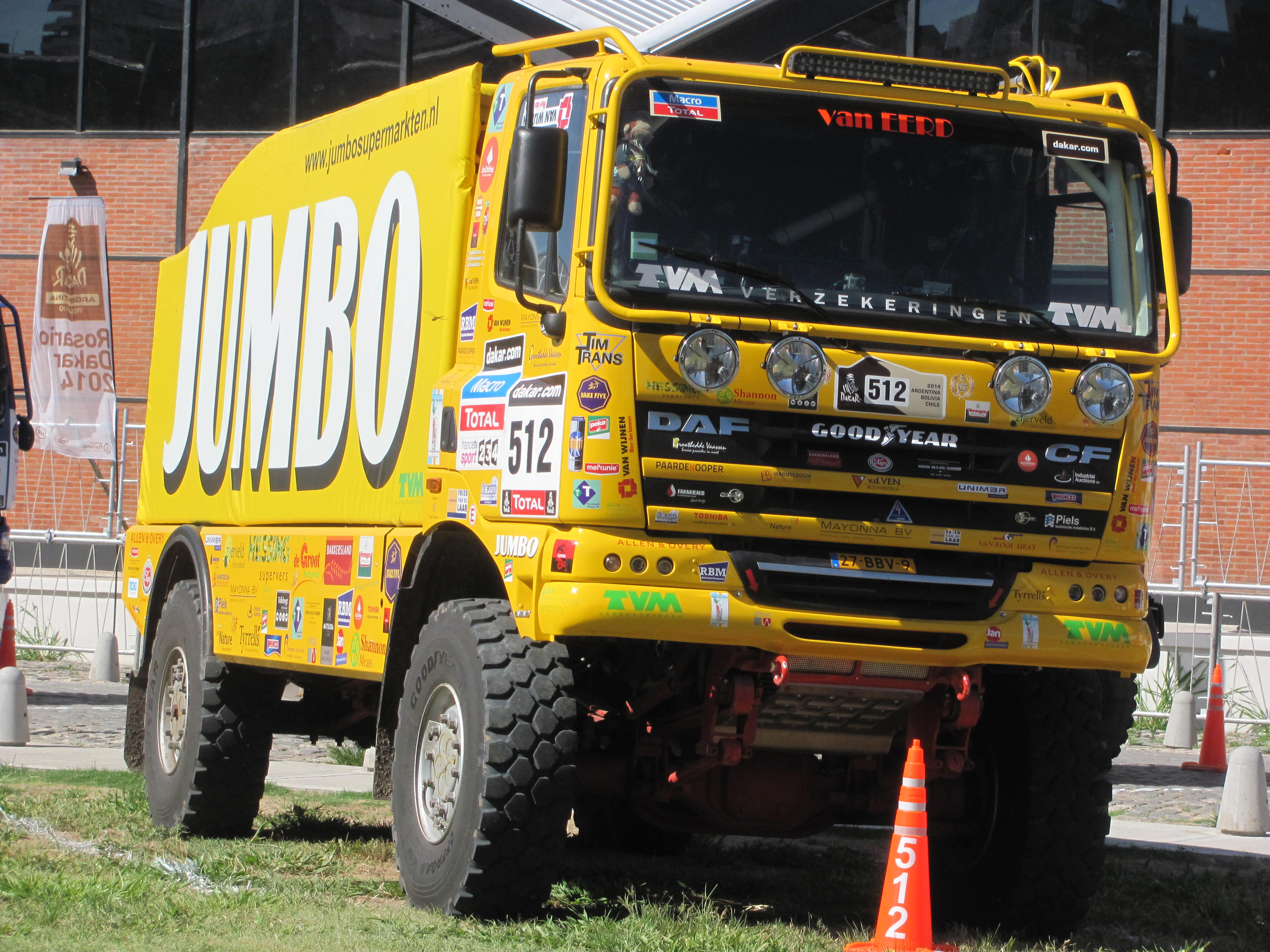
A DAF CF before the start of the 2014 Dakar Rally.

No.	Marque	Model	Type	Start	End
4001	(Russia) Kamaz	4310	10	May 1, 1992	December 31, 1999
4002	(Japan) Hino	Ranger	FT U-FT3HGA-LH	May 1, 1992	December 31, 2000
4003	(Czech Republic) Tatra	T815	PR1 6x6.1	August 1, 1992	December 31, 1999
4004	(Czech Republic) Tatra	T815	P27 4x4.1	August 1, 1992	December 31, 1999
4005	(Sweden) Scania	P 113	HK 4x4	August 1, 1992	December 31, 2003
4006	(Italy) Perlini	105F	Red Tiger 105 CI/A	August 1, 1992	December 31, 1994
4007	(Germany) Daimler-Benz	Actros	1935 AK	August 1, 1992	December 31, 2003
4008	(Germany) Daimler-Benz	Unimog	U1550 L37	August 1, 1992	December 31, 2003
4009	(Germany) Daimler-Benz	Actros	1936 AK	August 1, 1992	December 31, 1999
4010	(Russia) Ural	43223		September 1, 1992	December 31, 1999
4011	(Czech Republic) Tatra	T815	P17 6x6.1	January 1, 1993	December 31, 2000
4012	(Czech Republic) Tatra	T815	P28 4x4.1	January 1, 1993	December 31, 2000
4013	(Germany) Daimler-Benz	Actros	2635 AK	January 1, 1993	December 31, 2003
4014	(Germany) Daimler-Benz	Actros	2636 AK	January 1, 1993	December 31, 2004
4015	(France) Renault	C290	4x4	January 1, 1993	December 31, 2000
4017	(Czech Republic) LIAZ	154	154	January 1, 1993	December 31, 2000
4018	(Czech Republic) LIAZ	111	154 D	January 1, 1993	December 31, 2000
4019	(Germany) MAN	19.422	FA	January 1, 1993	December 31, 2007
4020	(Spain) IPV	180R		January 1, 1994	December 31, 2001
4021	(Czech Republic) Tatra	T815	290R75 4x4.1	January 1, 1994	December 31, 2001
4022	(Russia) Kamaz	49250		January 1, 1994	December 31, 2001
4023	(Russia) Kamaz	49252		November 1, 1994	December 31, 2001
4024	(Russia) Kamaz	49251		November 1, 1994	December 31, 2001
4025	(Japan) Hino	Ranger	FT U-FT3HGA-LS	January 1, 1995	December 31, 2005
4026	(Czech Republic) Tatra	T815	290R75/01 4x4.1	January 1, 1995	December 31, 2006
4027	(Italy) Iveco	135	E23W/RS	August 1, 1995	December 31, 2002
4028	(Netherlands) GINAF		F2222 4x4	December 1, 1995	December 31, 2005
4029	(United States) AM General	Hummer	H1 Wagon/Truck	January 1, 1996	December 31, 2004
4030	(Japan) Hino	Ranger	FT FT1JGB-LU	January 1, 1996	December 31, 2006
4031	(Japan) Mitsubishi Fuso	Super Great	FR415	January 1, 1996	December 31, 2003
4032	(Russia) Kamaz	49255		October 1, 1996	December 31, 2003
4033	(Japan) Hino	Ranger	FT FT1JGB-LD	January 1, 1997	December 31, 2007
4034	(Germany) Daimler-Benz	Actros	1844 AK	January 1, 1997	December 31, 2004
4035	(Austria) ÖAF	30	502 VFAEG	April 1, 1997	December 31, 2004
4036	(Japan) Mitsubishi Fuso	Super Great	FR415	January 1, 1998	December 31, 2005
4037	(Czech Republic) Tatra	T815	2ZER55 16.400 4x4.1	January 1, 1998	December 31, 2006
4038	(Germany) MAN	SX90	DFAEG	January 1, 1998	December 31, 2005
4039	(Romania) Roman	26.550	DFA	December 1, 1998	December 31, 2009
4040	(Romania) Roman	16.550	DFA	December 1, 1998	December 31, 2009
4041	(France) Renault	Kerax	385 6x6 Type 33EVC2	January 1, 1999	December 31, 2016
4042	(Germany) MAN	L2000	10.224 LAEC	January 1, 1999	December 31, 2009
4043	(Netherlands) GINAF		M2223	December 1, 2000	December 31, 2007
4044	(Germany) MAN	M2000	18.284 LAEC	May 1, 2001	December 31, 2008
4045	(Italy) SCAM	SMT	35.3D	October 1, 2001	December 31, 2008
4046	(France) Renault	Kerax	420 33BVB4	January 1, 2002	December 31, 2013
4047	(Germany) MAN	F2000	19.464 FAC	December 1, 2001	December 31, 2008
4048	(Russia) Kamaz	4911		January 1, 2003	December 31, 2013
4049	(Germany) MAN	27.464	DFAC	January 1, 2003	December 31, 2010
4050	(Czech Republic) Tatra	T815	2ZVR45 16.400 4x4.1	January 1, 2003	December 31, 2010
4051	(Czech Republic) Tatra	T815	2TVR45 14.1450 4x4.1	January 1, 2003	December 31, 2010
4052	(Netherlands) DAF	FAV	CF 75.530	January 1, 2003	December 31, 2010
4053	(Netherlands) GINAF		X2222	December 1, 2003	December 31, 2010
4054	(Netherlands) GINAF		X2223	December 1, 2003	December 31, 2010
4054	(Italy) Iveco	MP190	E44W	January 1, 2004	December 31, 2011
4055	(Italy) Iveco	ML140	E24W	January 1, 2004	December 31, 2013
4057	(Japan) Hino	Ranger	Pro FT FT1JGP	January 1, 2004	December 31, 2011
4058	(Germany) Daimler-Benz	Unimog	U400	January 1, 2004	December 31, 2014
4059	(Germany) Daimler-Benz	Unimog	U500	January 1, 2004	December 31, 2014
4060	(Germany) MAN	18.530	FAC	January 1, 2005	
4061	(Germany) MAN	18.531	FAC	January 1, 2006	
4062	(Czech Republic) Tatra	T815	2ZOR45 12 400 4x4.1	January 1, 2006	
4063	(Czech Republic) Tatra	T815	2TOR45 12 450 4x4.1	January 1, 2006	
4064	(Italy) Iveco	AT190	T44W	January 1, 2006	
4065	(Germany) MAN	TGA	18.480	January 1, 2007	
4066	(Germany) Daimler-Chrysler	Axor	1833 AK 4x4	December 1, 2007	
4067	(Russia) Kamaz	4326		January 1, 2008	
4068	(Germany) MAN	TGA	26.480	January 1, 2008	

== See also ==
- Cross-Country Cars
  - Group T1 - prototype
  - Group T2 - series production
- Lightweight Cross-Country Vehicles
  - Group T3 - prototype
  - Group T4 - series production side-by-side vehicles
- Cross-Country Trucks
  - Group T5 - prototype and series production
- Trophy truck
