= Rally support truck =

Assistance vehicle in a rallying race

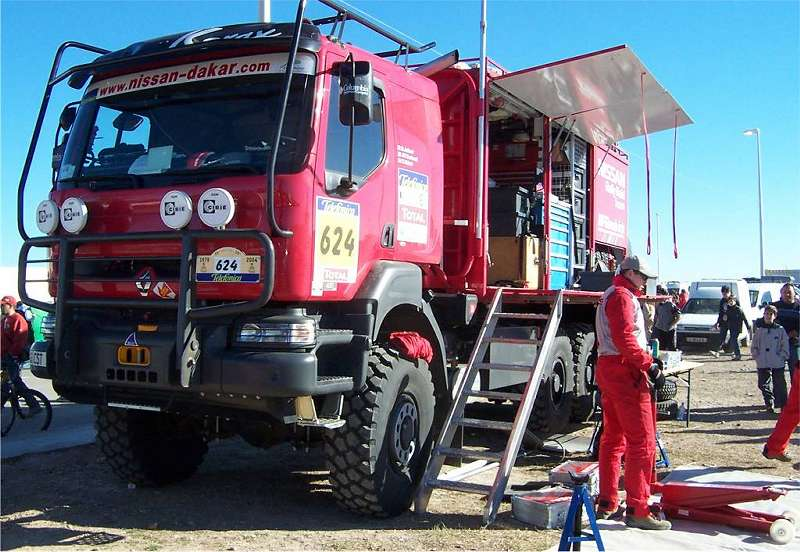
T4 Assistance truck at the 2004 Dakar Rally.

A rally support truck or rally assistance truck is an off-road truck that supports a vehicle that is competing in a rallying race, especially in rally raid. There are two types of support trucks: T6 trucks only travel from service area to service area and are not allowed onto the race route, whereas T5.3 trucks are entered as competitors, but whose mission is to assist other teams, not fight for the win.

== T5.3 support trucks ==
T5.3 trucks (until 2019: T4 trucks) have their cargo area filled with spare parts and tools to repair damaged vehicles. Some of the crew members are mechanics. When a competitor requires support, the truck driver steers off the course and goes to the point the vehicle is located to help repair it. This takes advantage of the rules where a service crew cannot provide help to a competing vehicle while it is in a timed stage, but competitors are allowed to support each other.

Teams which field support trucks in a rally are often hired to assist other teams. Major teams have their own support trucks, where the mechanics are team members and know the vehicles, and teammates will provide good and fast service.

== T6 support trucks ==
T6 trucks (until 2019: T5 trucks) are often larger and are not designed to be raced off-road, although they do have off-road capabilities in order to traverse tough terrain. These trucks travel from bivouac to bivouac (service area come night, or a halt during a multi-day rally). They generally pack up and leave from a bivouac in the morning as the competitors leave and use public highways / designated routes to reach the next bivouac ahead of the competitor. They often arrive just before the competitors, giving them just a few minutes to set up their service area.

The teams often live out of these trucks for the duration of the rally, so they carry tents, food items, tables, chairs, etc and are equipped with water tanks, showers, generators, air compressors, and anything else required during the rally.

== See also ==
- Group T5
