= Hino Ranger =

Hino Ranger Hino 500 Series
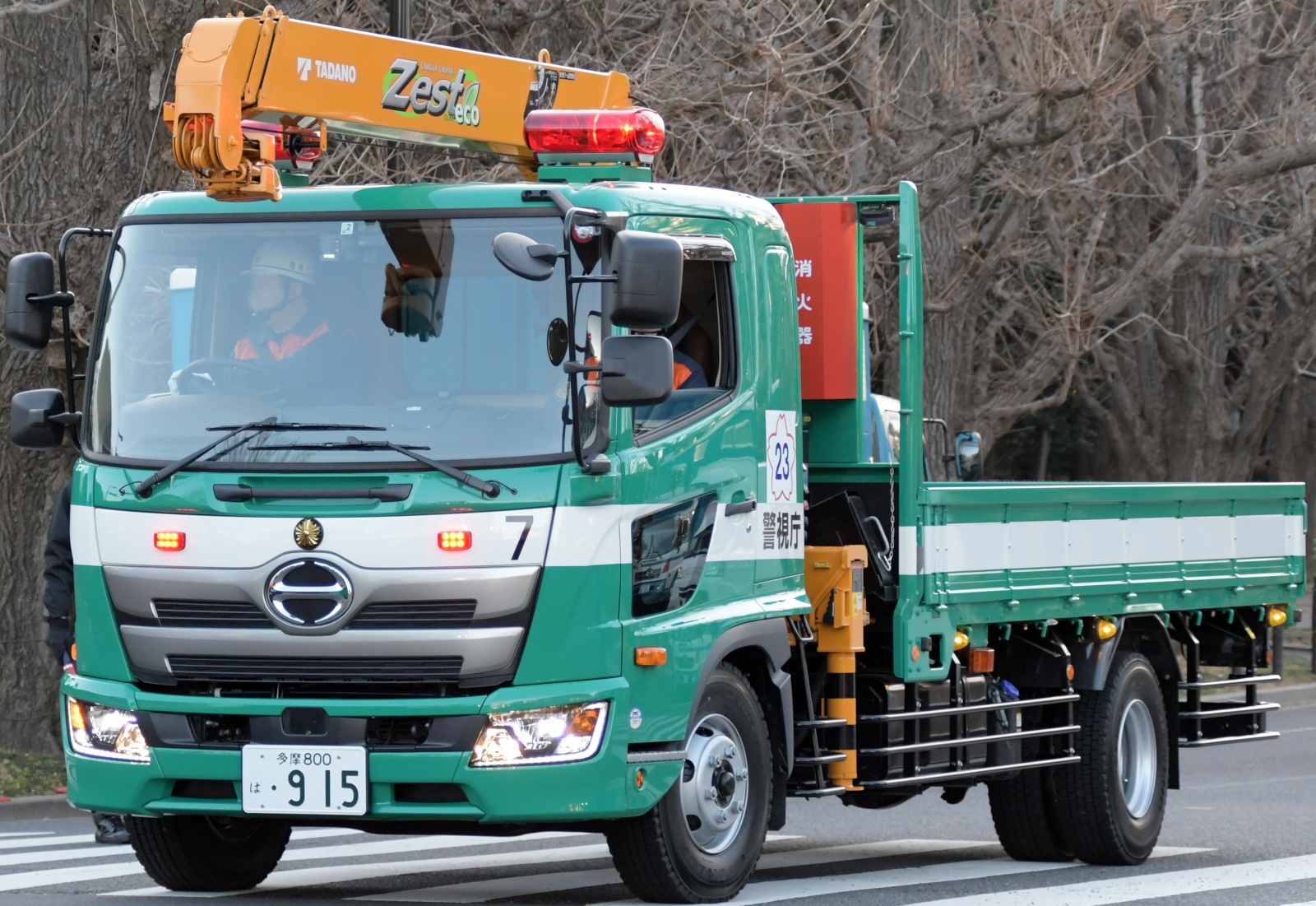
- Hino Ranger GD

Overview
- Manufacturer: Hino Motors; Kia; Kuozui Motors
- Also called: Hino 500 Series; Hino Validus; Ford N-Series; Kia Rhino; Hino Mega (Thailand); Hino Victor (Thailand); Hino Dominator (Thailand); Mitsubishi Fuso Fighter (2026–present)
- Production: 1964–present
- Assembly: Japan: Toyota City (Honsha plant); Indonesia: Purwakarta; Malaysia: Seremban; Philippines: Calamba; Colombia: Cota (Cundinamarca) (HMMC); Thailand: Samut Prakan

Body and chassis
- Class: Medium-duty truck; Heavy-duty truck
- Body style: 2-door standard cab; 4-door crew cab

Powertrain
- Engine: Diesel: 4.0 L (4,009 cc) W04D I4; 4.3 L (4,313 cc) DM100 I4; 4.5 L (4,507 cc) DQ100 I4; 5.0 L (5,000 cc) EC100 I4; 5.2 L (5,213 cc) J05E I4; 5.2 L (5,213 cc) A05C I4; 5.8 L (5,759 cc) W06D I6; 6.0 L (6,014 cc) W06E I6; 6.7 L (6,728 cc) H07C I6; 7.4 L (7,412 cc) H07D I6; 7.7 L (7,684 cc) J08E I6; 8.0 L (7,961 cc) J08C I6; 8.9 L (8,866 cc) A09C I6; 10.5 L (10,520 cc) P11C I6
- Transmission: 5-speed manual; 6-speed manual; 4-speed automatic; 6-speed automatic; 9-speed synchromesh manual; 9-speed Road Ranger non-synchronous manual

The Hino Ranger (Japanese: 日野レンジャー) is a medium or heavy duty commercial truck produced by Hino Motors since 1964. In the domestic market, its principal competitors are Isuzu Forward, Nissan Diesel/UD Condor and Mitsubishi Fuso Fighter.

Outside of Japan, it is also known as the '500 Series' and as part of the 'F-Series,' 'G-Series' and 'S-Series'. There has also been a partial divergence into a heavier and a lighter range, with the latter distinguished by various prefixes or suffixes such as "Day Cab Ranger" or "Ranger 2". In certain countries, the Ranger was only available as a medium or heavy truck before models with low weight ratings, like the FA and FB, were replaced by the Hino Dutro.

== First generation (1964–1983) ==
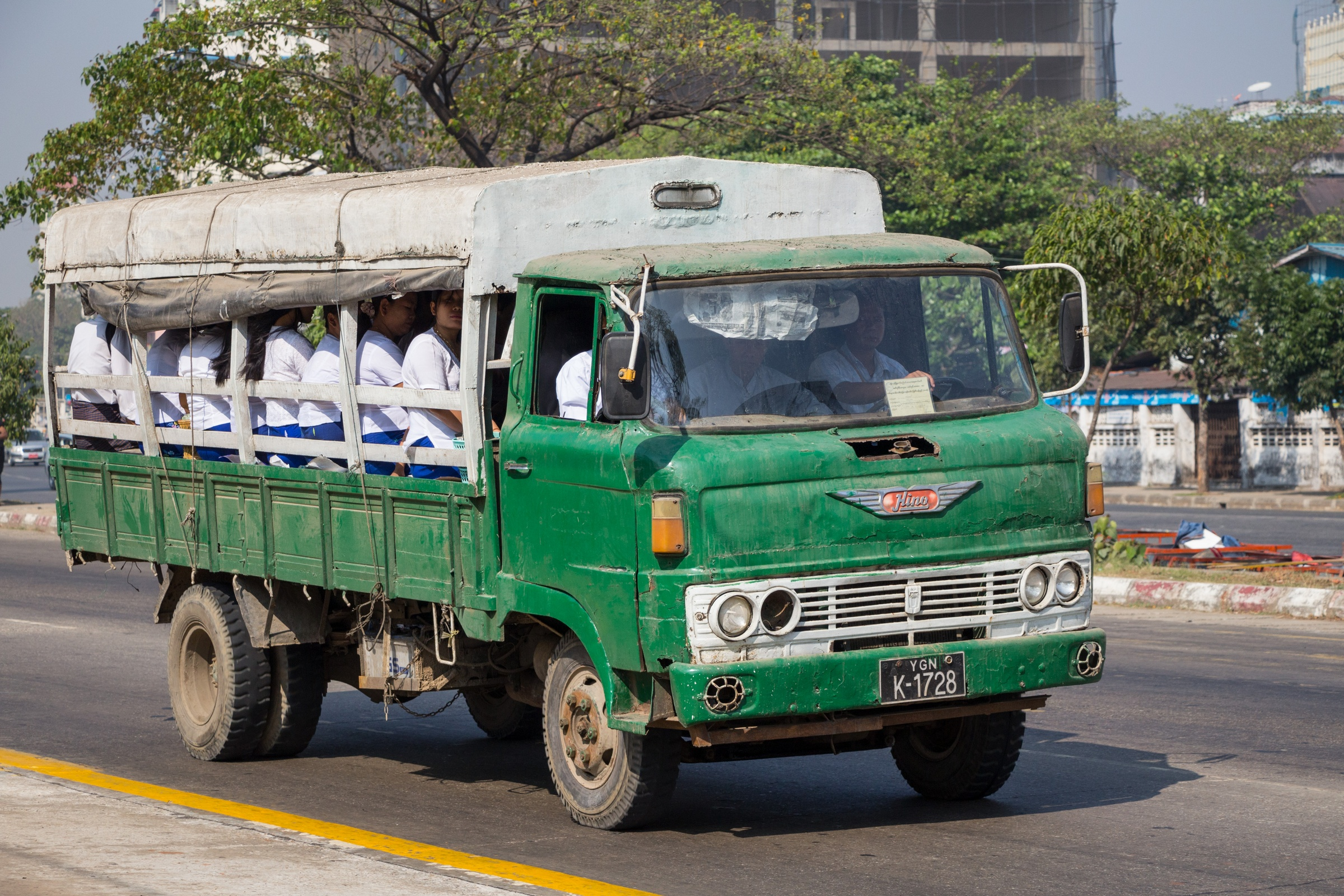
First generation Hino Ranger (second facelift model)

The first Hino Ranger appeared as the 3.5-tonne "Ranger KM300" in June 1964, landing in Japan's newly competitive middleweight truck category. There was also a short wheelbase model called the KM320. The long-wheelbase KM340 appeared in December, and the cabin became a three-seater (rather than two) in 1966. The first model had a body-colored grille and separate headlamp surrounds; this was changed with a facelift in November 1967, when the headlights were integrated into the grille. Until they were changed in 1968, the Ranger had suicide doors. In November 1969 the design was changed again, now with twin headlamps in a grille painted a contrasting colour. More importantly, the cab was made 55 mm (2.2 in) longer, improving comfort. The Ranger KM was not a very strong seller, being limited to 3,500 kg (7,700 lb) cargo capacity while the licensing system favored 4-tonne trucks.

The original engine produced 90 PS (66 kW). Along with the 1967 facelift came ten extra horsepower, although the six-cylinder DM100 unit still displaced 4,313 cc (263.2 cu in). In April 1971 the wheelbases were changed across the range, meaning new model numbers: KM310 (regular), KM330 (short), and KM350 (long). In April 1978 the engine was switched to the new DQ100 and various safety improvements (high-backed seats, larger rear view mirrors) were introduced. The new DQ100 engine displaced 4,507 cc (275.0 cu in) and output increased to 110 PS (81 kW). The line was now designated KM500, with the short wheelbase (usually sold as a dump truck) called the KM520 and the long wheelbase model called the KM540.

In 1978, the 2-tonne Hino Ranger 2 was launched, a rebadged Toyota Dyna (also sold as the Daihatsu Delta) with Daihatsu or Toyota engines. This then spawned a 3-tonne version, called the Ranger 3. By late 1979, the Ranger KM received a name change as well becoming the Hino Ranger 3M. The Ranger also met the latest (1979) emissions regulations. When the emissions were tightened again in 1983, the Ranger 3M received its last modifications to meet them and was now equipped with a chrome-bordered grille. In 1984, production of the KM ended as it was replaced by the Day Cab Ranger.

== Second generation (1969–1980) ==
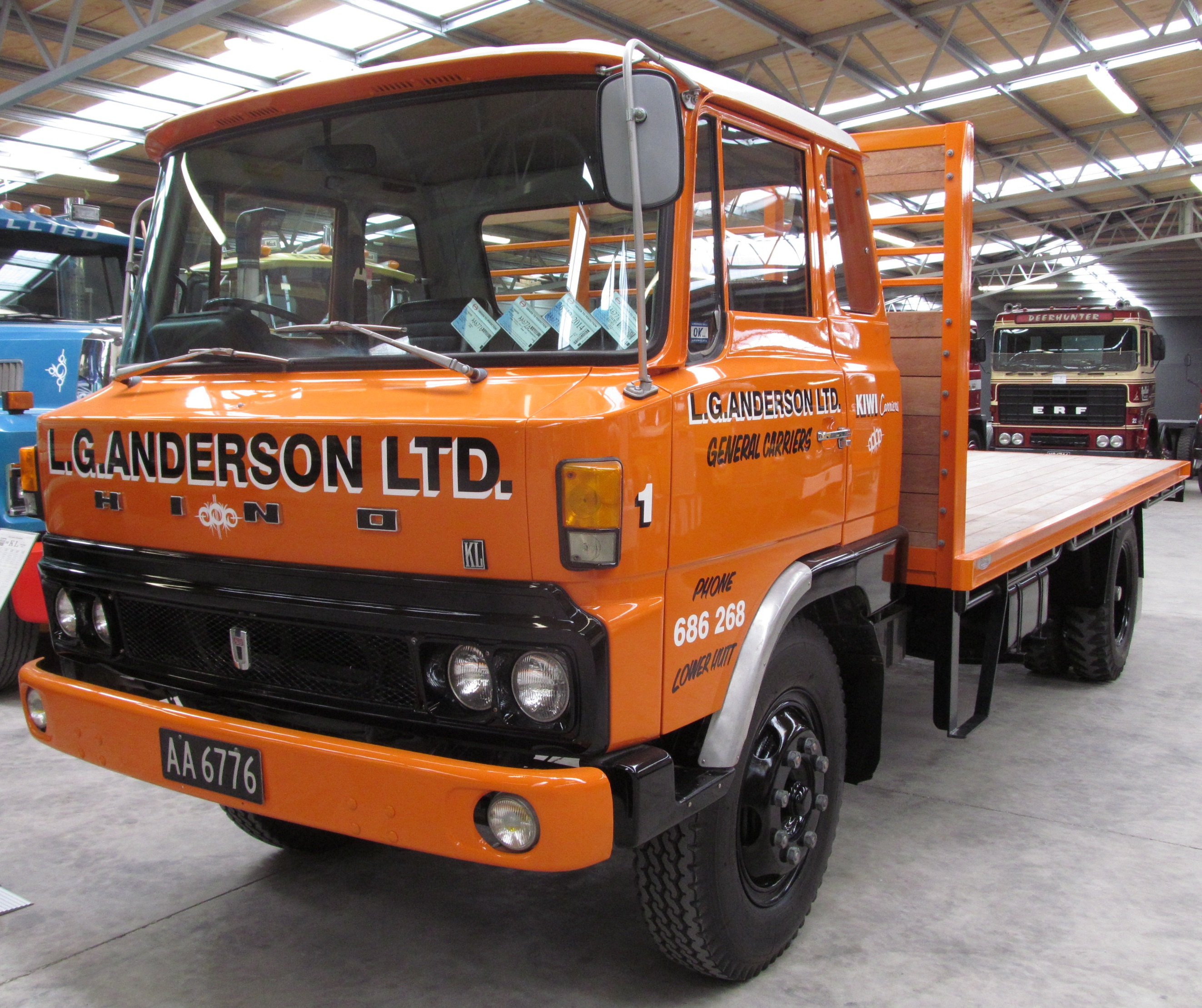
Hino KL340

The Hino Ranger KL was introduced in Japan in 1969. The Ranger also served as a replacement for the Toyota Massy Dyna which was discontinued in 1979. In Australia, it was sold as the Toyota KL300. The Ranger KL-series was offered as the short wheelbase KL300, medium wheelbase KL340 and KL350, as well as the long wheelbase KL360 and KL380. The Ranger line-up further spawned into KB, KR, KQ, and other models. Engines offered were the 4.5 liter DQ100 and 5.0 liter EC100.

== Third generation (1980–1989), Indonesia (1985–2002) ==
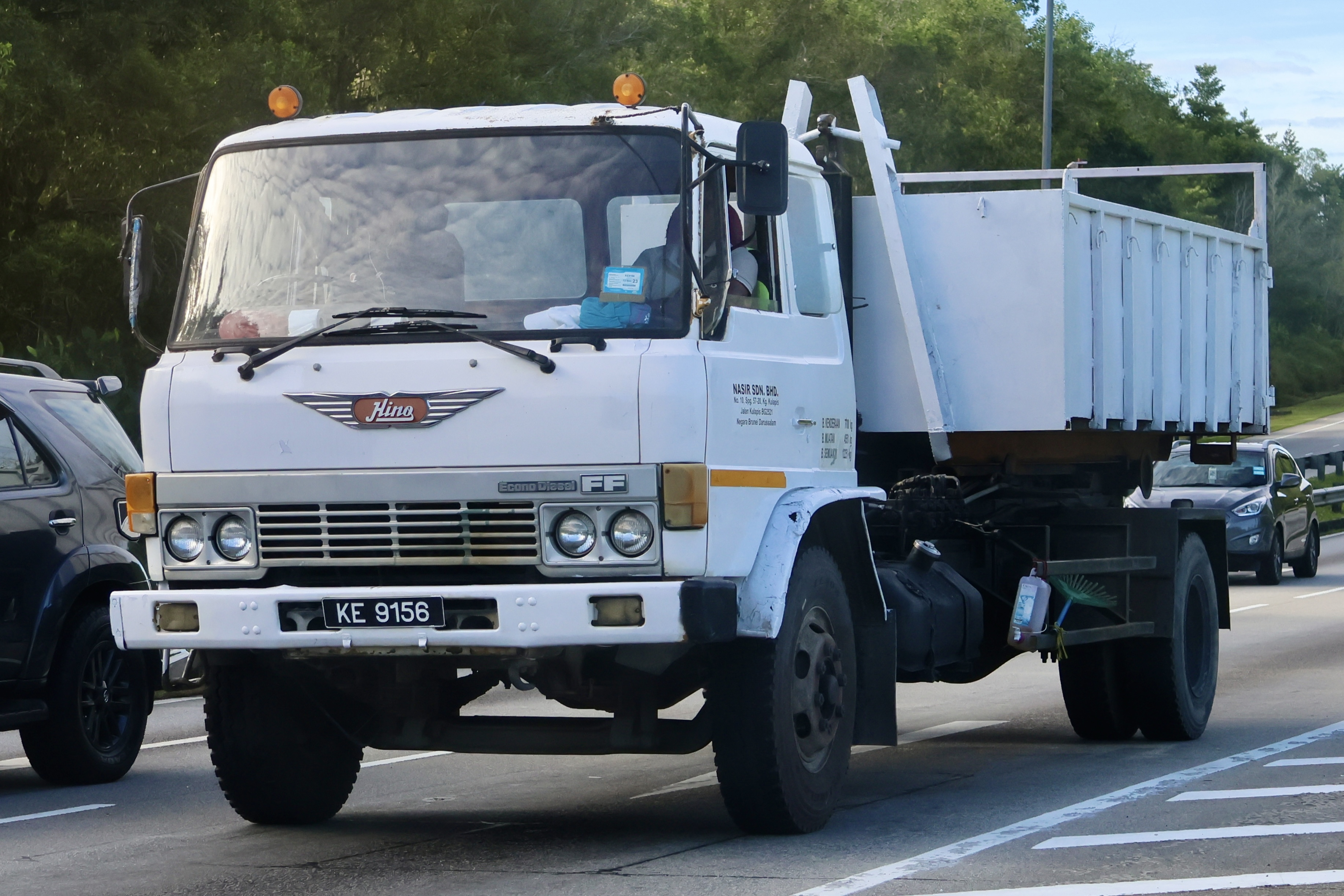
Pre-facelift Hino Ranger FF173 (Brunei)

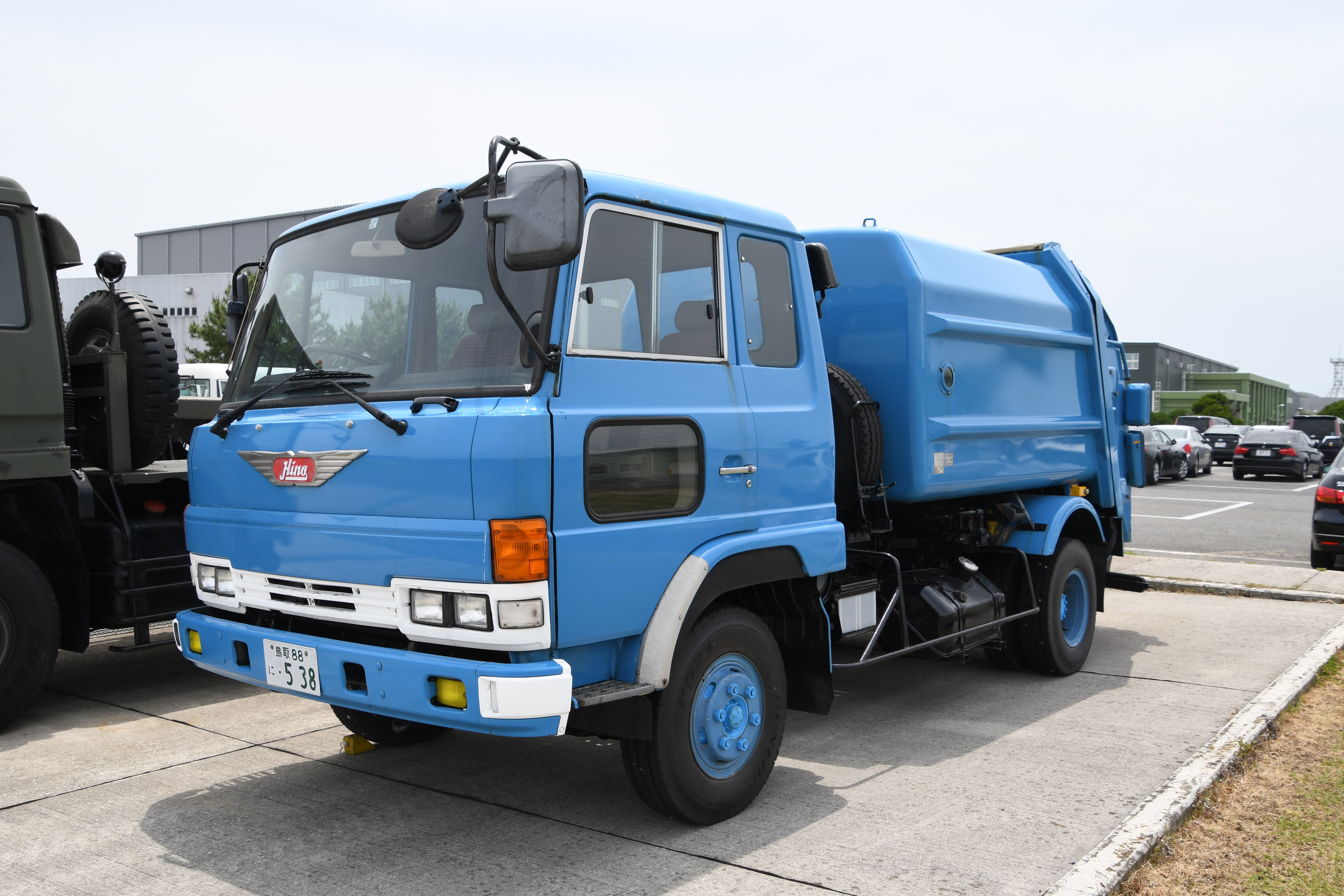
Second facelift Hino Ranger FF173 (Japan)

Introduced in Japan in 1980, early models (marketed as Wind Ranger in Japan) have twin round headlights, while facelift models (marketed as Ranger +5 and ONE UP Ranger +5 in Japan) come with slimmer rectangular units. The engine range was also updated. The cab design was inspired by European trucks and was 35 percent more aerodynamic than its predecessor according to Hino. The cab was assembled by robots.

From 1982, Ford Motor Company and Hino signed a deal for badge-engineered trucks to be known as the Ford N series for release in the Australian and New Zealand markets to replace the Ford D series trucks. The deal lasted 15 years.

From 1988 to 1998, the third generation Ranger was manufactured under license by Kia Motors and sold as the first generation Kia Rhino in South Korea.

The third generation Ranger was the first Hino model sold in the United States with the first variants FE17, FE19, FF17, FF19, FG19 and FG22 introduced in 1983 for the 1984 model year. In North America, the Ranger name was not used and all trucks were sold under their model numbers. After 1987 the lineup consisted of the four-cylinder Day Cab Ranger FA and FB models (Class 3 and Class 5, respectively), the larger Class 5 Hino GC (six-cylinder 160-hp diesel), the Class 6 FD with the same engine and the turbocharged larger FE (still Class 6). The heaviest Hino sold in the United States was the Class 7 FG- and SG-series, also from the Ranger family. Production of the third generation for the North American market ended in 1992 when it was replaced by the fourth generation model.

Japanese model production began tapering off in 1989 (export models and special use versions continued to be manufactured until 1992 at least), while Indonesian models lasted until 2003.

Indonesia

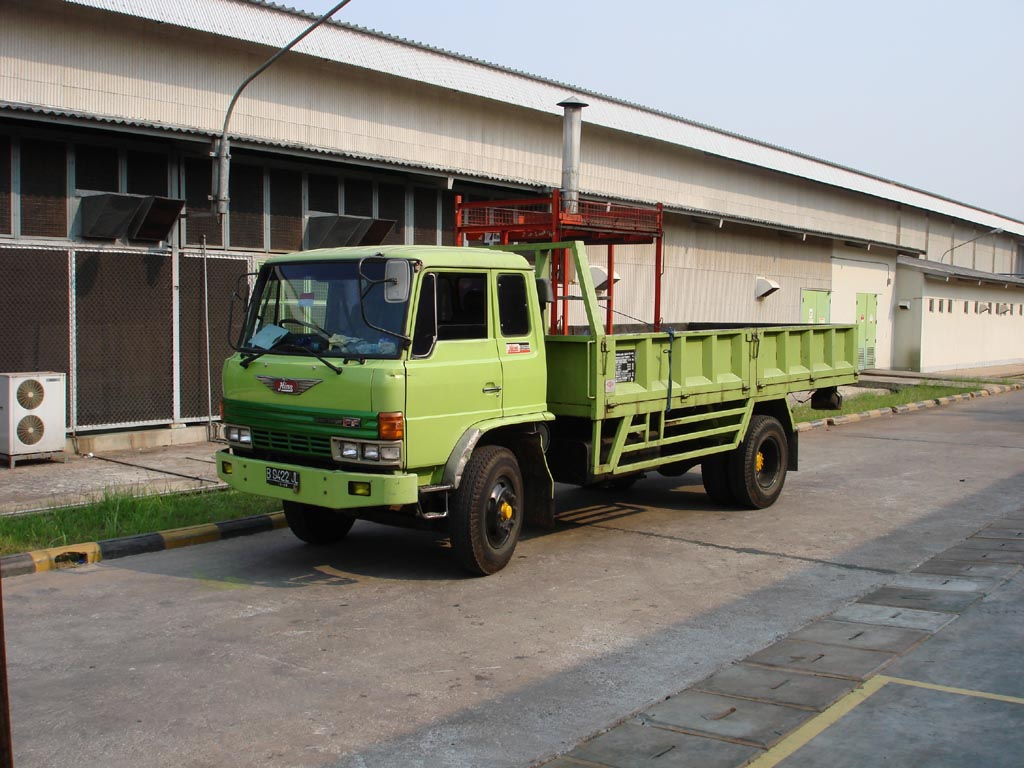
First facelift Hino Super Ranger (FF173NA, Indonesia)

Models in Indonesia are FF172, FF173, FL176, FM226, and SG221. The FF and SG were marketed as Super Ranger, the FL and FM are Jumbo Ranger. The well equipped FF Super Ranger was introduced in late 1985 and offered features such as dual circuit power brakes, a tilt steering wheel, and a 175 PS (129 kW) diesel engine.

=== Day Cab Ranger (1984–1995) ===
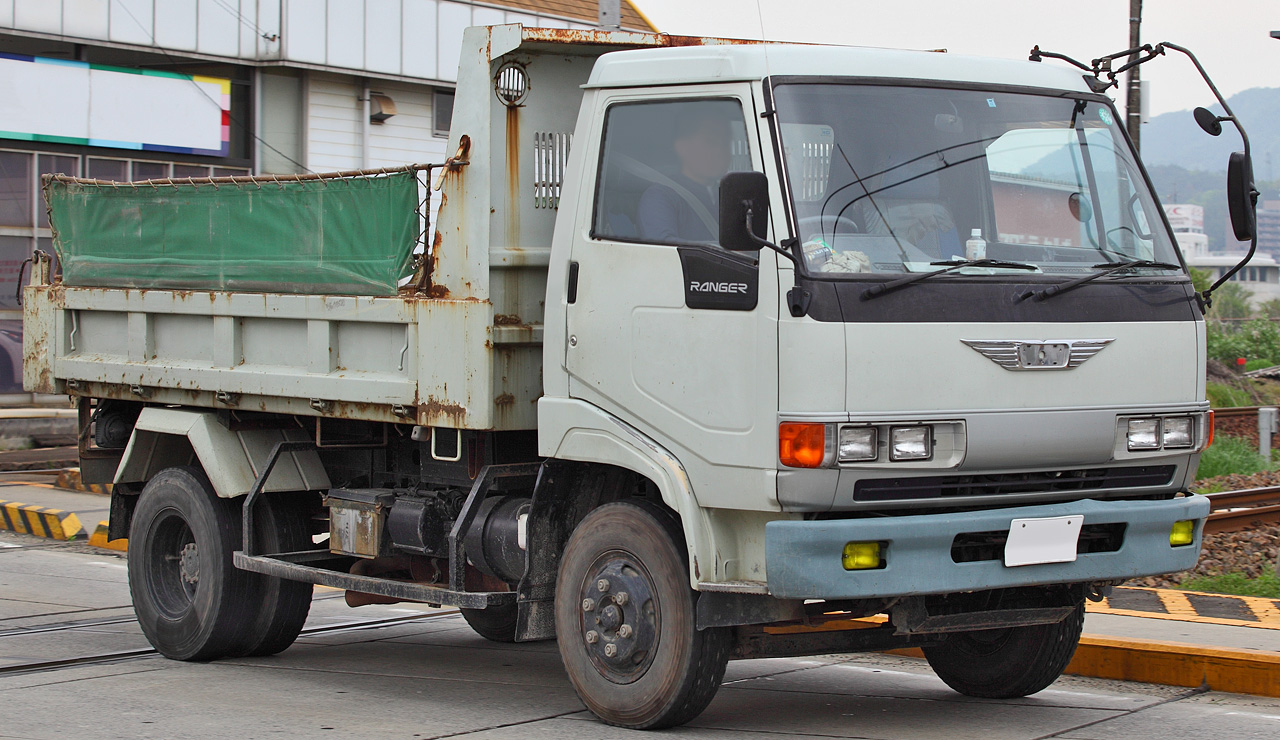
Facelift Hino Day Cab Ranger (FC3H, Japan)

The original KM-series Ranger was finally discontinued as the new, medium-duty Day Cab Ranger debuted in June 1984. Unlike competitors from other manufacturers, who used cabs from their light truck production, the Day Cab Ranger was a dedicated design. It was available as a 3.5-tonner ("3B") or a 4.5-tonner ("4C"). The available engines were all diesels: the 4,009 cc (4.0 L) W04D four-cylinder, the 5,759 cc (5.8 L) W06D six-cylinder, or the 6,728 cc (6.7 L) H07C for heavier-duty applications. Power outputs were 115 PS (85 kW) for the four-cylinder, 145 and 175 PS (107 and 129 kW) for the six-cylinder engines. In November 1988, the Day Cab Ranger was facelifted, receiving a new, smoother grille.

In May 1990, the Day Cab Ranger received a thorough facelift, with new glazed doors and a new front treatment. The engines now met the 1989 emissions standards. The W04D remained, although output was increased to 120 PS (88 kW), while the W06D was replaced by the 6,014 cc (6.0 L) W06E rated at 165 PS (121 kW) and the H07C was replaced by the 7,412 cc (7.4 L) H07D rated at 195 PS (143 kW). The 3B and 4C names were dropped and they were now mainly referred to as Ranger FB and Ranger FC. In 1995, the Day Cab Ranger was replaced by the lighter versions of the (fourth generation) "Rising Ranger" although production continued for North America until the end of model year 1997. North American market Day Cab Rangers were sold as the Hino FA and FB, fitted with a 125 hp (93 kW) version of the W04D engine.

1984 also marked the appearance of the second generation Ranger 2/3, a series of two- and three-tonne trucks which were actually rebadged Toyota Dynas.

== Fourth generation (1989–2002) ==
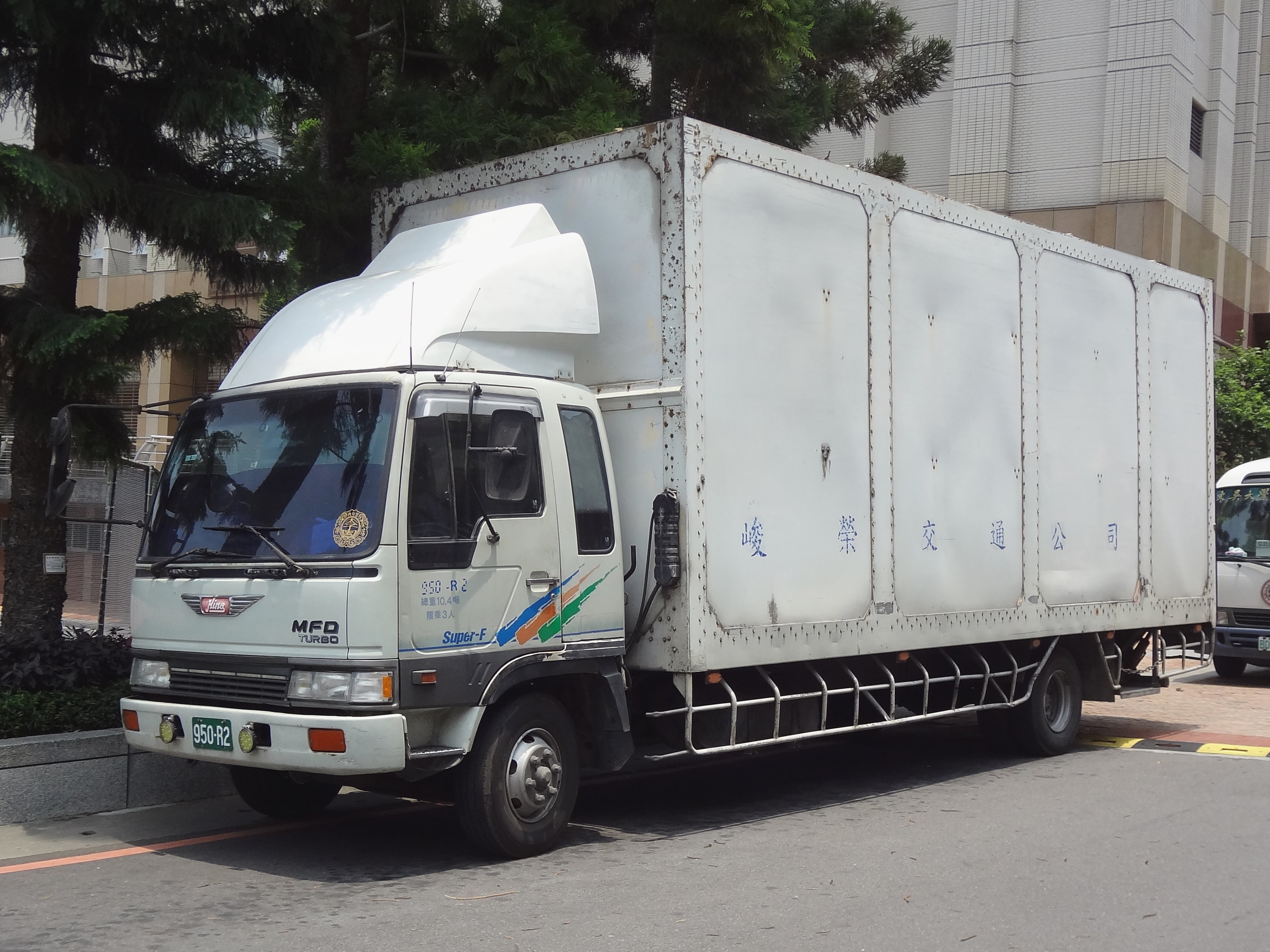
Pre-facelift Hino Ranger MFD (Taiwan)

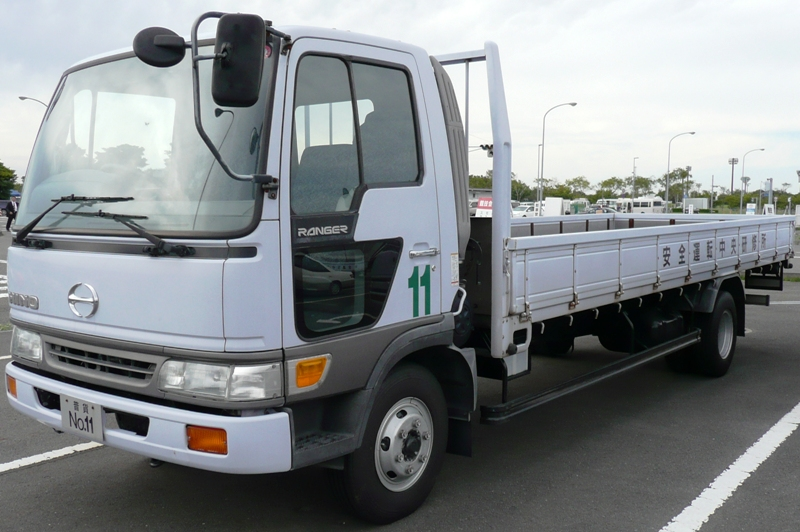
First facelift Hino Rising Ranger (Japan)

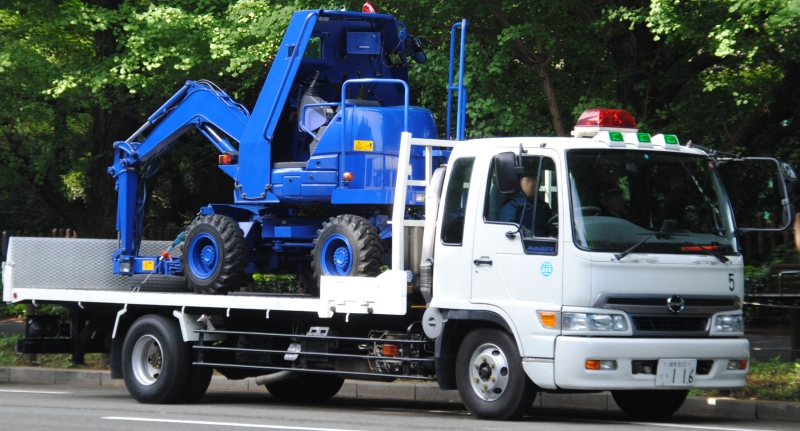
Second facelift Hino Space Ranger (Japan)

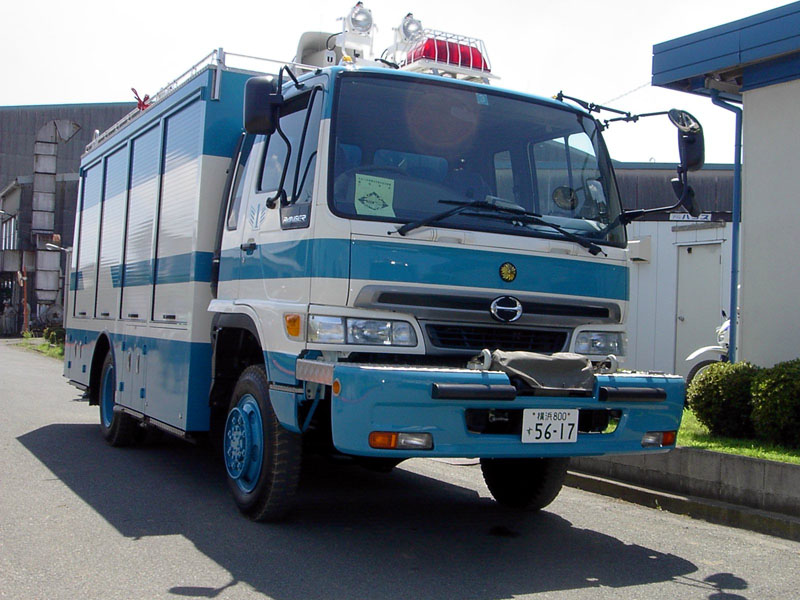
Hino Space Ranger FT 4x4 (Japan)

In Japan, the fourth generation Ranger was introduced in 1989. It was initially marketed as the Cruising Ranger, becoming the Rising Ranger with its first facelift in 1994, and finally as the Space Ranger following the second facelift in 1999. The lightweight models, first introduced in 1995 as part of the Rising Ranger line, replaced the earlier "Day Cab Ranger" as the two lines were unified.

- Light Truck: FA, FB
- Light Medium Truck: FC, FD, FE, GD
- Medium Heavy Truck 4x2: FF, FG
- Medium Truck 4x4: FT, GT, GX
- Tractor Head: SG

Hino entered three Ranger FTs in the 1997 Dakar Rally, and results were 1-2-3 overall in the Camion (Truck) Category.

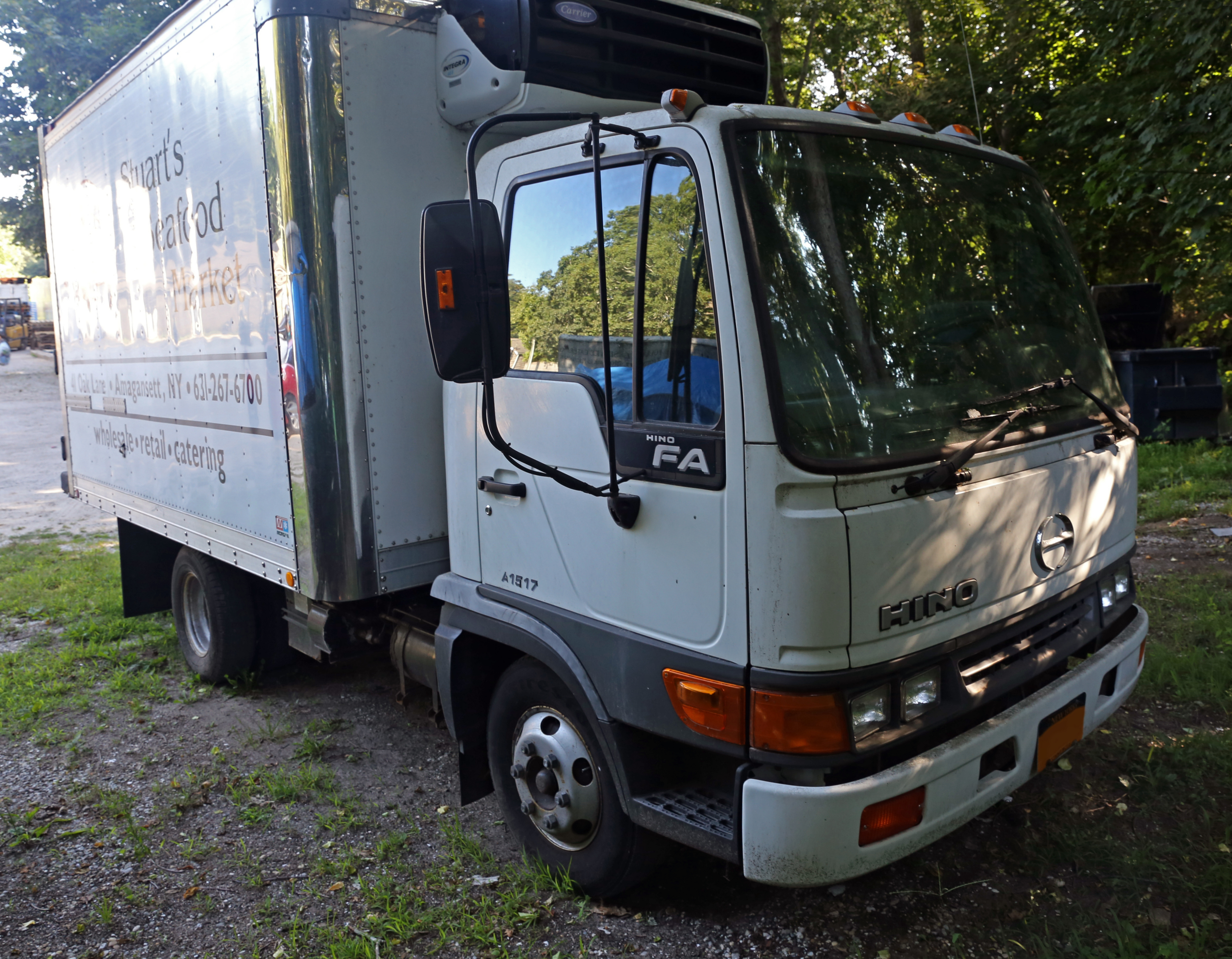
Facelift Hino Ranger FA1517 (US)

In North America, Hino continued using model numbers instead of the Ranger name for its medium truck. Introduced in 1992 for the 1993 model year, the initial models were FD2218, FD2218LP, FE2618, FF3018, FF3020, SG3320, SG3323 and SG3325. The lineup was refreshed in 1997 for the 1998 model year with a minor facelift, new engines, new gross vehicle weight ratings and new light-duty models namely FA1517 and FB1817. The refreshed medium-duty and medium-heavy lineup consisted of FF2220, FD2320, FE2620, FF3020, SG3320, and SG3325. The first two digits indicate the Gross Vehicle Weight Rating (GVWR), and the last two digits refer to engine power. FA1517 means the smallest truck with 15,000 lb (6,804 kg), and around 170 hp (127 kW). The fourth generation was the last generation of Ranger sold in North America, replaced by the 600 series following its discontinuation after the 2004 model year.

Production of the Japanese models began tapering off in 2002 (export models and special use versions continued to be manufactured until 2004 at least).

The fourth generation Ranger was not sold in Indonesia, since the third generation was manufactured locally until 2003. From 1998 to 2003, the fourth generation Ranger was manufactured under license by Kia Motors and sold as the second generation Kia Rhino in South Korea.

== Fifth generation (2001–present) ==
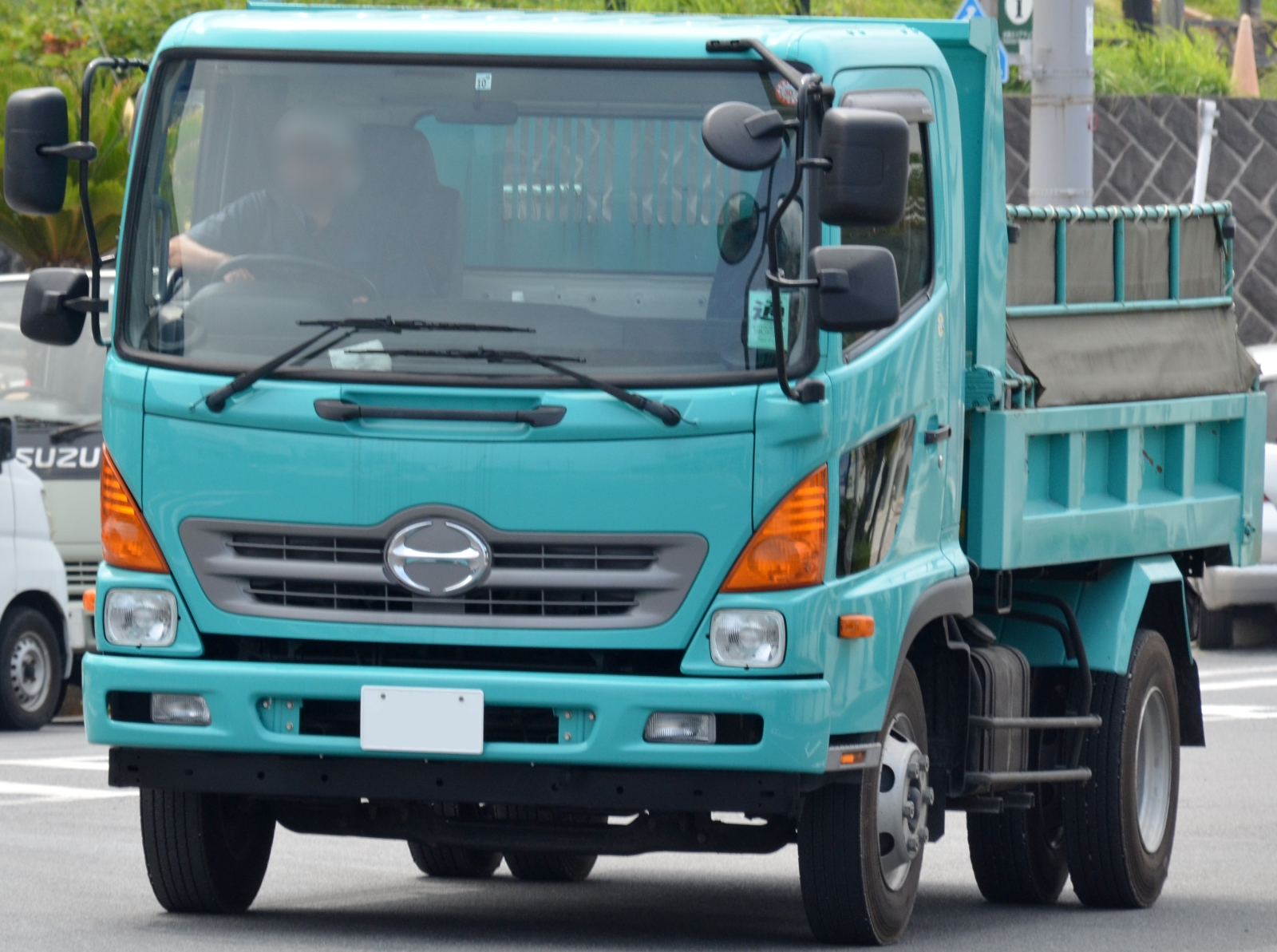
Hino Ranger FC in Japan

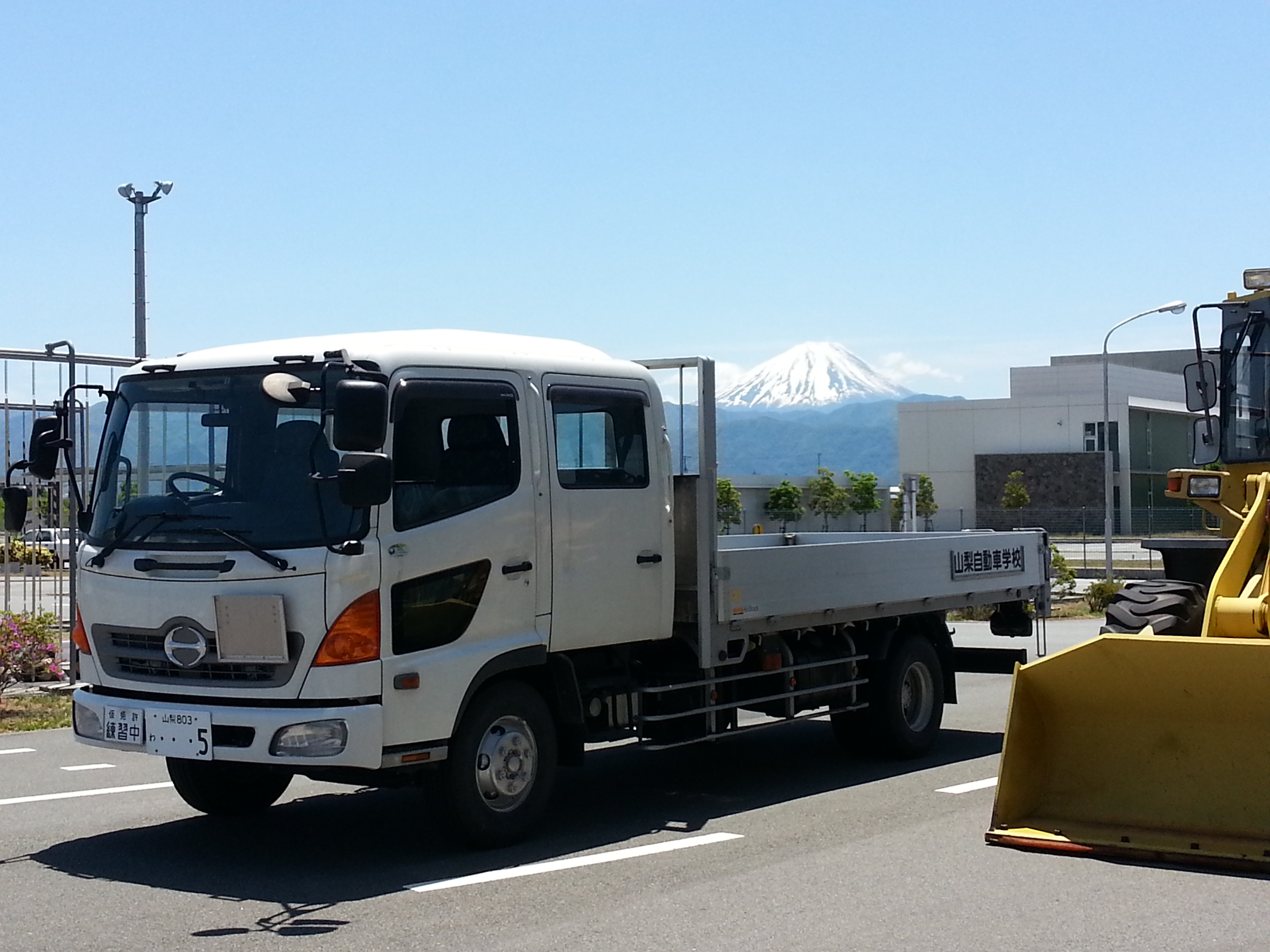
Hino Ranger GD double cab in Japan

The 5th generation Ranger was marketed in Japan as the Ranger Pro, or Hino 500 Series for export. In Indonesia, the locally manufactured models are continued to use Super Ranger and Jumbo Ranger names. In Malaysia, it was called Validus. The Ranger series was marketed as the Hino Mega in Thailand. The light-duty fourth-generation FA and FB models sold in some markets were discontinued with this generation and replaced by the 300 Series or light-duty versions of the 600 Series.

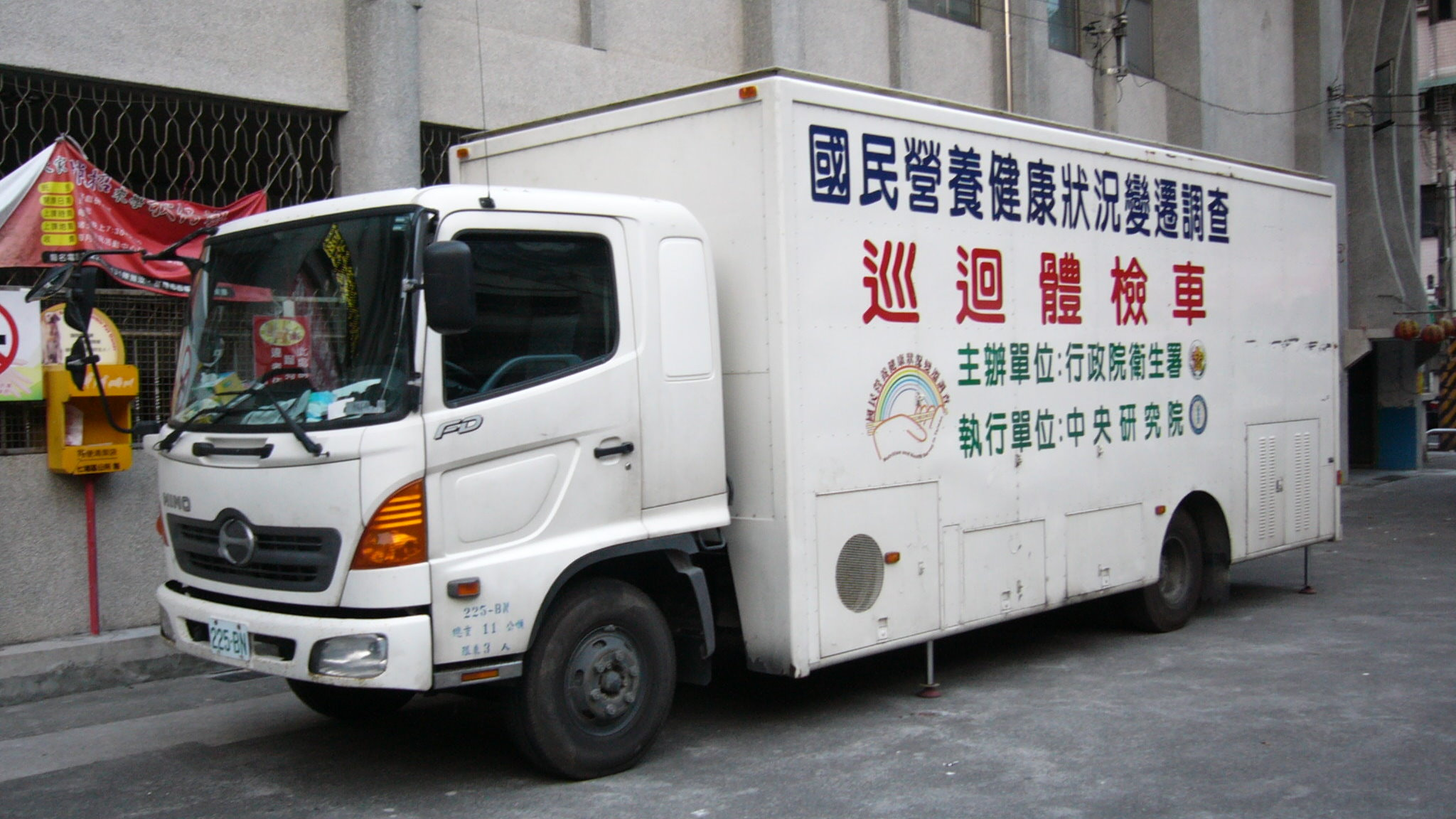
Hino 500 FD in Taiwan

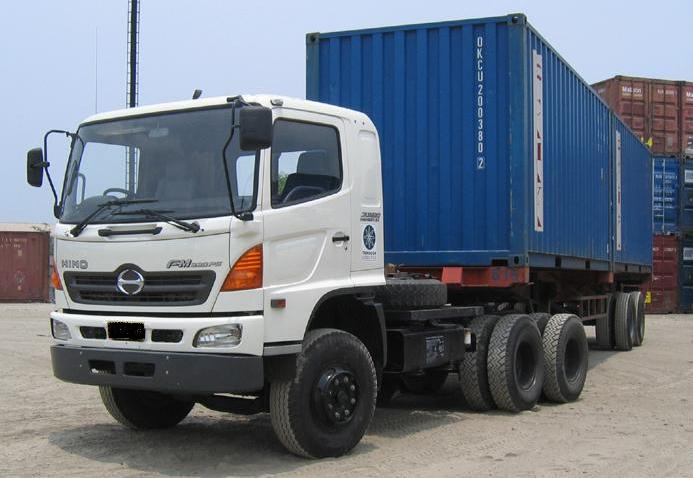
Hino Jumbo Ranger FM Tractor Head in Indonesia

In Australia, the Ranger was marketed as the "Ranger Pro" until 2008. Afterwards, it was sold as the Hino 500 with new engines and transmission choices.

The Ranger was available with combination of various cabins, standard or wide, standard roof or high roof, short cab or full cab. The FD and GD were also available as Double Cab.

A High Grade Package with chrome bumper, discharge headlights, wood panel, and other interior upgrades is offered in the Japanese Domestic Market.

- Light Medium Truck: FC, FD, GD, FE
- Medium Heavy Truck 4x2: FG, FJ, GH
- Medium Truck 4x4: FT, FX, GT, GX
- Medium Heavy Truck 6x2: FL
- Medium Heavy Truck 6x4: GK, FM
- Medium Heavy Truck 8x4: GY
- Tractor Head 4x2: SG
- Tractor Head 6x2: SG
- Tractor Head 6x4: FM

A diesel hybrid-electric version is also available in Japan.

== Sixth generation (2015–present) ==
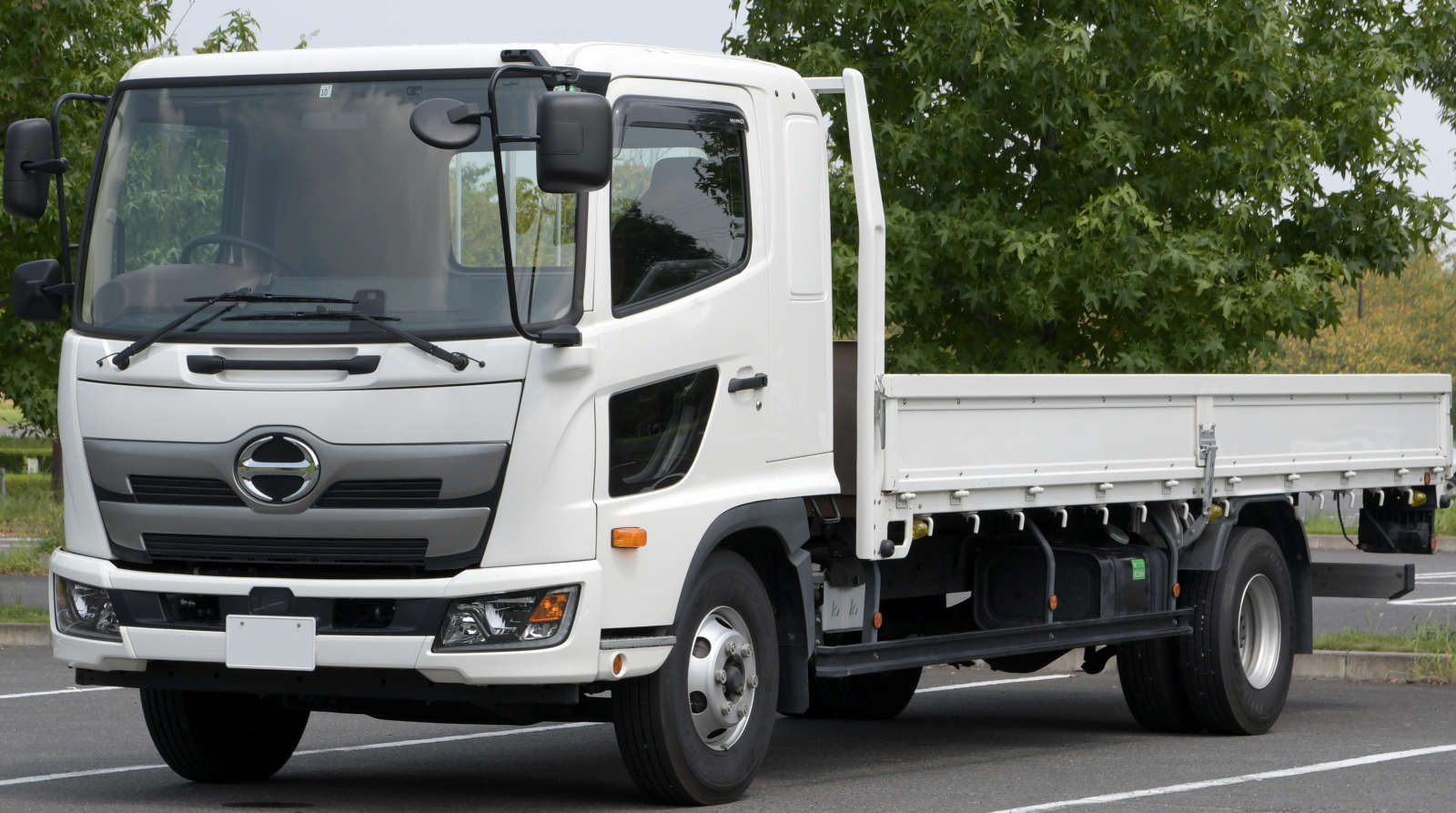
Hino Ranger FD (Japan)

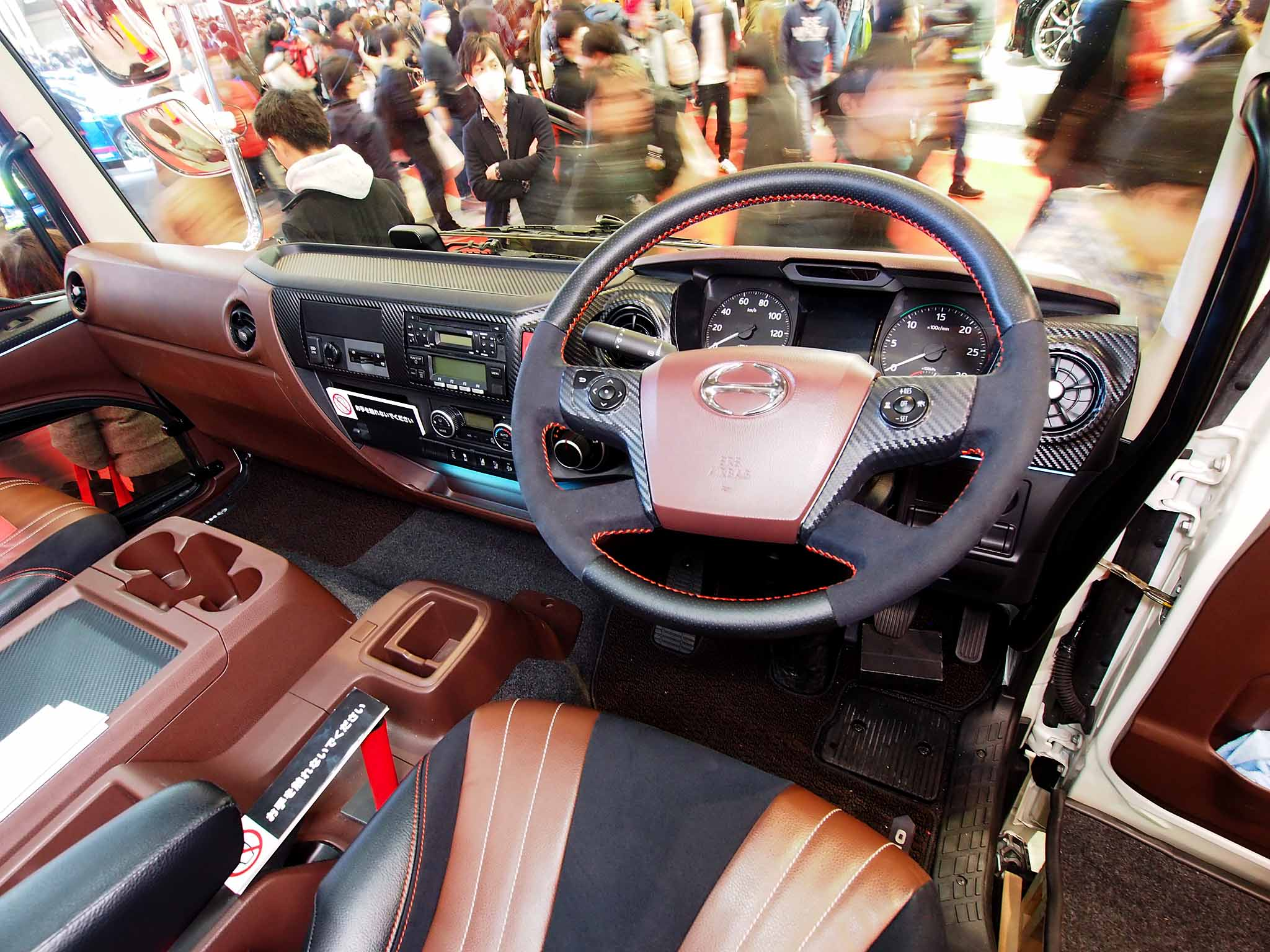
Interior

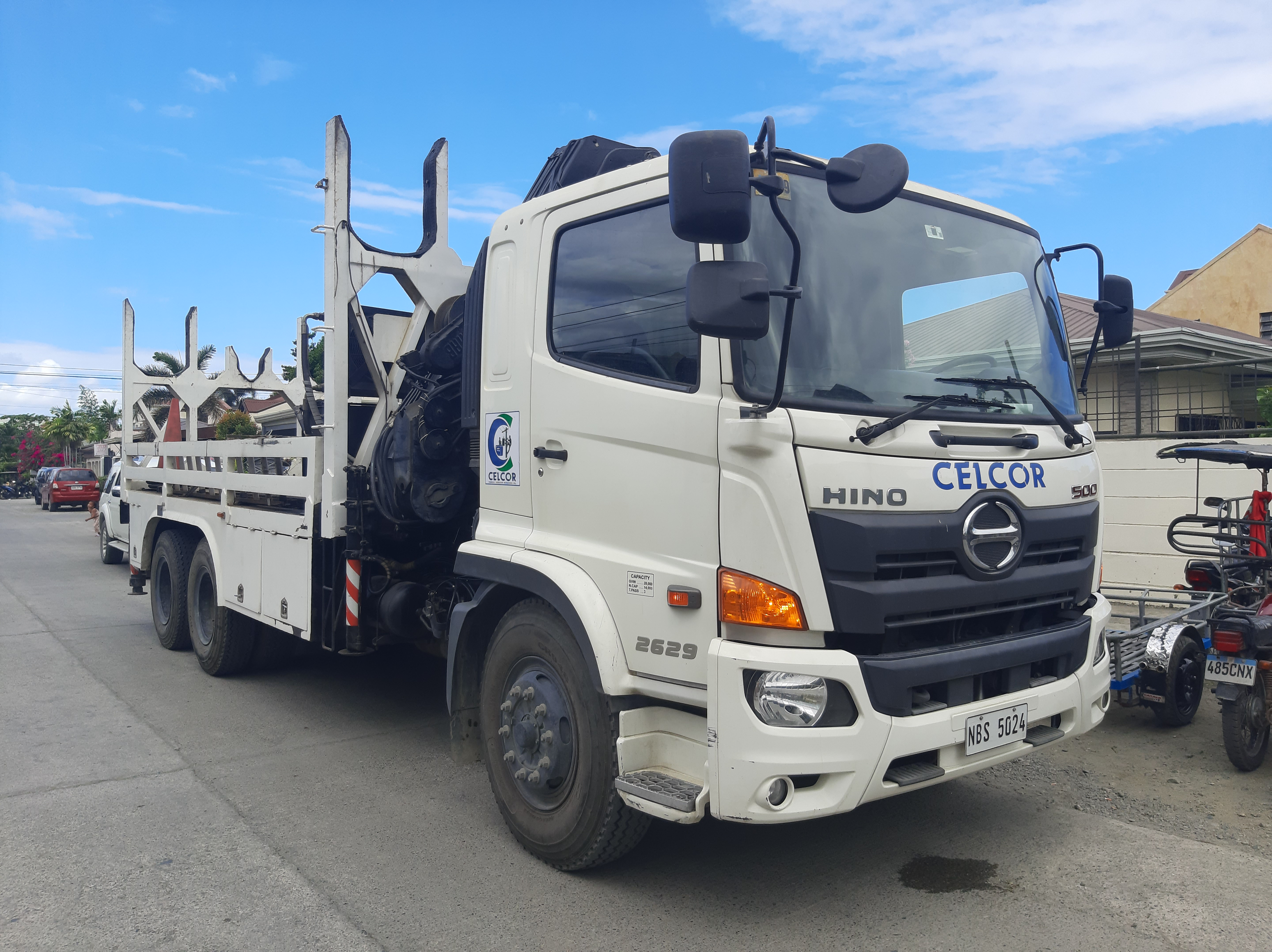
Export version of the Hino Ranger

Some minor changes were introduced on January 15, 2015. The New Hino Ranger Series now has a new look with a refreshed upside-down trapezoidal shape front grill with dark grey color, new headlamp, semi-floating suspension, and revised chassis. Besides that, there is a minor upgrade on the axles – all of the New Hino Ranger Series now uses 10 wheel studs instead of the usually found 8 wheel studs in previous generations. This 10-wheel-stud design is not new to Hino because some heavy-duty series Hino Ranger, usually the cement mixer version, had already used this design several years before. However, since 2015, the 10-wheel-stud design is now a standard feature for all Hino Ranger Series.

In April 2017, this facelifted version was revealed along with the facelifted Profia. The exterior has been redesigned with a brand's trapezoidal shape grille, new headlamps, and a unique stylish bumper. The interior has also completely redesigned with a new dashboard comprising a 4-spoke steering wheel, a 7-inch Multi Information Display (MID) and a selection of options. The MID is also equipped with hands free function and Bluetooth connectivity with On-board failure diagnostic device (J-OBDII). The new Ranger mid-cycle update also debuts the all-new 5.1-liter A05C engine that replaces both J05E and J08E engines. Transmissions should continue to with manual (6-speed or 7-speed), Allison automatic (6-speed) and Pro Shift semi automatic (6-speed or 7-speed). Sales began in Japan later in 2017.

- Light Medium Truck: FC, FD, GC, GD, FE
- Medium Heavy Truck 4x2: FG, FJ, GH
- Medium Truck 4x4: FT, FX, GT, GX
- Medium Heavy Truck 6x2: FL
- Medium Heavy Truck 6x4: GK, FM
- Medium Heavy Truck 8x2: FLX
- Medium Heavy Truck 8x4: GY
- Tractor Head 4x2: SG
- Tractor Head 6x2: SG
- Tractor Head 6x4: FM

== Motorsports ==
The Ranger made its motorsport debut in 1991 through its introduction into the Dakar Rally. In 1997, the Rangers entered by the factory backed Hino team finished the Dakar Rally in 1-2-3 positions. The Ranger would dominate the 10-liter class until 2002 when it was abolished. After the reinstating of the class in 2005, the Ranger won in its class in the 2005 season and held another class win in the 2007 season. The Ranger would then go on to take back to back wins between 2010 and 2020.

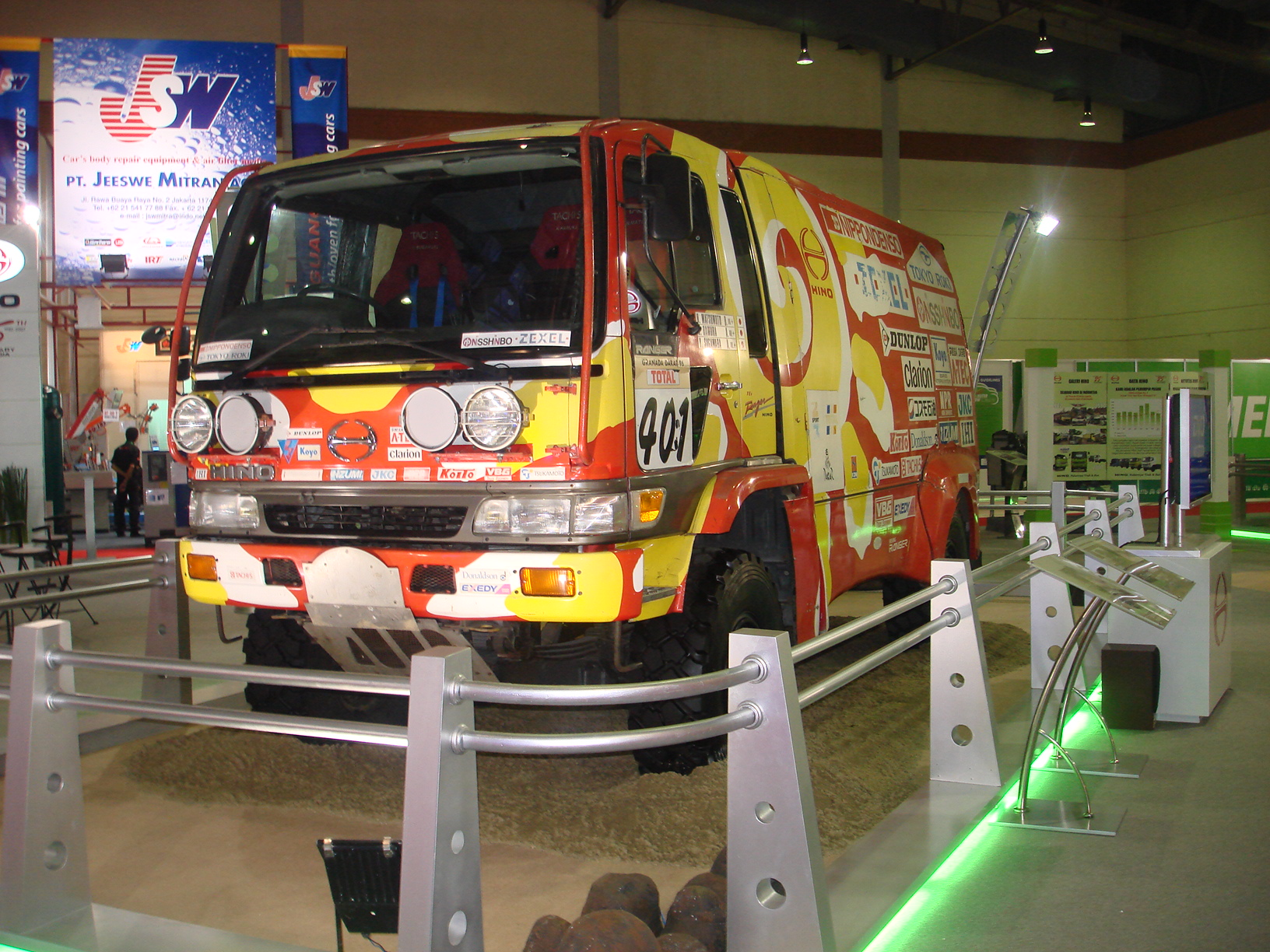
The Dakar Rally-winning Ranger FT97 on display

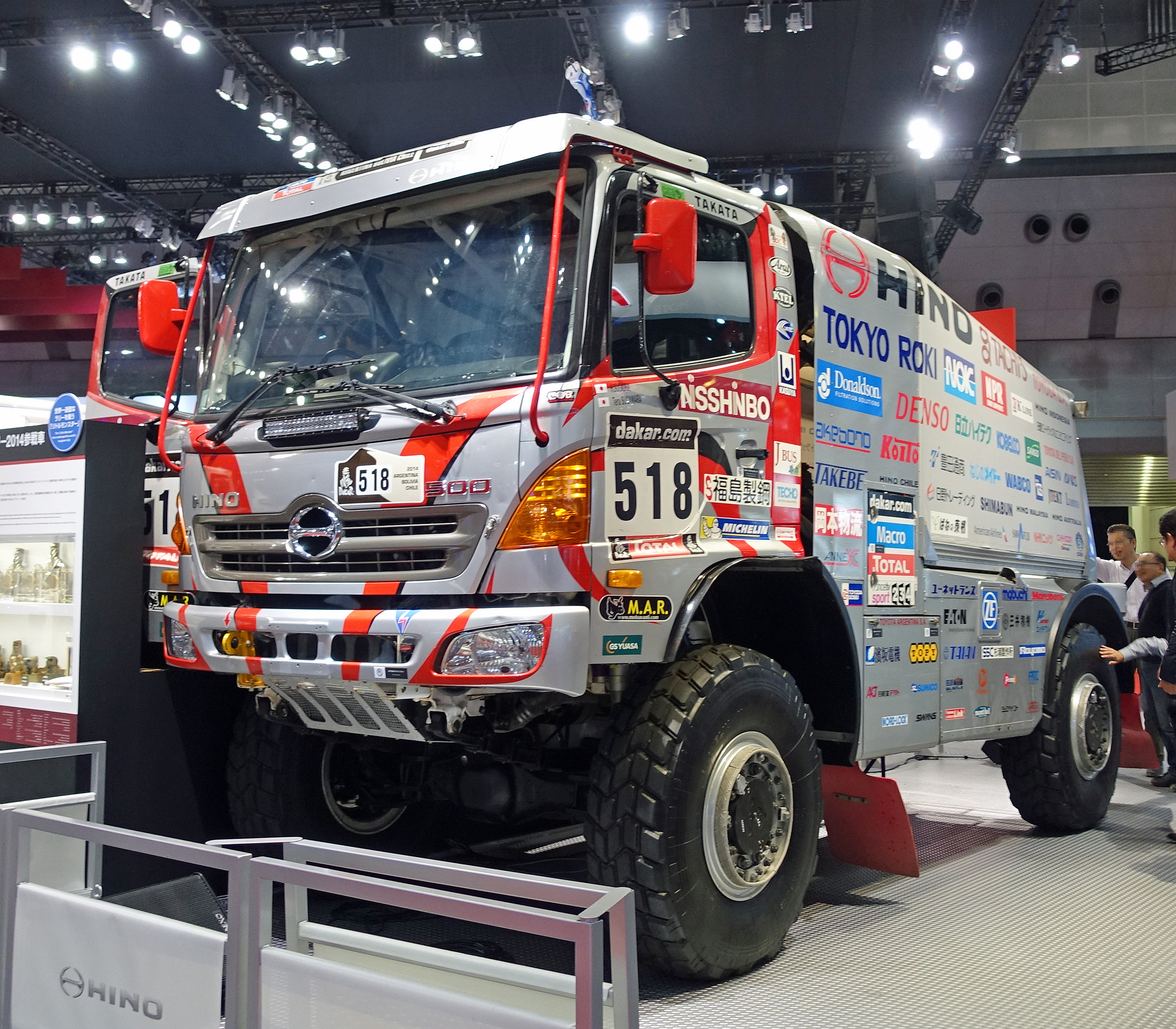
The Hino Ranger Dakar Truck of Team-Sugawara

Hino Ranger 2018 Dakar Rally of Hino Team Sugawara on display

== See also ==
- List of hybrid vehicles
