= Iveco T-series =

Iveco N/NC/T/Turbo
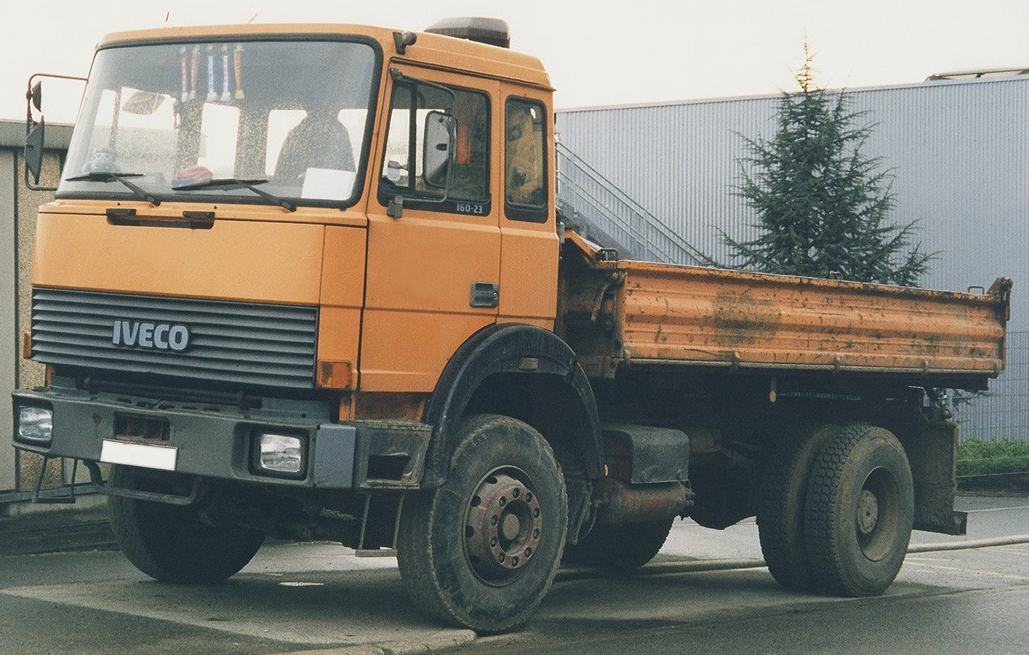
- Iveco 160-23

Overview
- Manufacturer: Fiat V.I./Iveco
- Also called: Fiat 170/190
- Production: 1975–1990
- Assembly: Turin, Italy (Fiat, Iveco); Ulm, Germany (Magirus-Deutz, Iveco); Trappes, France (UNIC, Iveco)

Body and chassis
- Class: Medium-duty truck Heavy-duty truck

Chronology
- Predecessor: Fiat 619
- Successor: Iveco Turbostar; Iveco TurboTech

The Iveco T-series is a medium to heavy-duty truck model produced by the Italian manufacturer Iveco, although it used the squared-off H-series cab originally introduced by Fiat in 1970. The truck was badged as an Iveco Fiat from 1975 and by 1980 the "Fiat" portion had been dropped entirely. A lighter duty range called the M-series was added in mid-1984, replacing the long defunct Fiat 130NC.

== Development ==
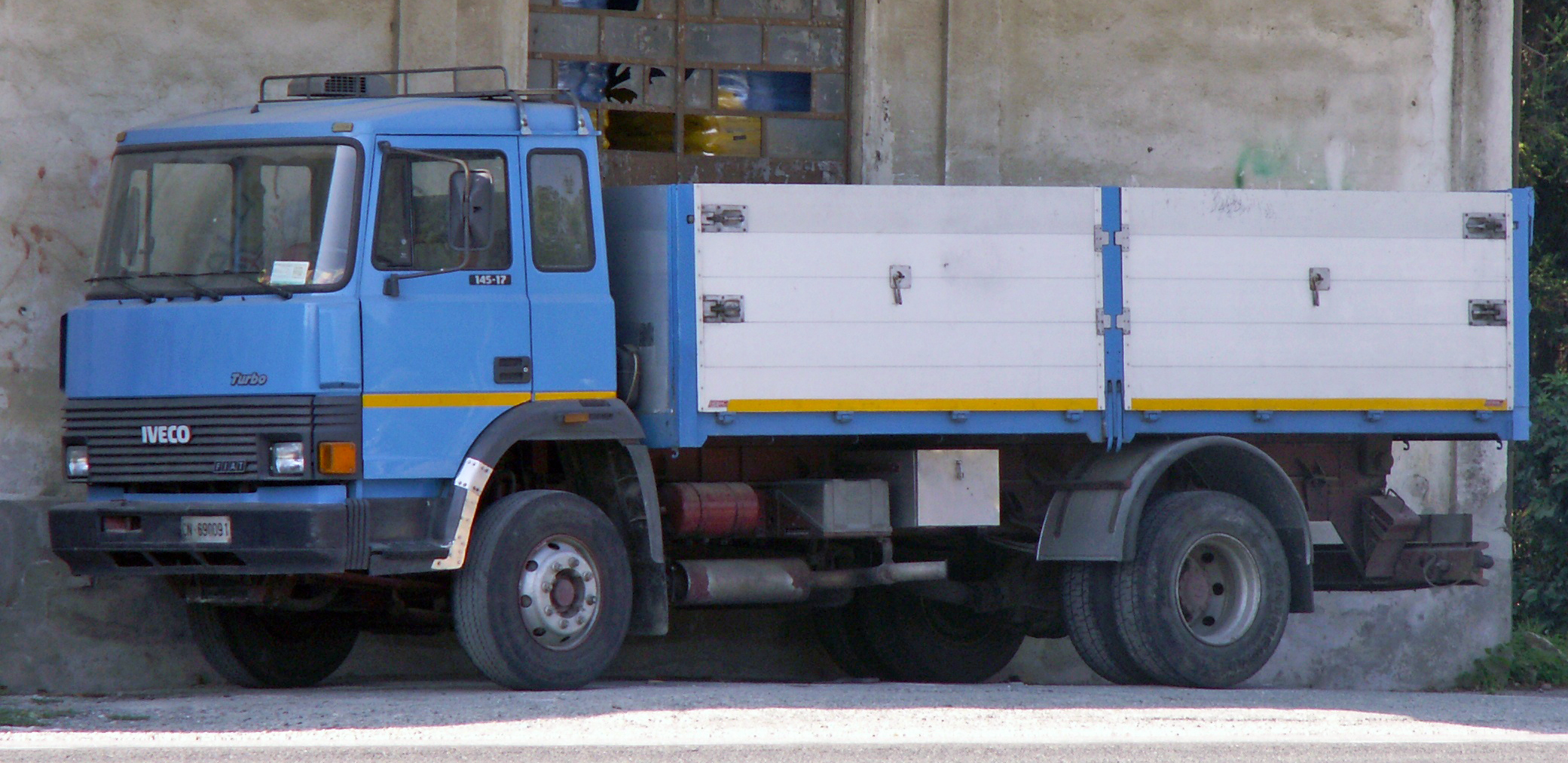
Late eighties Iveco 145-17 Turbo middleweight

It was originally sold with either Fiat or OM badging, with a number indicating the gross tonnage (170-190). The cab was the same as had been used on the Fiat 619N1, introduced in 1970, with some differences at the front. The truck was offered with two engine options, six cylinder and V8 diesels, with a peak performance of 330 hp (243 kW).

Lighter-duty versions were also offered, such as the 110 and 135. These light duty trucks were powered by in line six engines capable of producing 210 hp (154 kW), available in four different wheelbase options and also tractive unit.

Aside from Fiat and Iveco badges, UNIC and Magirus badges were also used to aid sales in markets where those badges had more resonance.

As turbodiesels were introduced, models thus equipped became known as the Iveco Turbo.

== Middle-weight models ==
In 1984 the medium-range models received a new cab. The new version was more aerodynamic, with some new panels up front. The grille, bumpers, wings, steps, and some other details were now plastic. The redesigned door handles were mounted flush in the doors. The 135.14 and the 135.17 were set apart by the installation of a turbocharger. Iveco's 5.5-liter 8060 inline-six engine thus offered either 135 or 168 hp (101 or 125 kW; 137 or 170 PS) supported by a ZF 6-speed gearbox, the top variant could achieve a top speed of 108 km/h (67 mph). Smaller trucks, up to the 145, had their headlights mounted in the grille, while larger models had them in the bumper (165 and up). The platform was available in five different wheelbase options.

The middle range Iveco 159 and 180 arrived in 1986, replacing the existing Fiat 160 range. In 1987, the Deutz-engined (air-cooled).

== Latin America ==
This model was built as the Iveco 150 in Argentina from 1986 until 1997. There were also heavier duty 190-series models, as well as the more powerful 190.33. The 150 had a turbocharged 5.8-liter inline-six diesel engine.

== Gallery ==
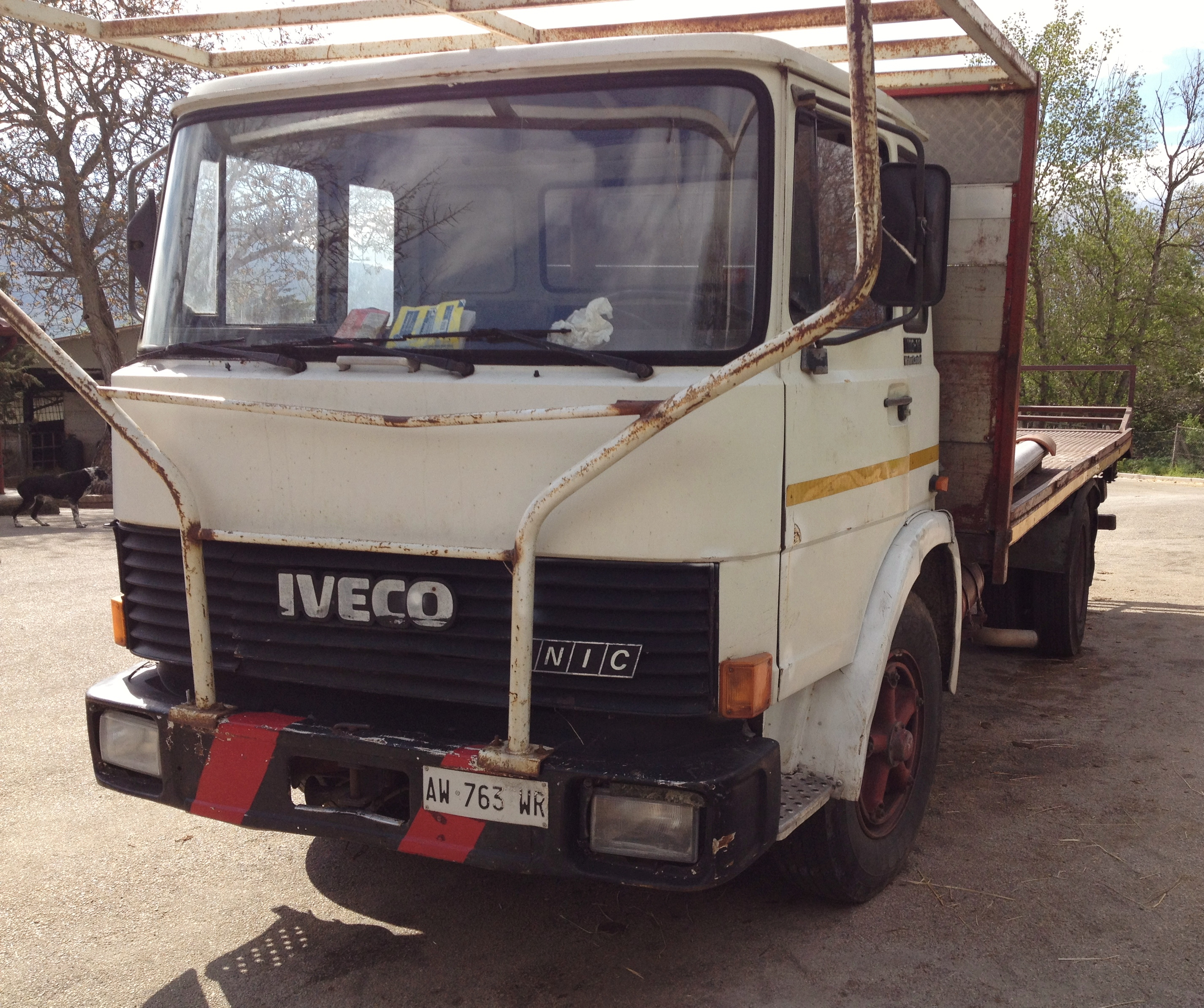
Iveco UNIC 110-14 (France)

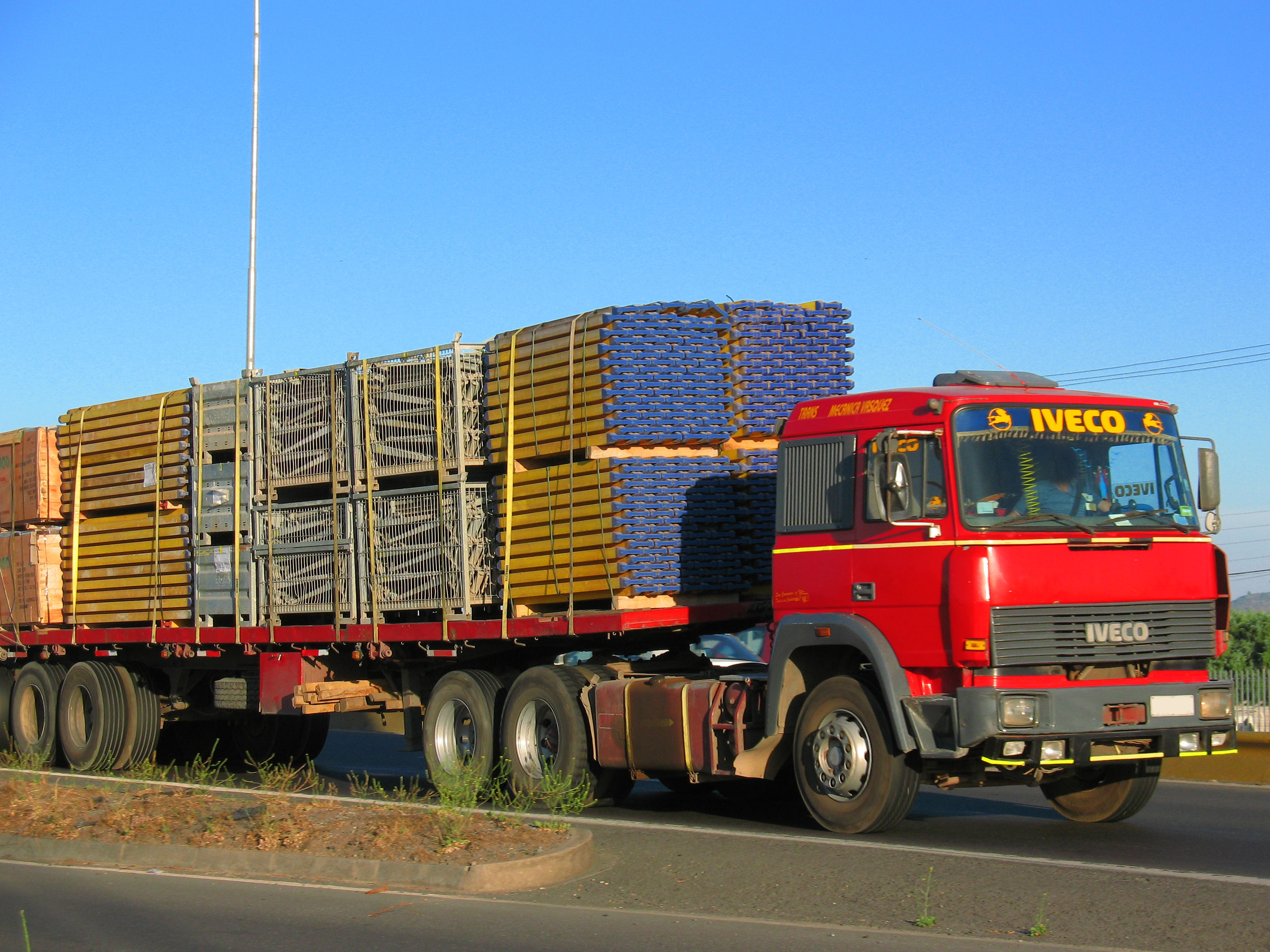
Iveco 190-30 TurboTech (1992)

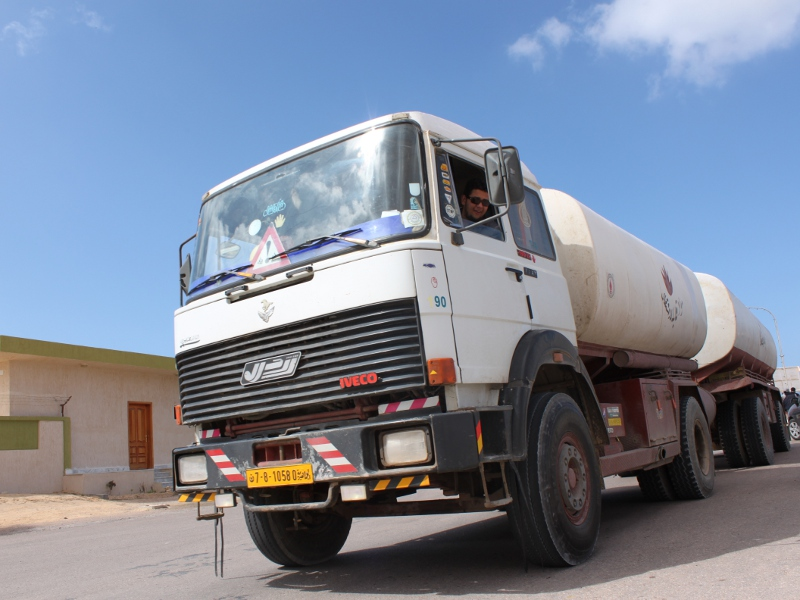
An Iveco Turbo, license-built by TBCo (Libya)
