= SCV Srl =

Italian light truck manufacturer

SCV S.r.l.
- Type: Subsidiary of CERTINA Holding AG
- Industry: Manufacturing
- Founded: 1995
- Headquarters: Varese, Italy
- Products: Commercial vehicles,
- Website: SCV srl.

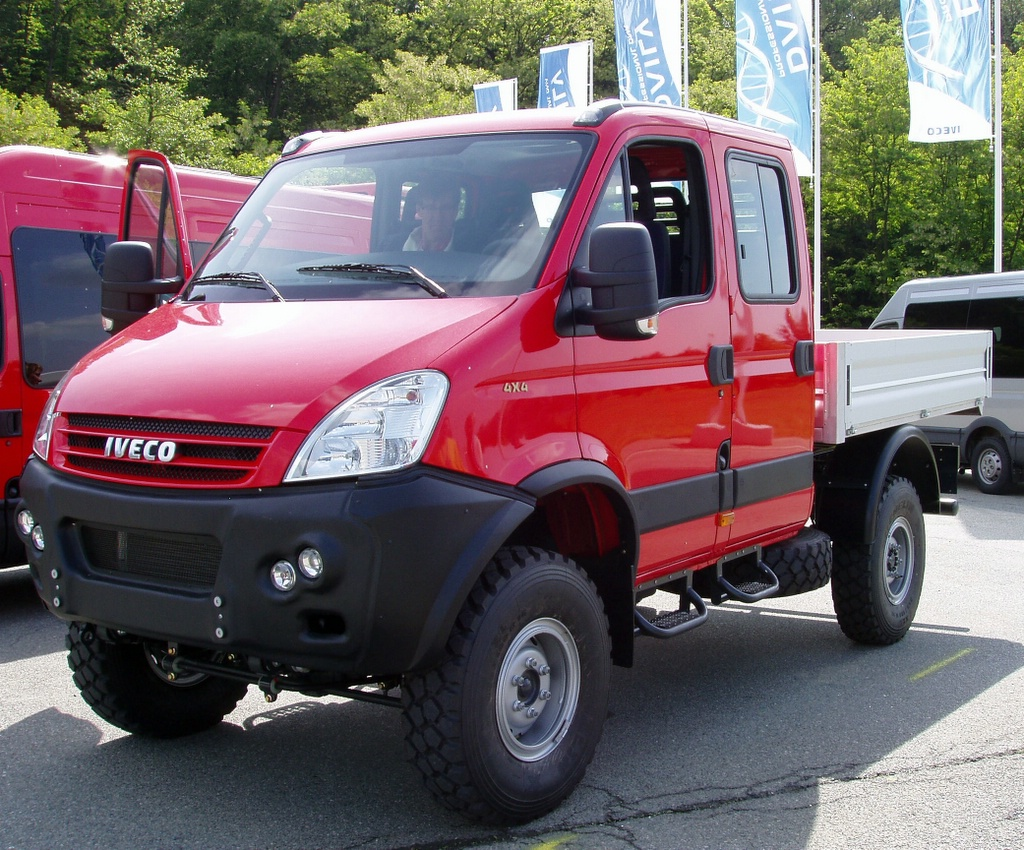
SCAM 4X4

SCV Srl (formerly 'SCAM srl') is an Italian light truck manufacturer and modifier. SCV has been partnered with Iveco from the start, SCV/SCAM builds vehicles using the Iveco Daily as a base. They produce special vehicles for markets where climatic conditions require the use of engines type Euro3. SCV/SCAM vehicles are primarily marketed to military, government, and municipal customers.

SCAM srl changed its name to SCV srl in 2017.

== Products ==
SCAM produces vehicles, transfer cases, and Superstructures which can be installed on Iveco Dailys.

=== Vehicles ===
All SCV/SCAM vehicles are 4x4 with right- or left-hand drive, and are available with 3.5 tons and 5.5 tons chassis (chassis or crew cab). A 7.5 ton version was in development in the mid-2010s. Available models are based on the Iveco Daily Van, cabin cruiser, Combi, Minibus, Agile (with automatic gearbox), and CNG, most in all-wheel-drive. Also available is a cowl chassis i.e. the frame with drivetrain but without cab for special applications.

=== Superstructures ===
Emergency services

- Firefighting (fixed and demountable) equipment from 400 to 1500 l
- Mobile offices
- Rescue trucks
- Ambulances

Business

- Aerial lifts
- Cranes
- Fixed and tipping platforms (with structure in alu and canvas)
- Snow removal vehicles with blades, salt spreaders, plows
- Radio communication vehicles

Defence

- Personnel carrier
- Logistic and support vehicles
- Armoured vehicles

Recreation

- Campers
- Minibus

=== Transfer cases ===
SCAM produces its own proprietary transfer cases with 12 or 24 gears.

== See also ==
- Bremach another Italian 4x4 manufacturer.
- Unimog German 4x4 manufacturer.
