= Toyota Type 73 medium truck =

All-terrain four-wheel drive (4x4) truck

Type 73 medium truck 2nd gen.
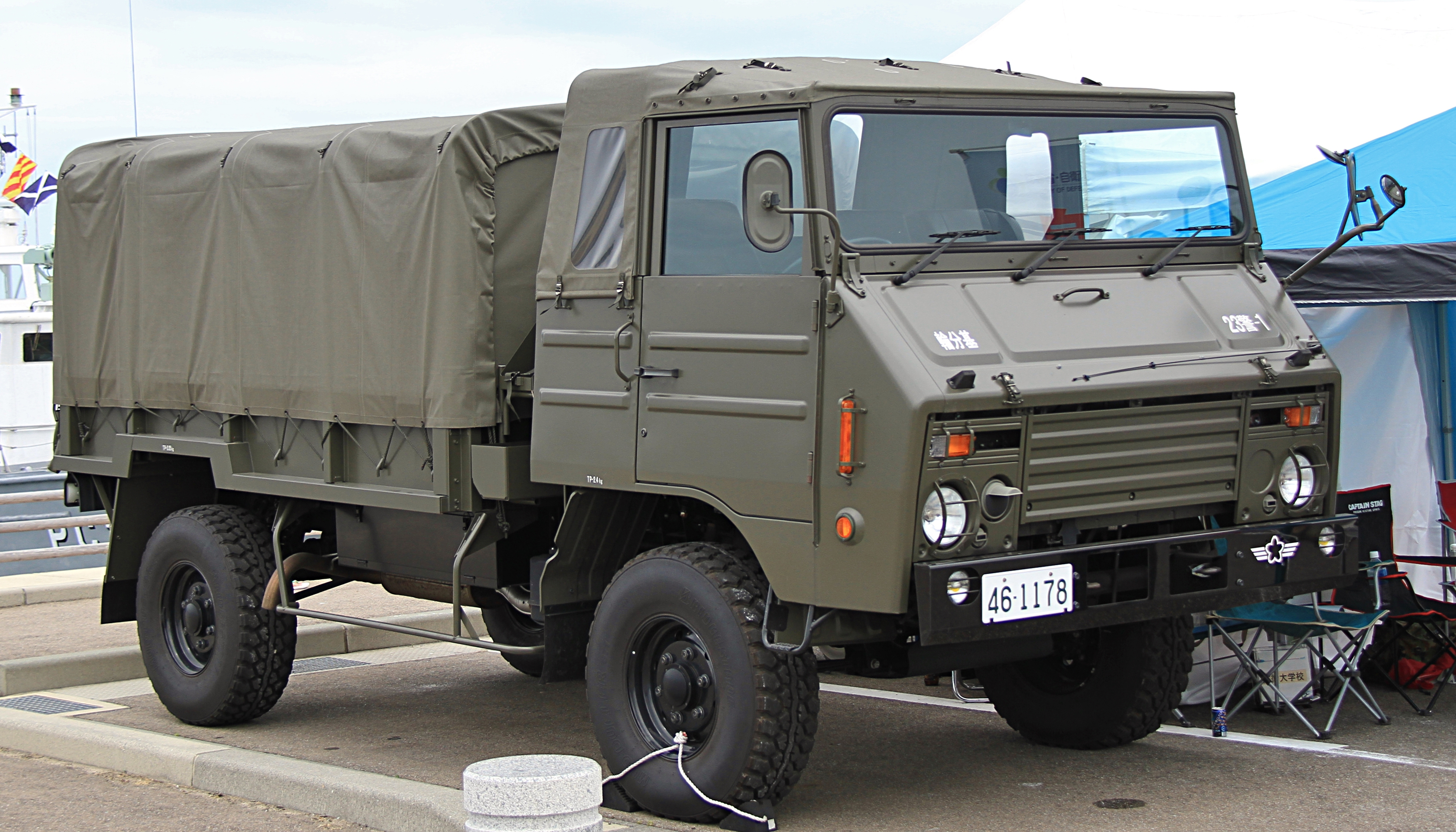
- Type 73 medium truck (second generation)
- Type: Four-wheel drive truck
- Place of origin: Japan

Production history
- Designed: 1973
- Manufacturer: Toyota

Specifications
- Armor: none

The Type 73 medium truck is an all-terrain four-wheel-drive (4x4) truck of the Japan Ground Self-Defense Force known as the 1 1/2 ton truck.

== History ==
Type 73 medium truck 1st gen.
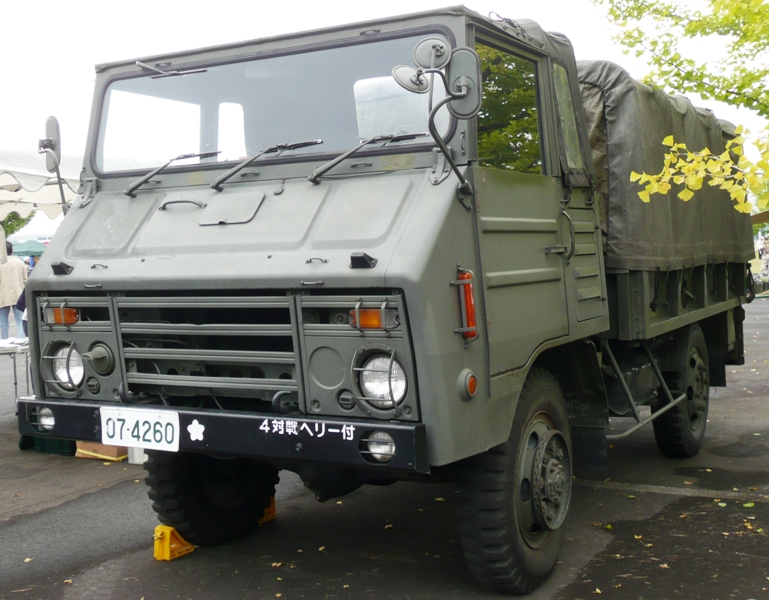
- Type 73 medium truck (first generation)

Specifications
- Mass: 3,200 kilograms (7,100 lb)
- Length: 5.36 metres (211 in)
- Width: 2.09 metres (82 in)
- Height: 2.49 metres (98 in)
- Crew: 2
- Passengers: 16
- Engine: Toyota 1W water-cooled 4-cylinder, 4,009 cc (244.6 cu in) diesel engine 86 kW (115 hp)
- Payload capacity: 2,000 kilograms (4,400 lb)
- Transmission: 5-speed manual
- Operational range: 800 km
- Maximum speed: 87 km/h

This truck replaced various types of previous light and medium trucks in service with the Japan Ground Self-Defense Force. Among them was the 3/4 ton truck manufactured by Toyota and Nissan, which had been in service since the 1950s. One of the reasons the 3/4 ton truck became obsolete, was due to the high fuel consumption of the gasoline engine. Japanese truck manufacturers were instructed to develop a successor. After competitive bidding Toyota and Hino Motors were selected to develop and build the Type 73 medium truck.

== Usage ==
The truck is not armored and thus not made for combat, but with the aim of mainly carrying personnel and transporting goods with a load capacity of 2,000 kg. It is used in various roles. The cab, which has space for the driver and one or two crew is normally fitted with a soft top and windshield which can be folded down in order to lower the silhouette . It is fitted with an all-steel cargo area, which can be covered by a heavy tarpaulin. It is equipped with two wooden personnel benches for transporting up to 16 troops. A step is integrated into the folding tailgate to assist personnel mounting the cargo area. The truck can be used to carry mortars and their crews. The infantry heavy mortar company uses it equipped with a M2 107 mm mortar. Additionally you will often find the vehicle with a box type design, such as for radio communications or as an ambulance.

== First generation ==
The first generation, produced from around 1973 to the mid-1990s, is equipped with a five-speed manual transmission, lacks power steering and bears serial numbers 0001–39XX. The truck adopted components from the civilian Hino Ranger series: A ladder-type frame, a four-wheel rigid leaf suspension, a combination of chassis configurations and the part-time four-wheel drive. It has the following capabilities for off-road use:

- Gradient 60%
- Side slope 30%
- Vertical step 0.5 m
- Trench 0.5 m
- Fording 0.8 m

== Second generation ==
Type 73 medium truck 2nd gen.
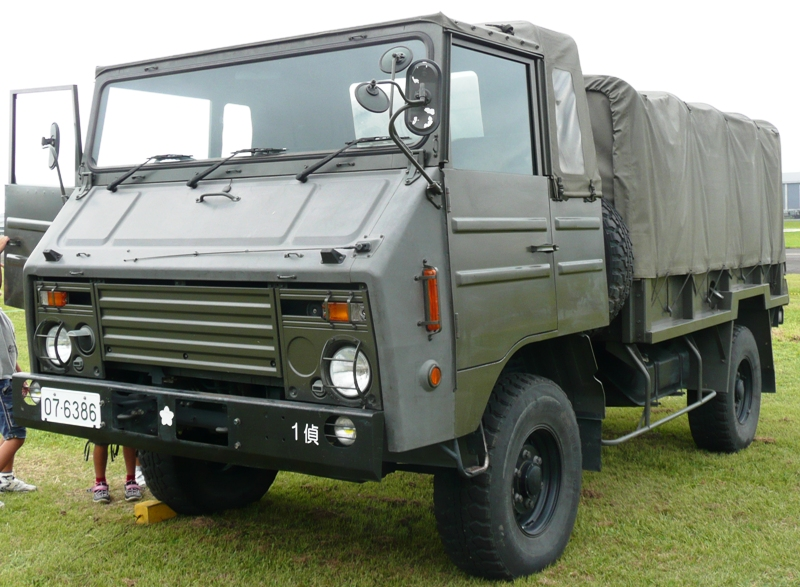
- Type 73 medium truck (second generation)

Specifications
- Mass: 3,040 kilograms (6,700 lb)
- Length: 5.49 metres (216 in)
- Width: 2.22 metres (87 in)
- Height: 2.565 metres (101.0 in)
- Crew: 3
- Passengers: 16
- Engine: Toyota water-cooled 4-cylinder diesel engine 125 kW (168 hp)
- Payload capacity: 2,000 kilograms (4,400 lb)
- Transmission: automatic
- Maximum speed: 115 km/h

The second generation, which replaced the first generation in the mid-1990s, is equipped with a four-speed automatic transmission, power steering and bears serial numbers 39XX ~ 5XXX. The following additional changes were made compared to the first generation: switch to the chassis of the Toyota high mobility vehicle. It has full-time four wheel drive with a center differential, and the cab is equipped with air conditioning and radio.

In comparison to the first generation, the front bumper shape was changed and the shape of the tail light as well as the style of the round front lights, to make the Toyota truck look similar to the high mobility vehicle. It uses the same wheels and tires as the high mobility vehicle. One of the identifying marks is the cutout for the back wheels. Compared to the high mobility vehicle the wheelbase has been shortened with good maneuverability for the cab-over shape. It does not feature four wheel steering. In addition, the radiator was lowered and the position and shape of the front radiator cover has been changed.

== Gallery ==
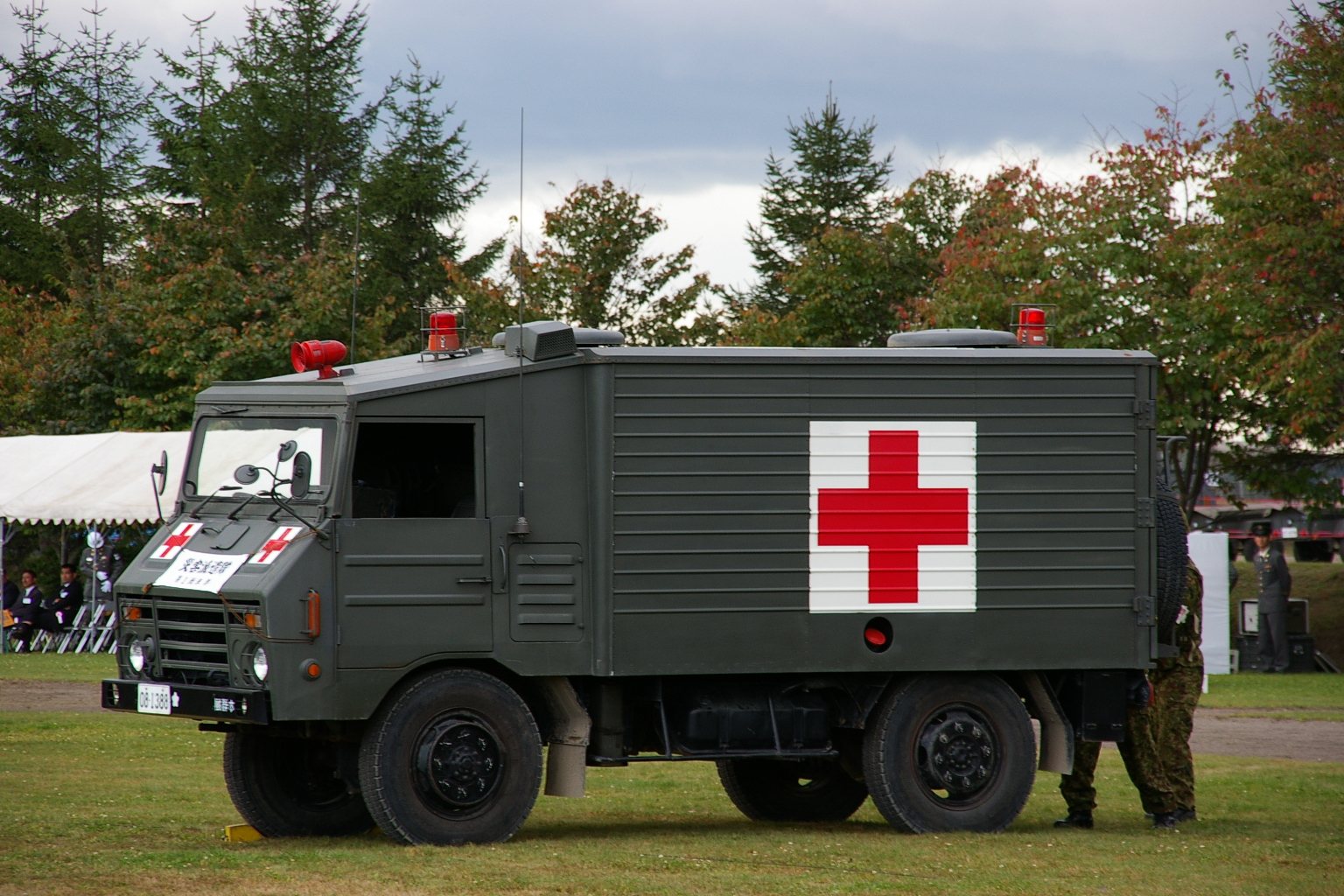
First-generation ambulance

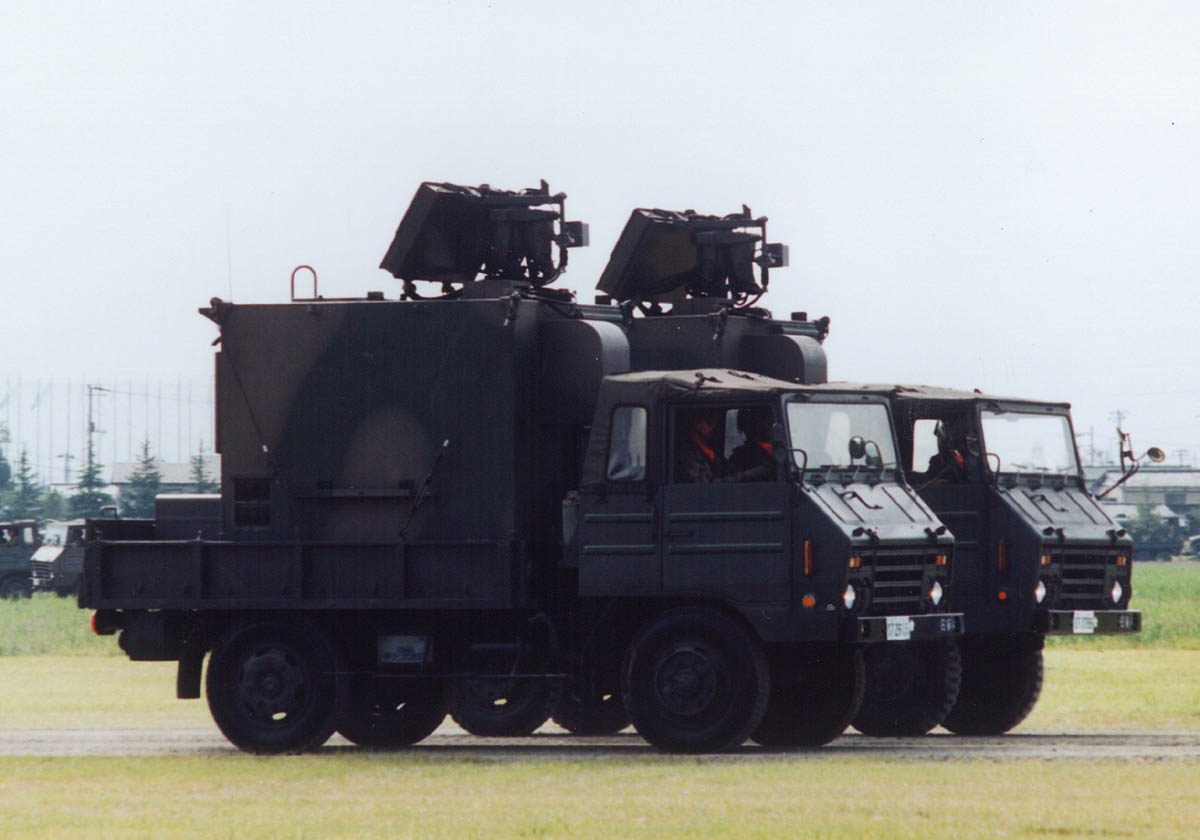
First-generation radar vehicle

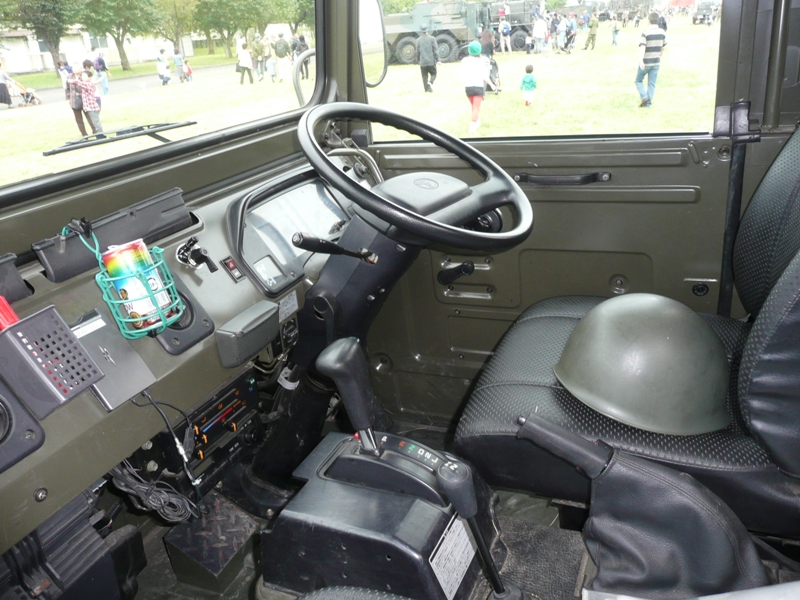
Second-generation interior

== See also ==
- Mitsubishi Type 73 light truck
- Toyota high mobility vehicle
