= Hino Dutro =

Light/medium truck manufactured by Hino Motors

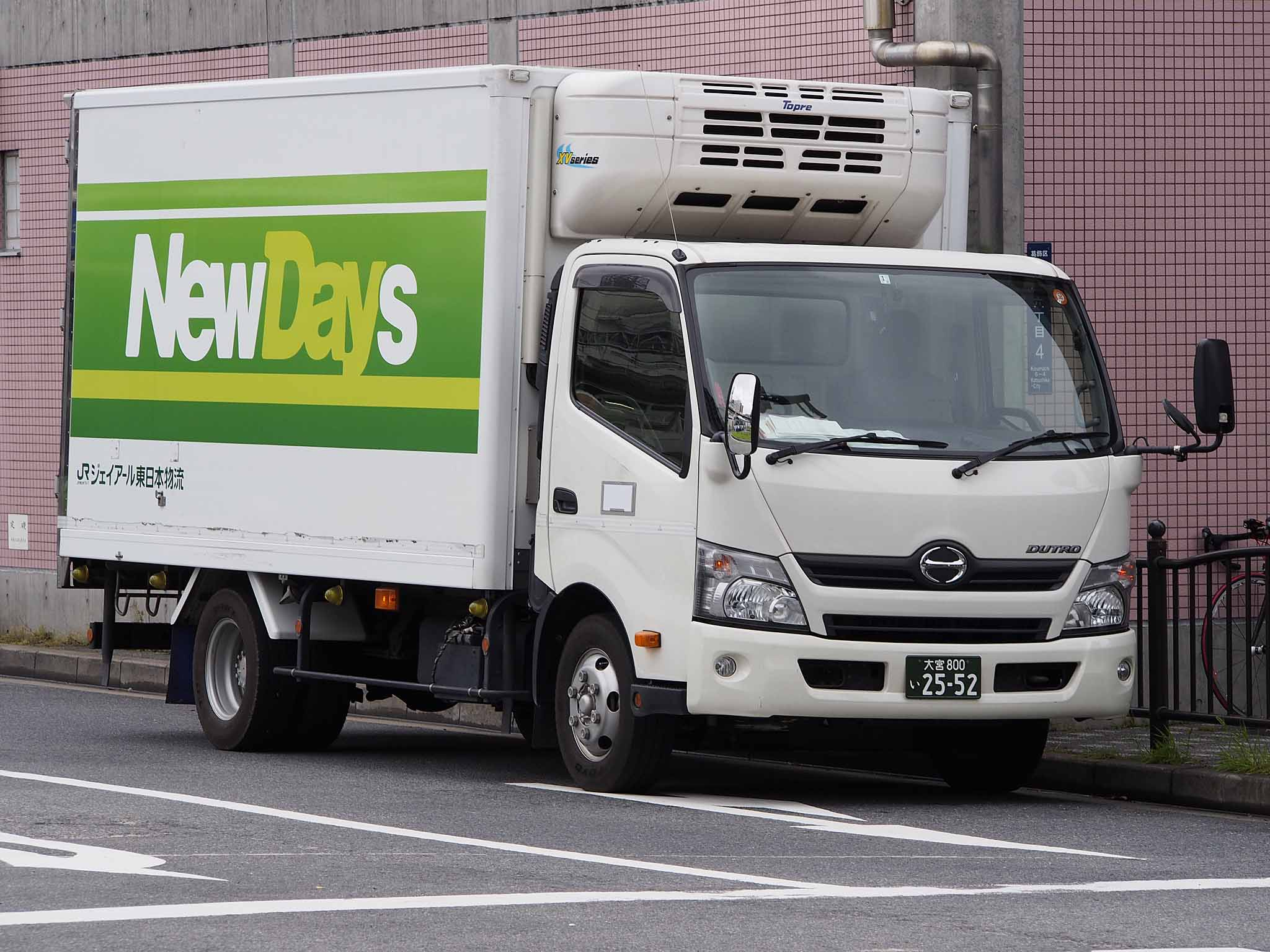
- Hino Dutro wide cab (2nd Generation) in Japan.

Overview
- Manufacturer: Hino Motors; Kuozui Motors; Toyota Motor Corporation
- Also called: Toyota Dyna; Toyota Toyoace; Hino 300/200 Series; Hino Ranger II; Hino 155/195 (North America, until 2020); Hino M-Series (North America, 2021-)
- Production: 1999–present
- Assembly: Japan: Hamura; Indonesia: Purwakarta; Malaysia: Seremban; Philippines: Calamba; Pakistan: Karachi (HinoPak Motors Ltd); Colombia: Cota (HMMC); Guatemala: Guatemala City

Body and chassis
- Class: Light truck/medium truck
- Body style: 2-door standard cab; 4-door crew cab; 2-door wide cab; 5-door van (Route Van)
- Platform: Toyota U

Powertrain
- Engine: Diesel: 2.8 L Toyota 1GD-FTV I4; 3.7 L Toyota 4B I4; 4.0 L Toyota/Hino N04C I4; 4.0 L Toyota/Hino W04D I4 (turbo-diesel); 4.1 L Toyota 15B-FTE I4; 4.6 L Toyota/Hino S05C I4; 4.7–5.3 L Toyota/Hino J05C/E I4; 4.8 L Toyota/Hino S05D I4
- Power output: 36 kW (48 hp; 49 PS) electric motor (hybrid)
- Transmission: 5-speed manual; 6-speed manual; 5-speed automatic; 6-speed automatic
- Battery: 288 V, 1.872 kWh NiMH (hybrid)

Chronology
- Predecessor: Hino Ranger 2/3
- Successor: Hino S-Series (North America)

The Hino Dutro (Japanese: 日野デュトロ) is a light commercial truck manufactured by Hino Motors. It is a rebadged version of the Toyota Dyna. The Dutro took over from the earlier Ranger 2 (and Ranger 3), a badge-engineered version of the Daihatsu Delta series. Outside of Japan, it is also known as the 300 series. In North America, it has been marketed as the 'M Series' since the 2021 model year.

The Dutro is sold in Australia (currently it is rebadged as the 300 series), Chile, Colombia, Indonesia, Malaysia, Pakistan, the Philippines, Thailand, Sri Lanka and other countries in Latin America. As of 2008, the Dutro was available in Canada as the 'Hino 155'. Canadian models are built in Woodstock, Ontario from CKD kits imported from Japan.

The Latin-American models are built in Cota, Colombia by Hino Motor Manufacturing Colombia, from CKD kits imported from Japan. In some of these markets, however, complete assembled trucks are imported from Japan. A new assembly plant is located in the town of Cota, in Colombia, built and financed by two partners: one local company and the Toyota group, the majority owner of the Hino subsidiary and the brand.

Emissions standards compliance is achieved with electronically controlled and water-cooled exhaust gas recirculation (EGR) technology which uses a variable-geometry turbocharger to quickly build up pressure in its housing.

== First generation (1999–2011) ==
The Dutro was introduced in May 1999 as a result of a joint development of the seventh Generation Toyota Dyna by Hino Motors and Toyota.

Like the Dyna and its twin ToyoAce, the first generation Dutro was offered in many different chassis type suitable for different purposes. All the standard cab models and the 4WD model wide cab XZU388 were built on the U300 platform, other wide cab models were on the U400 platform.

=== Japan ===
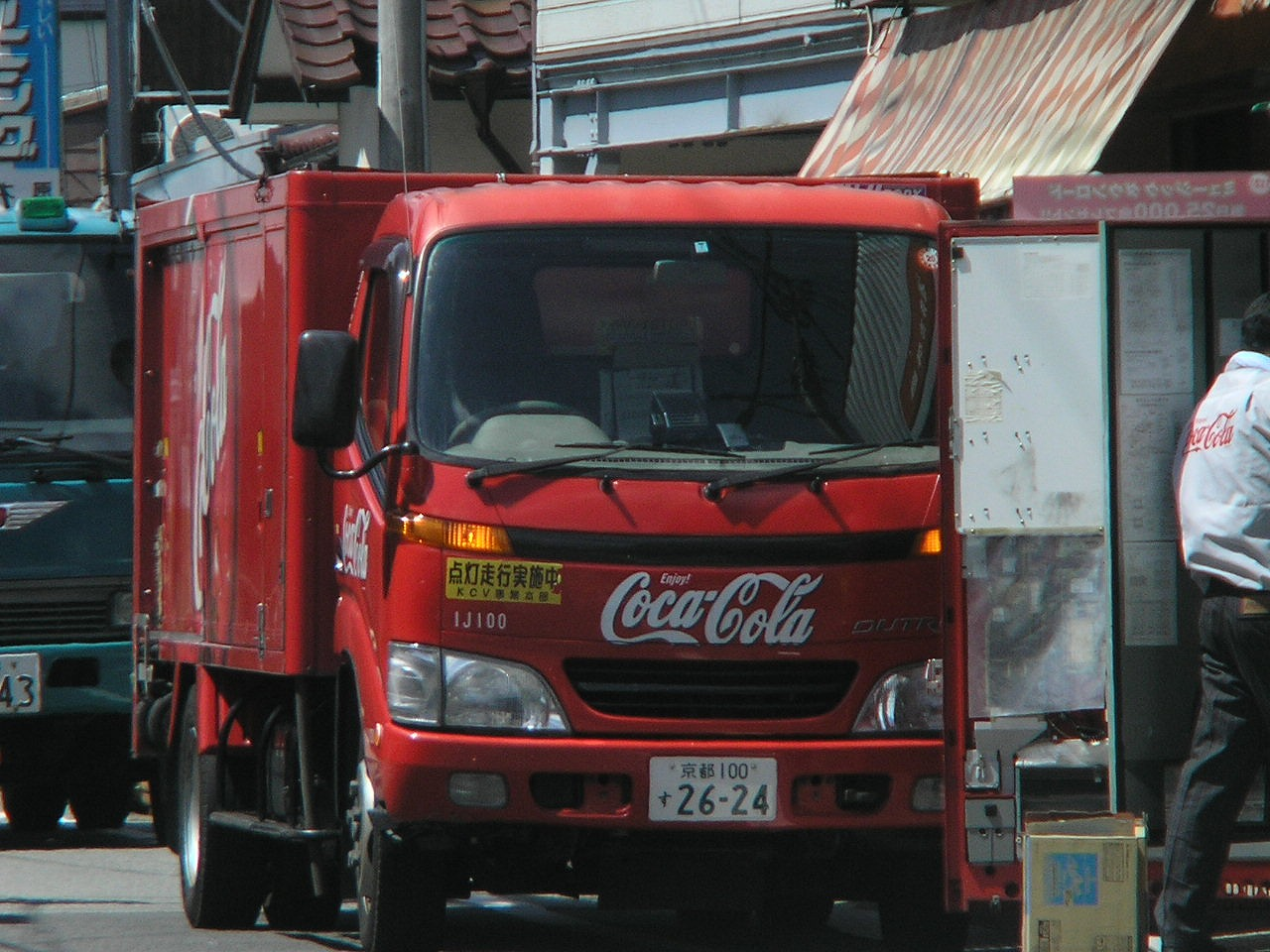
Pre-facelift Hino Dutro standard cab

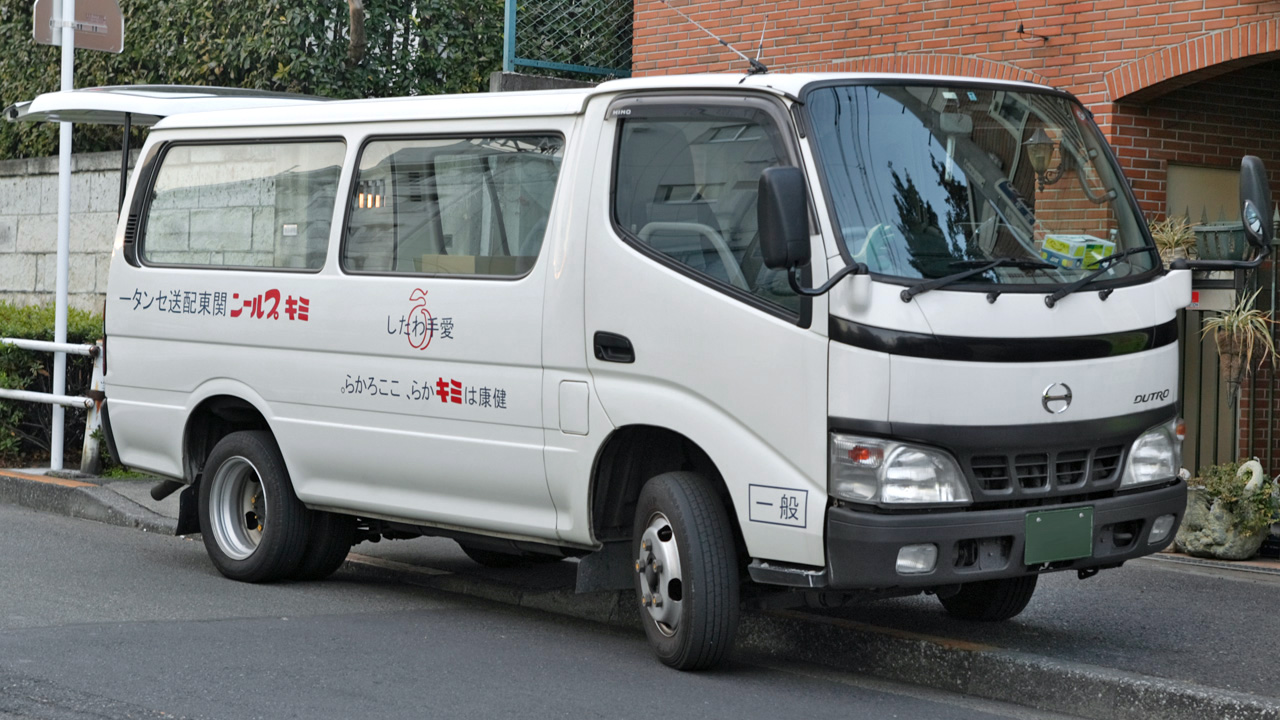
First facelift Dutro Route Van

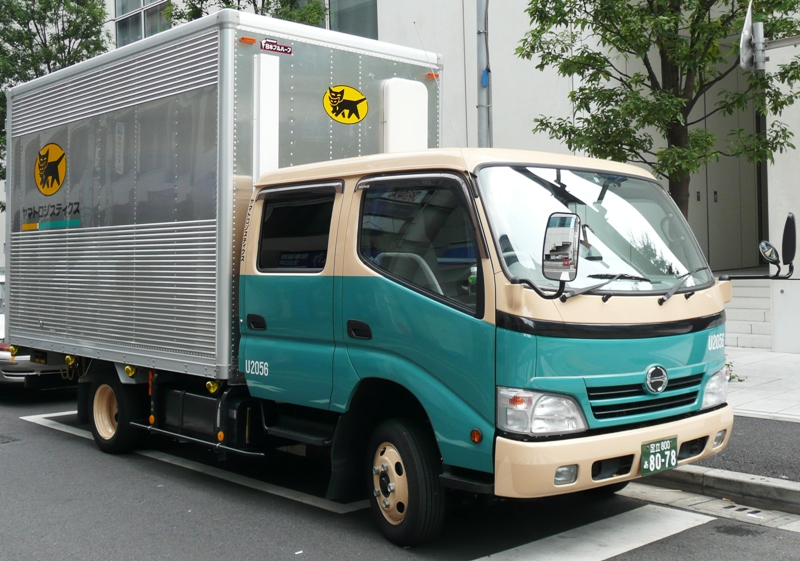
Second facelift Dutro Double Cab

- A wide range of variants of the first generation Dutro were offered in Japan, including the Wide Cab, Double Cab, hybrid electric, four-wheel-drive version, and the Route Van. Engine choices include the 3.7-litre 4B, 4.1-litre 15B-FTE, 4.0-litre N04C, 4.6-litre S05C, 4.7-litre J05D, 4.8-litre S05D, and 5.3-litre J05C.
- The cabin can be chosen from the Basic Grade, Pro Grade and Hi-Grade. The Hi-Grade package consisted of chrome grille, power mirrors, power windows, carpeted floor, wood panel on the center cluster and power window switches, manual AC, and keyless entry system.
- The Japanese Dutro was given the first facelift in June 2002. The turn signal lights now in the headlamp housings instead of the upper corner of the front panel. The grille was also restyled.

=== Export versions ===
==== Indonesia ====
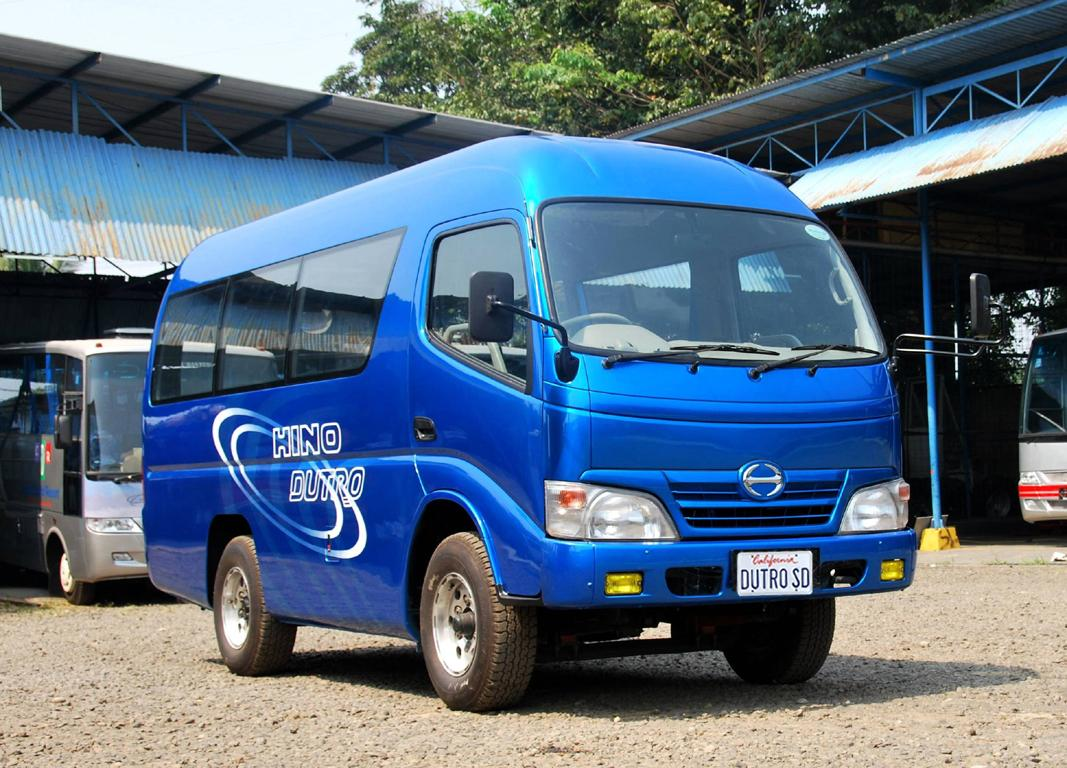
Dutro 110 SD Microbus (WU302, Indonesia)

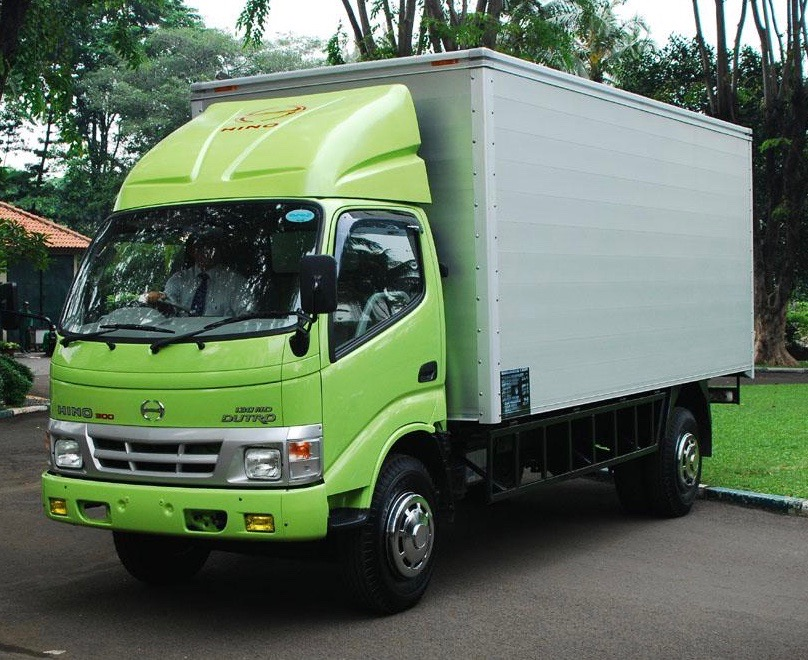
Dutro 130 MD Box (WU342, Indonesia)

- The Dutro was introduced in Indonesia in 2002. Five models were offered: 125ST, 125LT, 125HT, 140GT, and 140HT. All are Standard Cab. The 125ST is 4-wheel short wheelbase model, the rest are 6-wheel long wheelbase models. The 125 models use the 4.0 liter N04C engine, while the 140 models are powered by 4.6 liter S05C engine.
- Starting from 2007 model year, with the government requirement that all vehicles must comply with Euro-2 emission regulation, Hino introduced 4 models with the modified W04D engine with inter-cooled turbocharger. The new models are 110SD, 110LD, 130MD, and 130HD.

==== Thailand ====
- In Thailand, five models of the Dutro were offered: Dutro 300, 301, 340 (Standard Cab), 410 and 420 (Wide Cab).

==== Australia ====
The Dutro was launched to the Australian market in the year 2000. It came with standard ABS, SRS Airbags, and power windows, the features which were not available for other manufactuters' trucks at that time.

In 2007, the facelift model was officially renamed Hino 300. The 4.0-litre common-rail turbo diesel replaced the old 4.6-litre. Hino Australia offered 6 standard cab and 13 wide cab variants.

== Second generation (2011–present) ==
The second generation of the Dutro was introduced in 2011. The standard cab is built on the U600 chassis, while the wide cab is designated as U700. The exterior has been redesigned with a trapezoidal-shaped grille, projector headlamps, and a new, stylish bumper. The standard cab retains the design of the previous generation but has been upgraded with a new front appearance. In contrast, the wide cab features an entirely new design with a distinctly different fascia that sets it apart from the standard cab. It is equipped with a Front Underrun Protection System for enhanced safety and has slim A-pillars to improve visibility. Additionally, all the pillars and the roof have been reinforced for greater strength while utilizing lighter materials.

The interior has also been updated with an all-new dashboard. It features a new two-spoke steering wheel, an optional 4.2-inch Multi-Information Display (MID), and various other options. The N04 4.0-liter diesel engine remains unchanged, including both standard and full-hybrid options.

Like the previous generation, the Dutro is available in many configurations, offering choices of chassis height and wheelbase for different purposes, such as cargo, dump, tank lorry, or mixer. The Route Van, available with either a standard or high roof, is also part of the Japanese lineup.

In April 2019, the home market Dutro received a facelift, notably featuring a restyled grille and light-emitting diode (LED) headlights. The interior was upgraded with steering wheel switches and a standard 4.2-inch color Multi-Information Display (MID). The high-floor single-tire truck and Route Van were discontinued.

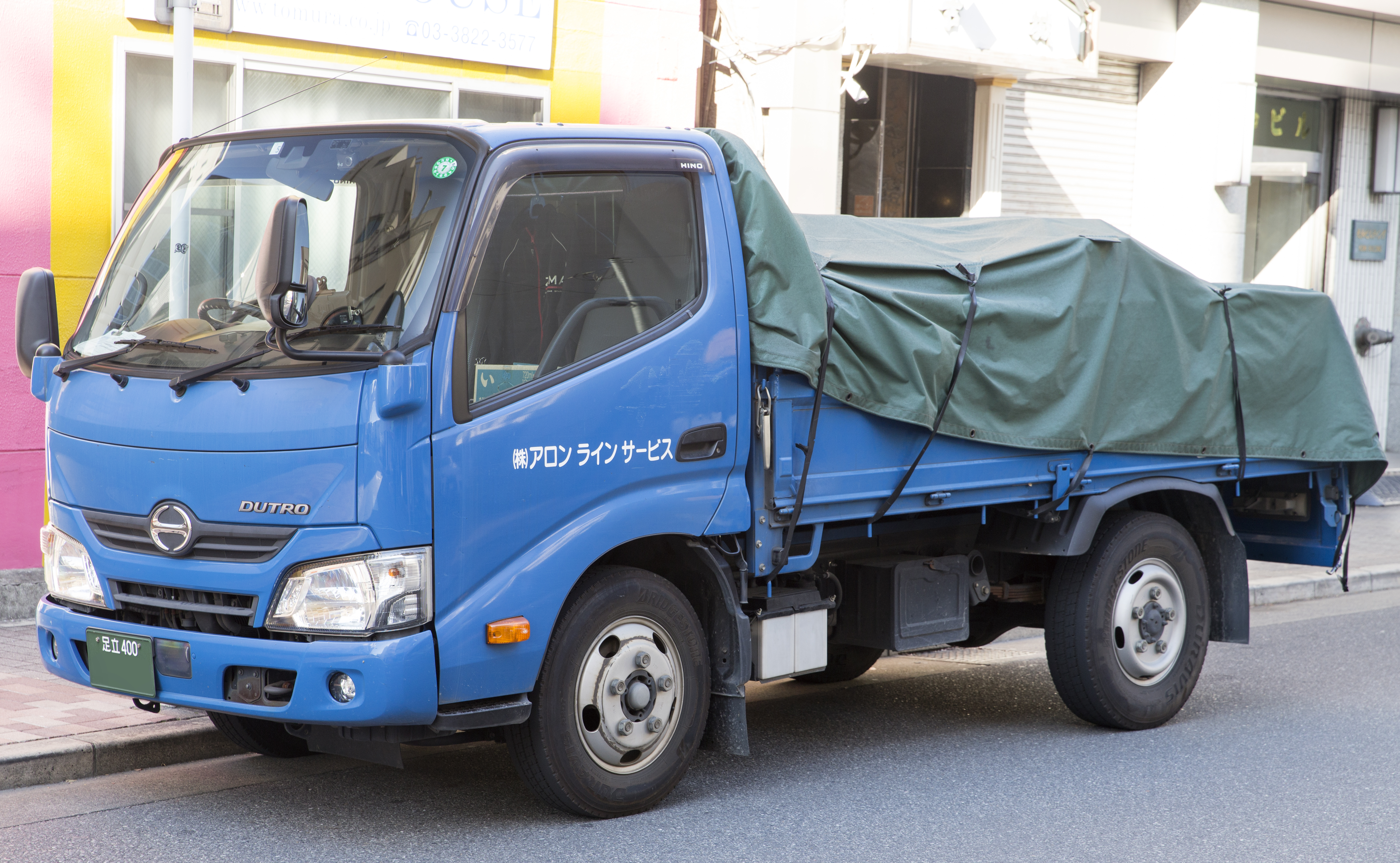
Regular cab (2016 facelift variant)

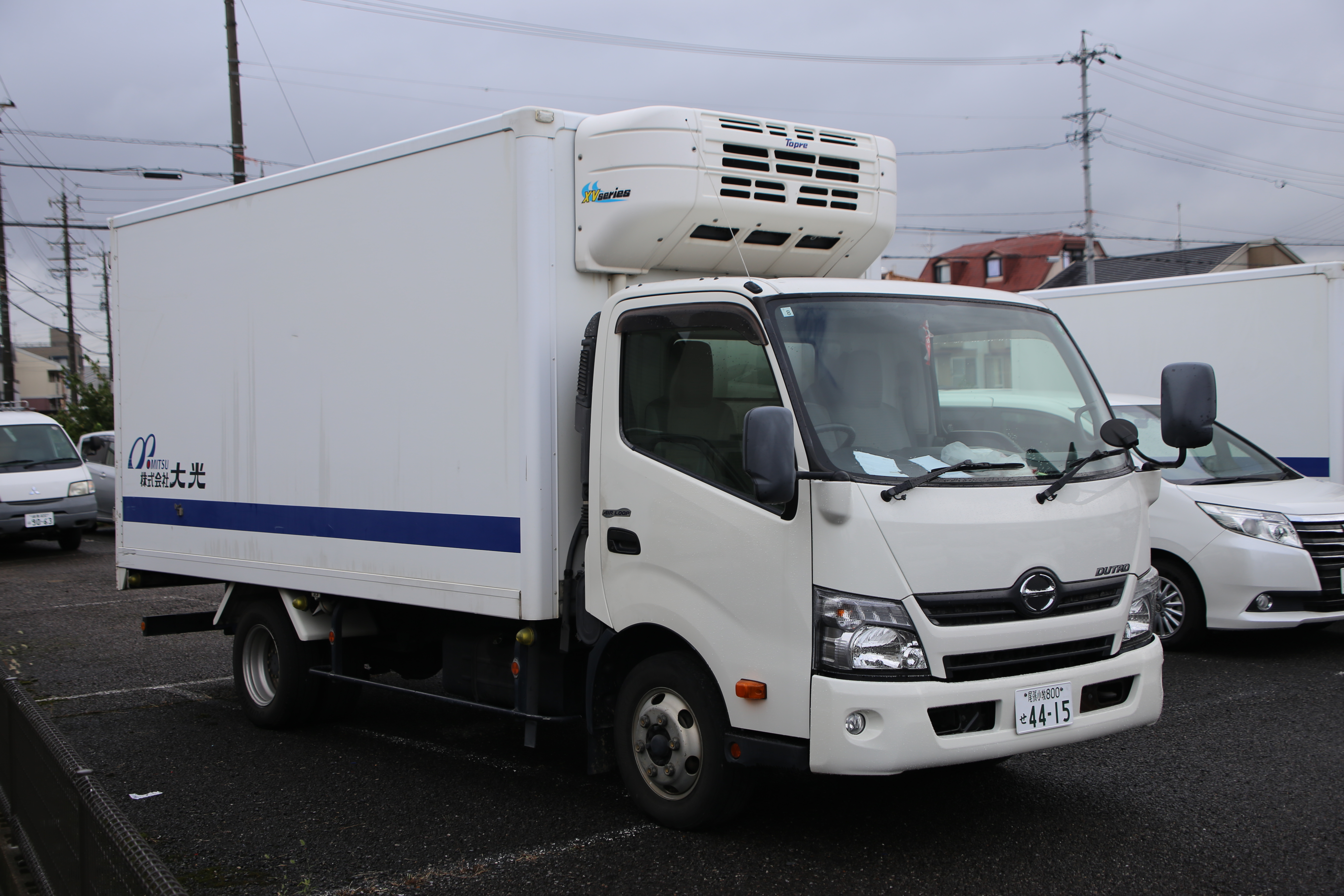
Wide cab

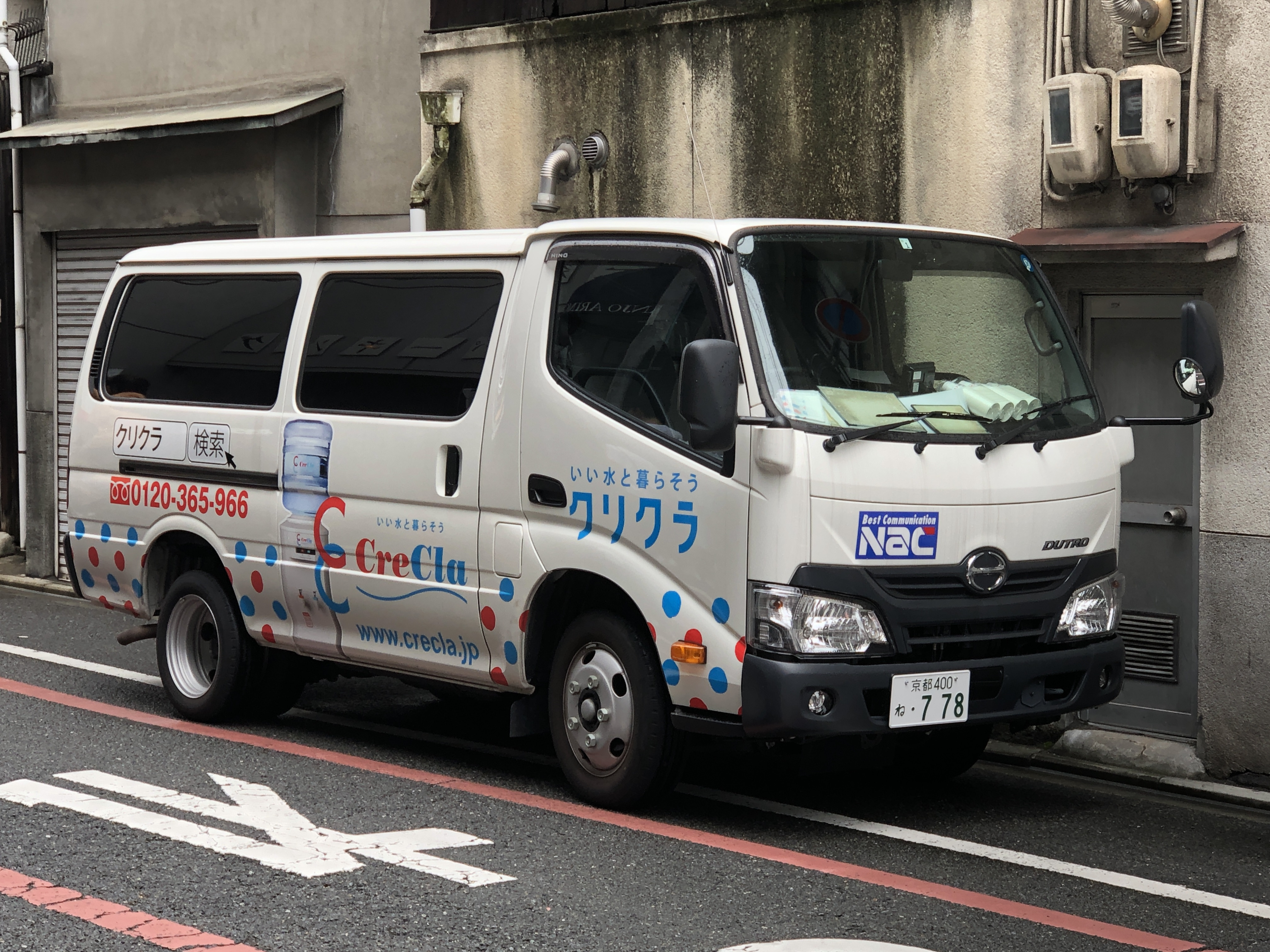
Hino Dutro Route Van (Japan)

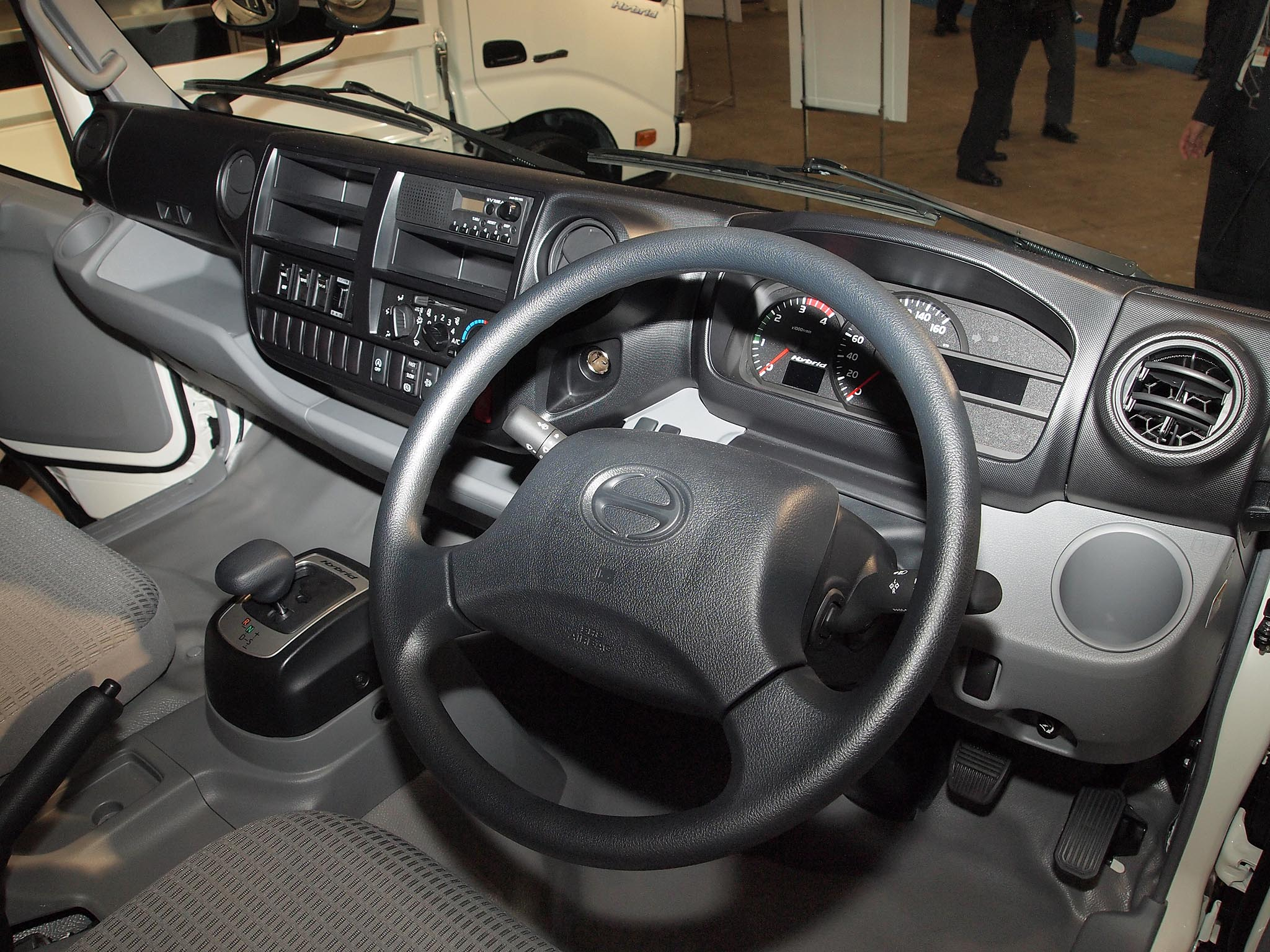
Interior (Hino Dutro Hybrid)

=== Dutro Z EV ===
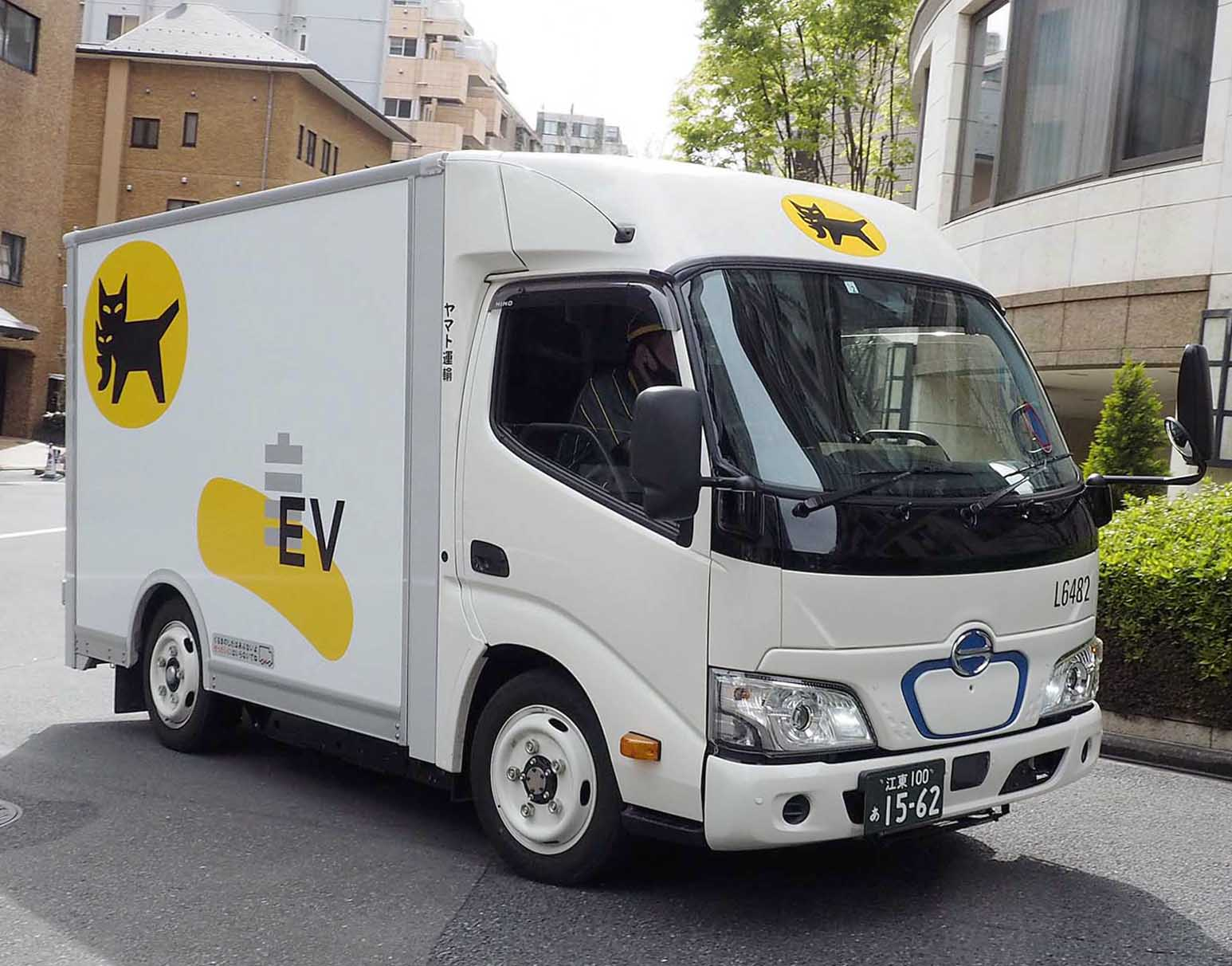
Hino Dutro Z EV in Japan

In April 2021, Hino announced the Dutro Z EV, which was set to launch in the summer of 2022. It is an ultra-low-floor, front-wheel-drive electric walk-through van. The conventional engine and transmission have been replaced by a compact electric motor located under the cabin, while the lithium-ion battery is mounted inside the frame beneath the cargo bed floor. The ultra-low floor reduces the chassis height by approximately 400 mm, providing lower and easier loading access. This compact electric van can be driven with a standard driving license and is very suitable for urban residential areas.

=== Export versions ===
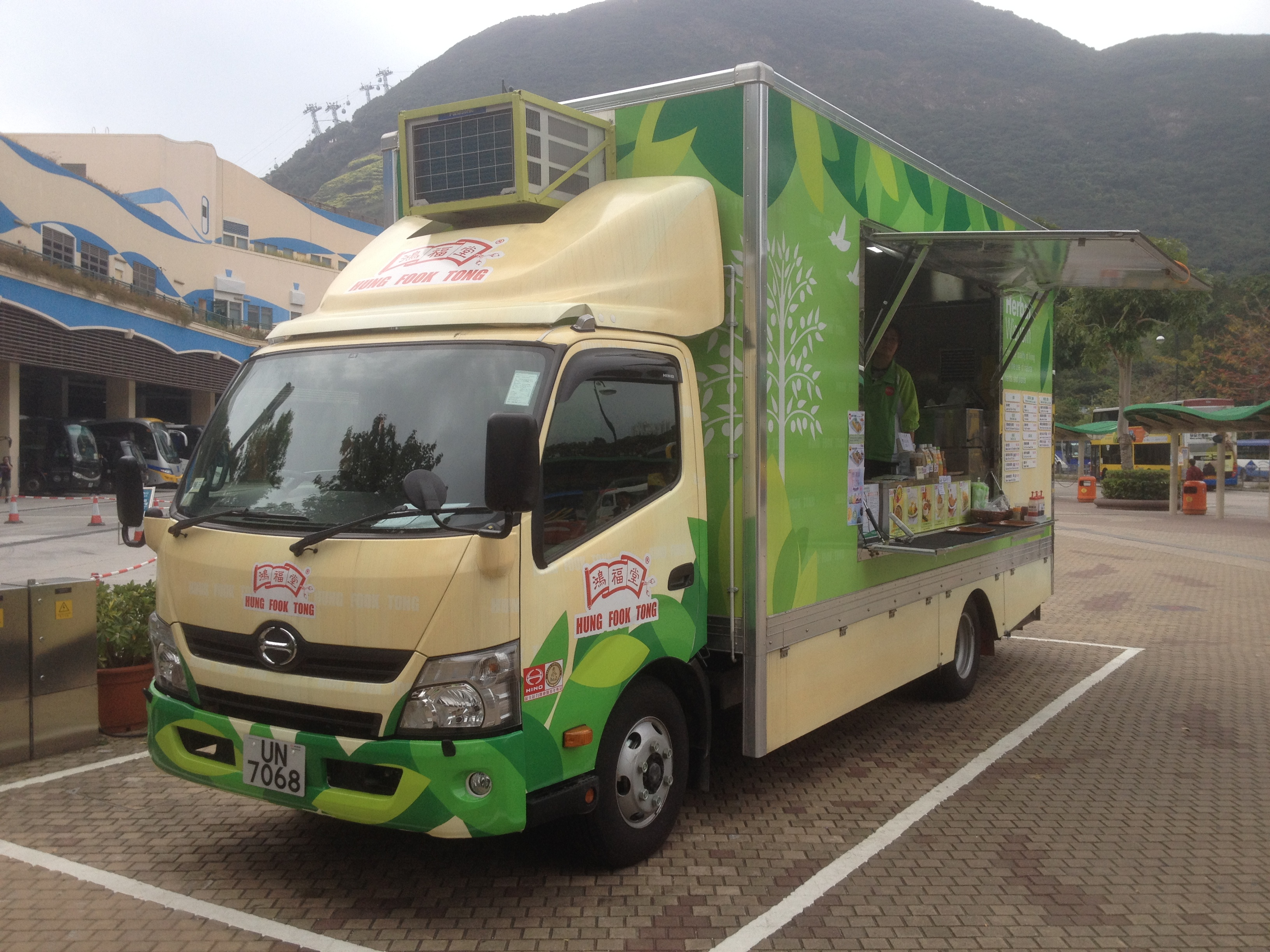
Hino 300 wide cab (XZU700 series, Hong Kong)

The export version of the Dutro is officially marketed as the Hino 300, although the Dutro name is still used in certain countries. In North America, it is officially called the Hino M Series.

Depending on the country, the N04C engine complies with different emissions standards, ranging from Euro 3 to Euro 6. The rear brakes can be either disc or drum.

==== Indonesia ====
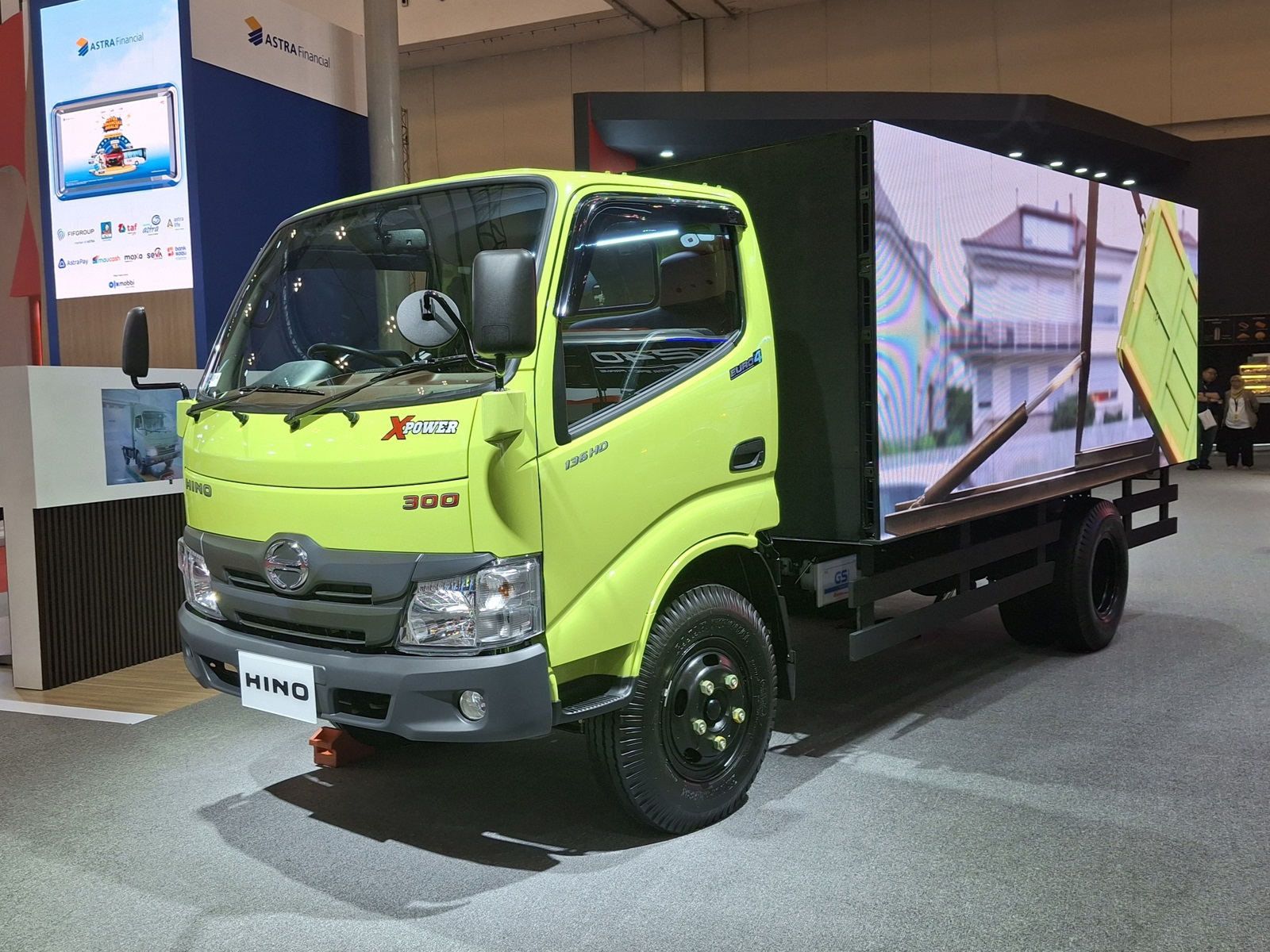
Hino 300 Dutro 136 HD (XZU342)

Hino Motors continues to offer the 300 "Dutro", it received a new update to the Indonesian market in 2011, and comes with new safety equipment and interior. The locally manufactured Hino 300 is offered as 115 SD, 115 SDL, 115 LD, 115 HD, 136 MD, 136 MDL, 136 HD, 136 HDL 4x2, 136 HDL 6x2, and 136 HDX.

==== North America ====
The Hino 300, also known as the Dutro, was marketed in North America as the Hino 155 and Hino 195 until 2019 when the name was changed to the M series. These models were powered by a 5.1-liter J05E-TP diesel engine paired with a 6-speed Aisin automatic transmission. The hybrid model, 195H, was equipped with the J05E-UG engine and a 288-volt nickel-metal hydride battery.

The Hino 155 and 195 feature the same wide cab as the Japanese Dutro, but different mirrors. Gross Vehicle Weight (GVW) is 14,500 lbs. for the 155, or 19,500 lbs. for the 195 model. The 155 and 195 were offered in several different wheelbase.

The facelift models were revealed on October 28, 2019 for the 2021 model year. The Class 4 and 5 range were renamed the M series, coinciding with the launch of the Class 7 and 8 XL series alongside the existing Class 6 and 7 L series.

==== Australia ====
For the Australian market, Hino offers a very wide range of 300 Series. The standard cab is only for the base 616 model with either diesel or Hybrid powered. The wide cab version is for the 616, 617, 716, 717, 816, 817, 916, 917, as well as the High Power 721 and 921 variants. The High Power models came with standard column-stalk operated engine brake, chrome grille and front bumper ornament. Some variants also built as the double cab model which marketed as Crew Cab. Motive power comes from the choice of 4.0 or 5.0-liter common-rail turbo diesel engine, as well as the Hybrid version of the 4.0-liter engine.

The 817 model is also available with 4x4 drivetrain as single wide cab and double cab models. The 4x4 comes with higher ground clearance, differential locks and very low-range crawl gear ratio of 2.2:1.

Hino Smart Safe comes standard on all 300 Series. It includes Pre-Collision System (PCS), Pedestrian Detection, Lane Departure Warning System (LPWS), Vehicle Stability Control (VSC), Reverse Camera, and Daytime Running Lamps (DRL).

=== 200 series / 1.5-tonne class ===
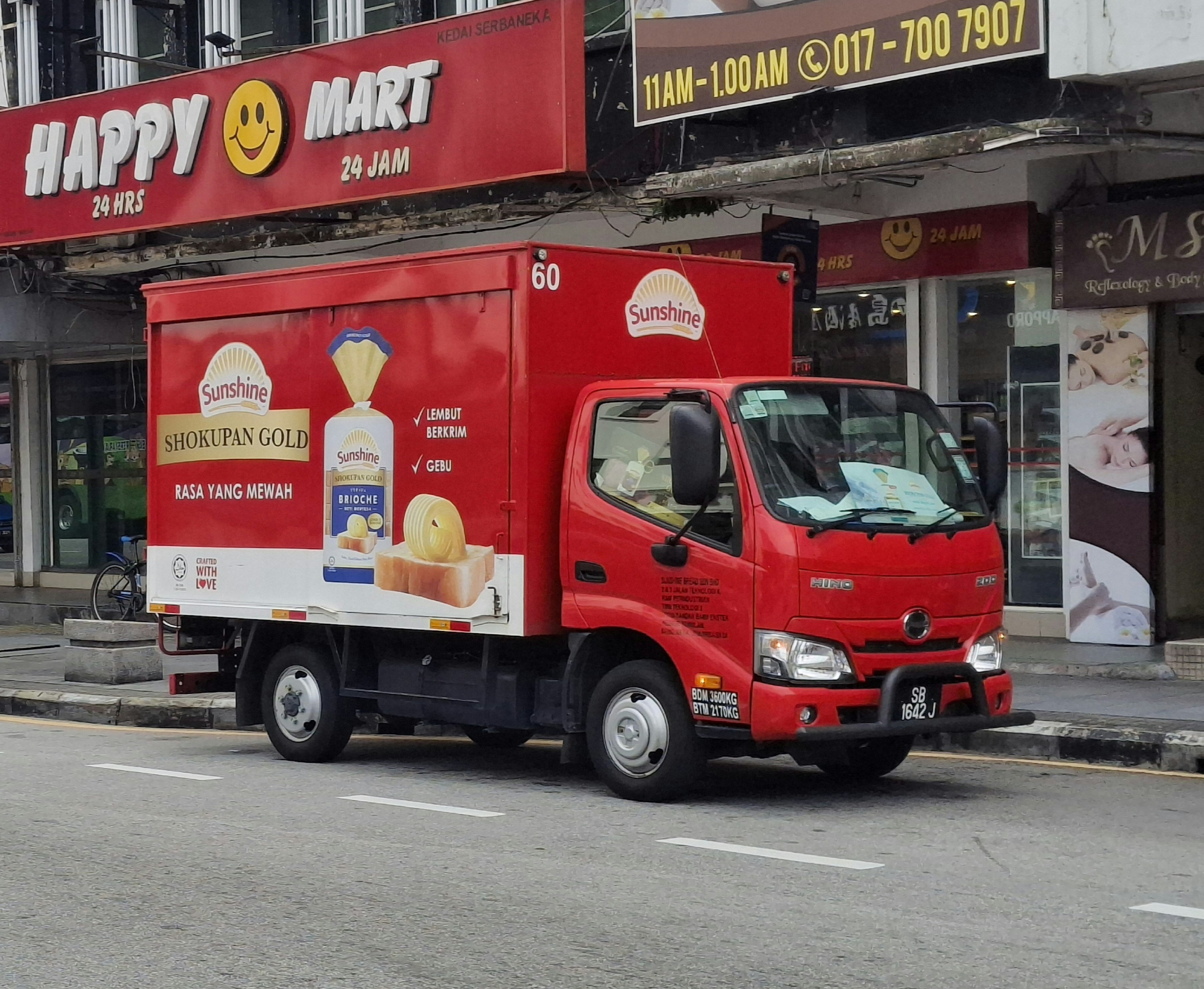
Hino 200 (GDY231, Malaysia)

The Hino 200 series, known as Hino Dutro 1.5-tonne class in Japan, is essentially an entry-level version of the Dutro/300 series. Unlike the standard Dutro/300 series which used the Hino-sourced powerplants, the 200 series features the 2.8-liter 1GD-FTV or 3.0-liter 3GD-FTV diesel engines supplied by Toyota and comes with a manual gearbox.

In Japan, this version of Dutro is subtitled as such to fit in the 1.5-tonne category.

=== Engines ===
Japanese models get three versions of the 4-liter engine, while North American models only get the larger engine. Hybrid variants are also available.

Diesel engines
Engine [Model]	Production [Year]	Displacement	Type
1GD-FTV	2021-	2,755 cc (168.1 cu in)	I4
W04D	2011-	4,009 cc (244.6 cu in)	I4
N04C	2011-	4,009 cc (244.6 cu in)	I4
J05E (North America)	2012-	5,123 cc (312.6 cu in)	I4
