= Hino XL =

Hino XL series

Overview
- Manufacturer: Hino
- Also called: Hino XL7; Hino XL8
- Production: 2019–present
- Assembly: United States: Mineralwells, West Virginia; Canada: Woodstock, Ontario (Hino Motors Canada)

Body and chassis
- Class: Conventional truck
- Related: Hino L series

The Hino XL series are the identical series of Class 7 and 8 conventional cab trucks produced by Hino Motors primarily in the United States and Canada. Introduced in 2019, it was the first model launched by Hino Motors under the modernized nameplate, next to the Class 6/7 L series and the Class 4/5 M series. It is the first truck powered by Hino's newly developed 9-liter diesel engine.

== Specifications ==
The Hino XL series comprises two models: the Hino XL7 is a Class 7 with a rigid tri-axle layout, and the Hino XL8 is a Class 8 but have a larger. A tractor version of the XL8 also added.

The exterior design of the XL series features an LED strip with projector headlamps, and a stylish bumper. The interior also features a 4-spoke steering wheel, a 7-inch Multi Information Display (MID) and a selection of options.

The XL series are powered by the newly developed 8.9-liter A09C six-cylinder diesel engine. Outputs are rated respectively at 300 hp (304 PS; 224 kW) and 360 hp (365 PS; 268 kW). Maximum torque ranges are available from 900 lb⋅ft (1,220 N⋅m) to 1,150 lb⋅ft (1,559 N⋅m). Transmissions come from Allison in auto and Eaton in manual, supported by Dana axles. Available in 4x2 and 6x4 wheel configuration in rigid and tractor formats with three cabin options day cab, extended cab and crew cab.

Production commenced in September 2019 at its new plant in Mineral Wells, West Virginia. It is marketed exclusively for the United States.

Also in 2019, it is assembled in Canada, at its current plant in Woodstock, Ontario.

=== Engines ===
Diesel engines
Engine [Model]	Production [Year]	Displacement	Cylinder
A09C	2019–present	8,866 cc (541.0 cu in)	Inline 6

== See also ==
- Hino 600
- Hino Dutro
- Hino Motors
- Allison Transmission
- Eaton Corporation
- Conventional truck
