= Hino 600 =

Hino 600/L Series
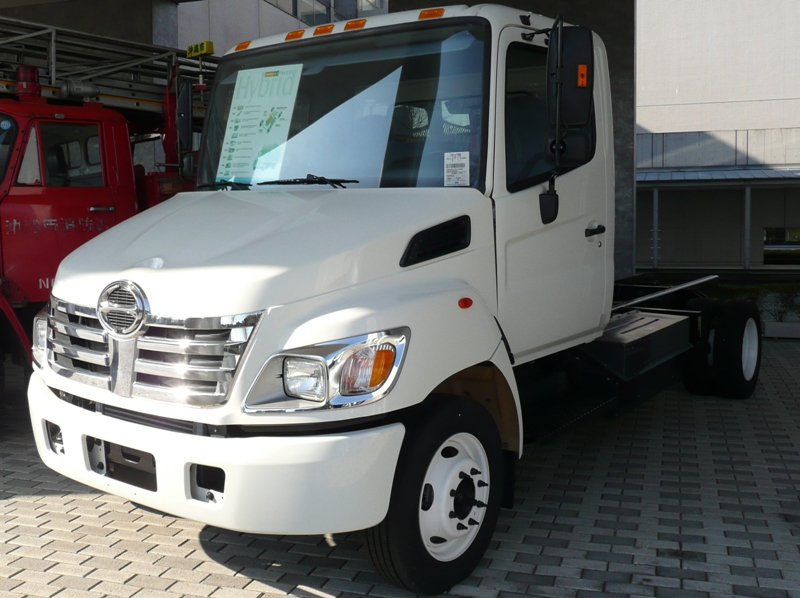
- Hino 165 Hybrid

Overview
- Manufacturer: Hino
- Also called: Hino 165; Hino 175; Hino 268; Hino 358; Hino 185; Hino 338; Hino L Series
- Production: 2004–2020 (Hino 600); 2021–present (Hino L Series)
- Assembly: United States: Mineralwells, West Virginia; Canada: Woodstock, Ontario (Hino Motors Canada)

Body and chassis
- Class: Conventional truck
- Related: Hino XL

Chronology
- Predecessor: Hino F-Series

The Hino 600 (also known as the 145, 165, 185, 238, 258, 268, 338 and 358 nameplates), renamed as the L Series since the 2021 model year, is a conventional cab medium-duty truck manufactured since 2004 in the US by Hino.

== Hino 600 Series (2004) ==
The first-generation 600 was introduced in 2004 for the United States and in 2005 for the Canadian market to replace the Hino Ranger-based fourth generation F-Series cabover. The facelift model 600 was introduced in 2007 for both the American and Canadian markets. Some CKD kits were imported from Japan. The medium-duty Class 4 and 5 models were replaced by the Hino Dutro-based Hino 155 and 195 in 2012.

Models:

- 145 Class 4 - light duty truck
- 165 Class 4 - medium duty truck
- 185 Class 5 - medium duty truck
- 238 Class 6 - medium duty truck
- 258 Class 6 - medium duty truck
- 268 Class 6 - medium duty truck
- 308 Class 7 - heavy duty truck
- 338 Class 7 - heavy duty truck
- 358 Class 7 - heavy duty truck
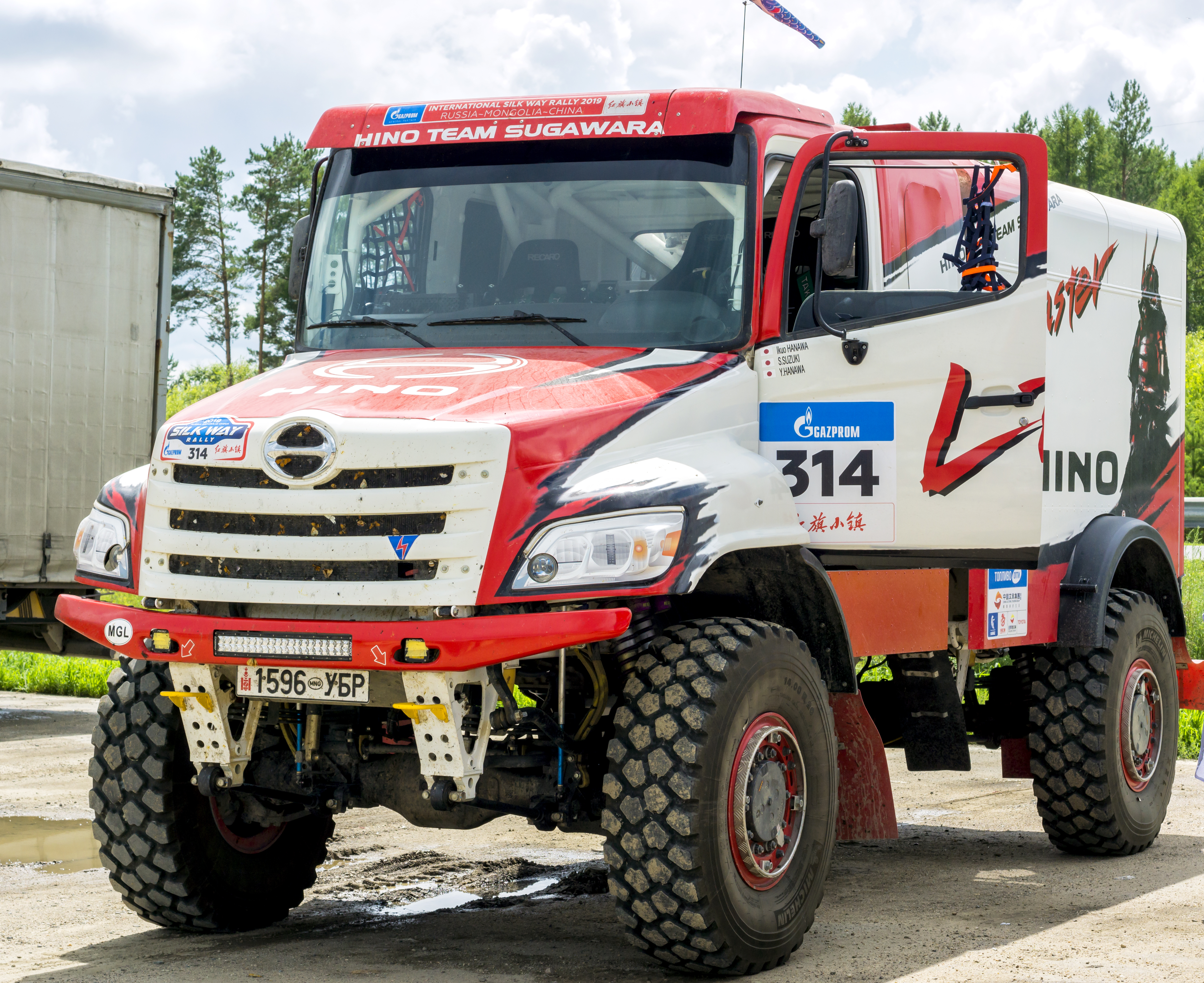
Hino 600 Team Sugawara rally truck

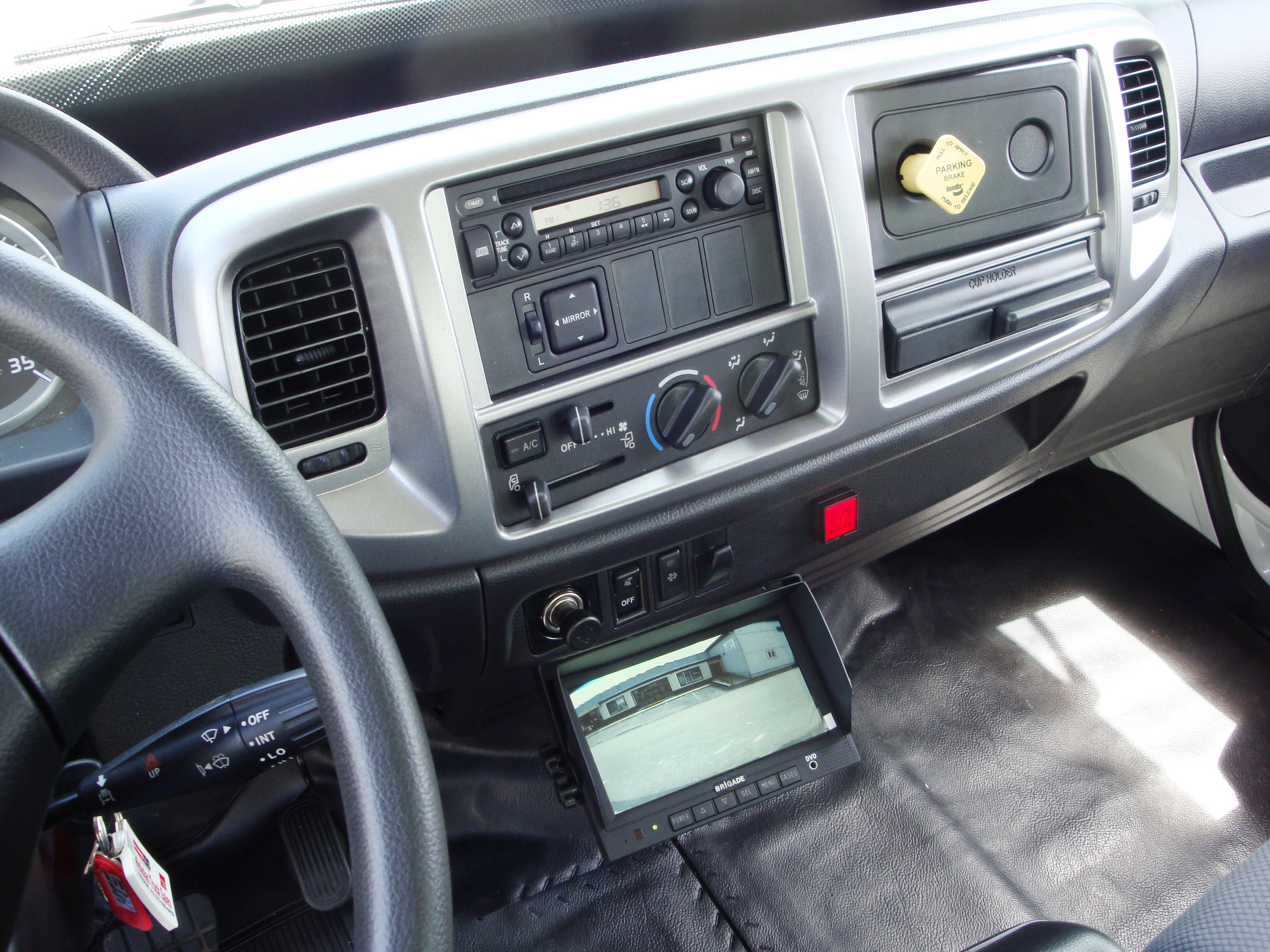
Hino 268 center dashboard

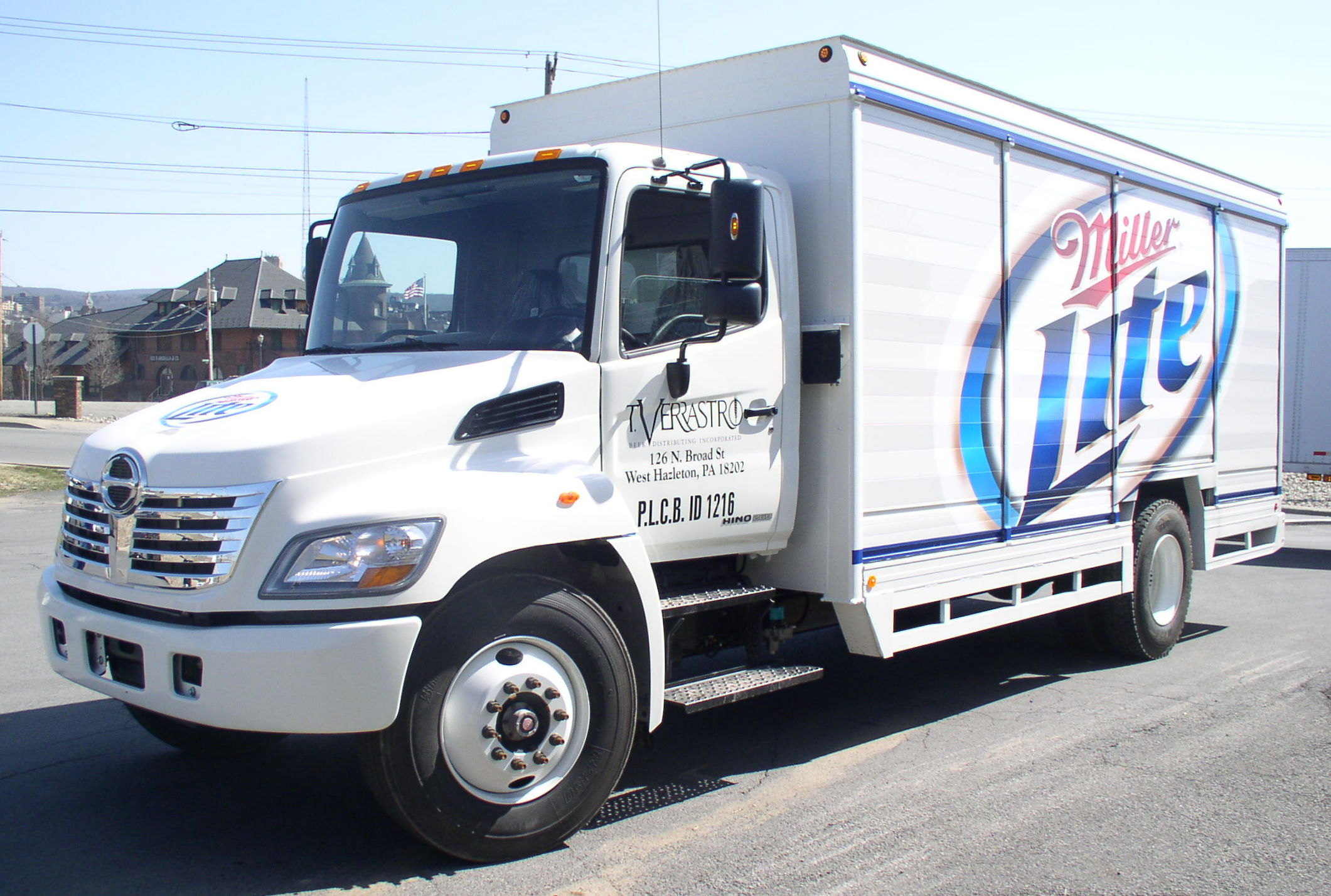
Hino 338 T beverage truck

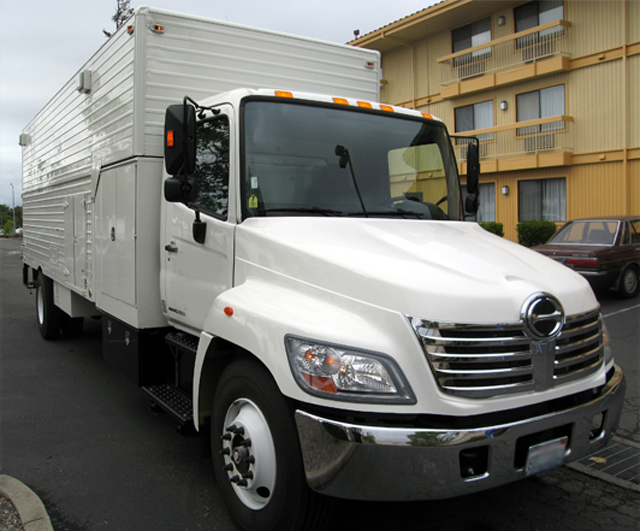
Hino 268 A used as a location production and video broadcasting truck

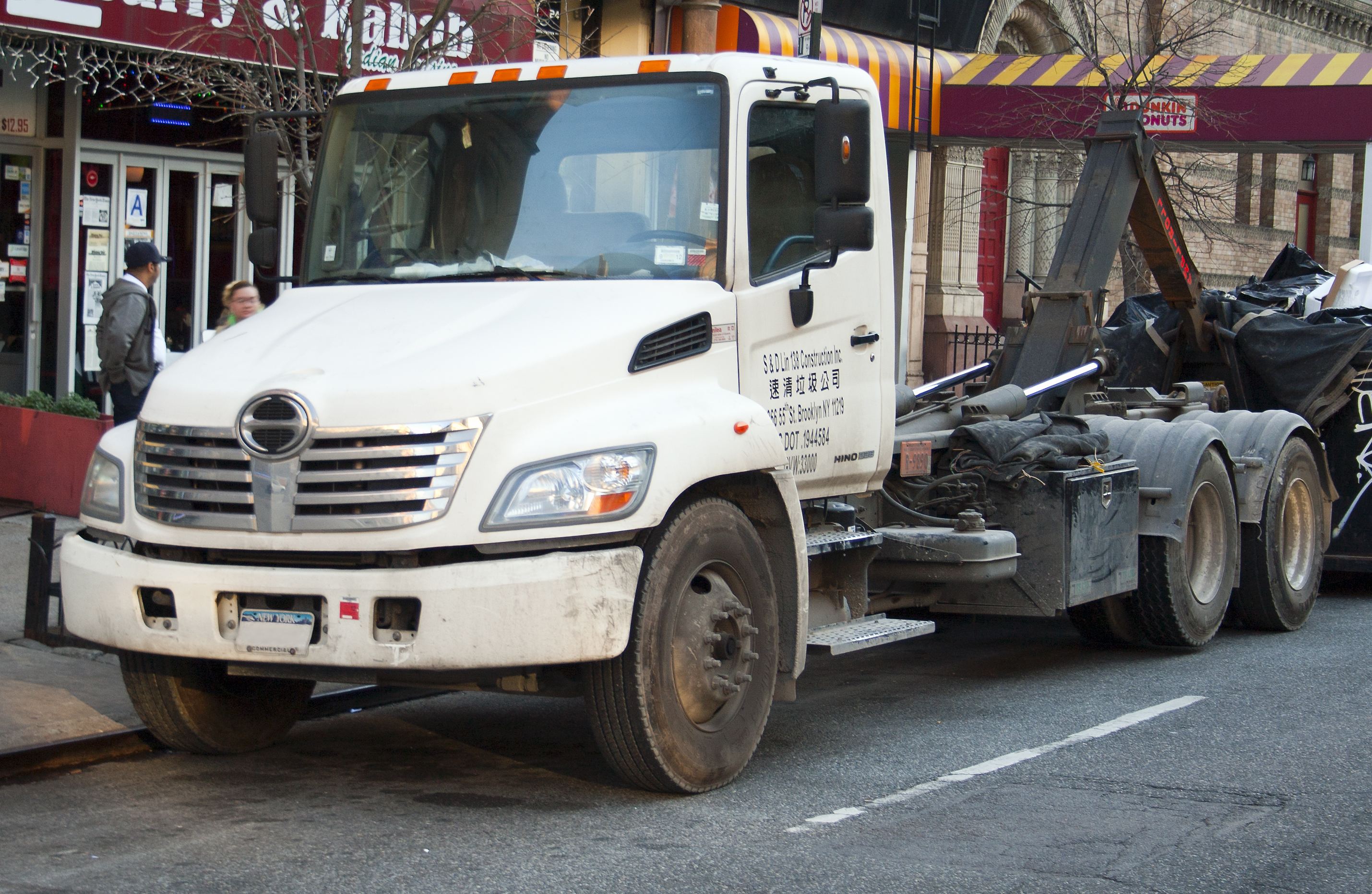
Hino 338 three-axle dump

== Hino L Series (2021) ==
The facelifted model was announced on October 28, 2019 for the 2021 model year It was officially renamed the L series, to fit with the larger Class 7 and 8 XL series, and the smaller Class 4 and 5 M series.

The L Series' exterior design features new headlamps, and a redesigned bumper. The interior also features a four-spoke steering wheel, a 7-inch Multi Information Display (MID) and a selection of options. Initially it was powered by Hino's J08E diesel engine, but switched to Cummins B6.7 for the 2022 model year. The 240 bhp or 260 bhp Cummins engine in the Hino L series is paired to Allison automatic transmission. The Hino L Series is equipped with Meritor axles and Dana Spicer driveshafts

For the US market, the Hino L Series are offered with variations of wheelbase from 152 to 301 inches. The Canadian-spec Hino L6 is available with different length of wheelbase from 175 to 271 inches, the L7 are from 187 to 280 inches, and the L8 from 187 to 271 inches.
