= Toyota W engine =

The Toyota W Engine is a water cooled straight-4 diesel engine.

== 1W ==
Toyota 1W Engine

Overview
- Manufacturer: Hino Motors
- Also called: Hino W04D
- Production: 1983-1995

Layout
- Configuration: Inline-4
- Displacement: 4.0 L; 244.6 cu in (4,009 cc)
- Cylinder bore: 104 mm (4.09 in)
- Piston stroke: 118 mm (4.65 in)
- Cylinder block material: cast iron
- Cylinder head material: cast iron
- Valvetrain: OHV 8-valve
- Compression ratio: 17.9:1

Combustion
- Fuel system: Direct injection
- Fuel type: Diesel
- Cooling system: Water-cooled

Output
- Power output: 86 kW (115 hp) @ 3200 rpm
- Specific power: 21.5 kW (28.8 hp)/L
- Torque output: 275 N⋅m (203 ft⋅lb) @ 2000 rpm

Dimensions
- Length: 898 mm (35.4 in)
- Width: 637 mm (25.1 in)
- Height: 762 mm (30.0 in)
- Dry weight: 340 kg (750 lb)

The Toyota 1W Engine was built by Hino Motors for use in Toyota Dyna and Toyoace light trucks in the Japanese market. It is a 4.0 L (4,009 cc) direct injection 8 valve OHV diesel engine. The equivalent Hino W04D engine is used for Toyota Dyna trucks and in current model Hino 300 Series trucks

This engine was also used and marinized by the American motorboat manufacturer Bayliner for use in their 32 Motoryacht from 1985-1995.

Applications

- Toyota Dyna (WU26, WU40, WU50, WU90, WU95)
- Toyota ToyoAce
- Toyota Type 73 medium truck (first generation)

== See also ==
- List of Toyota engines
