= Citroën C4 =

Compact car

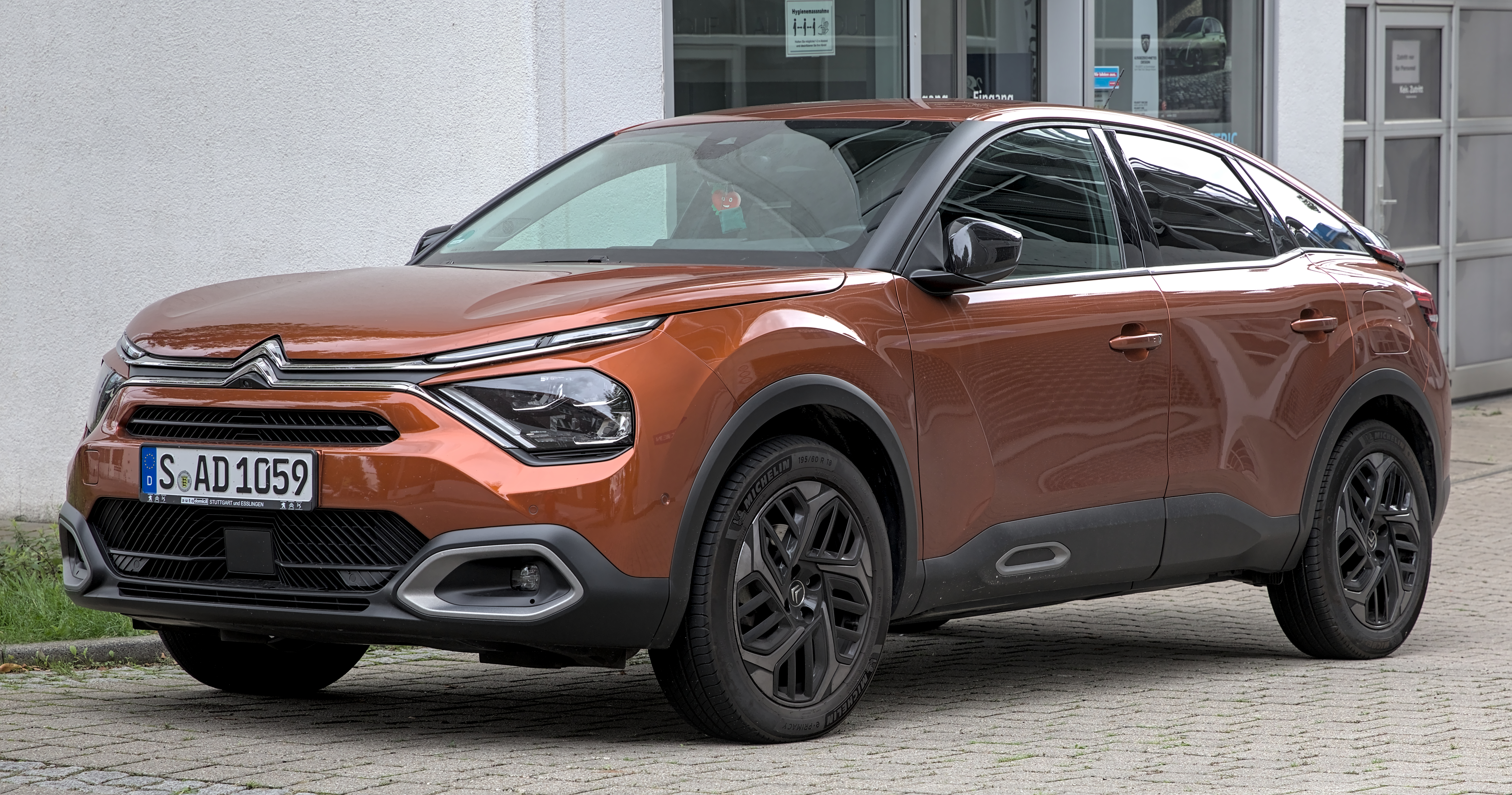
- Third generation Citroën C4

Overview
- Manufacturer: Citroën (Note: PSA Group (2004–2021); Stellantis (2021–present))
- Production: 2004–present

Body and chassis
- Class: Small family car/Compact car (2004–2022); Compact crossover SUV (2020–present)
- Layout: Front-engine, front-wheel-drive

Chronology
- Predecessor: Citroën Xsara
- Successor: DS 4 (for C4 Coupé)

The Citroën C4 is a car produced by Citroën, part of Stellantis. It was positioned to be the successor to the Citroën Xsara. The first generation production started in September 2004. For its first two generations, the C4 was a compact car/small family car, but it was redesigned as a subcompact crossover SUV for its third generation.

In June 2020, the third-generation C4 was released in the form of coupé SUV, abandoning the traditional C-segment hatchback/saloon body style.

== First generation (B5; 2004) ==
First generation
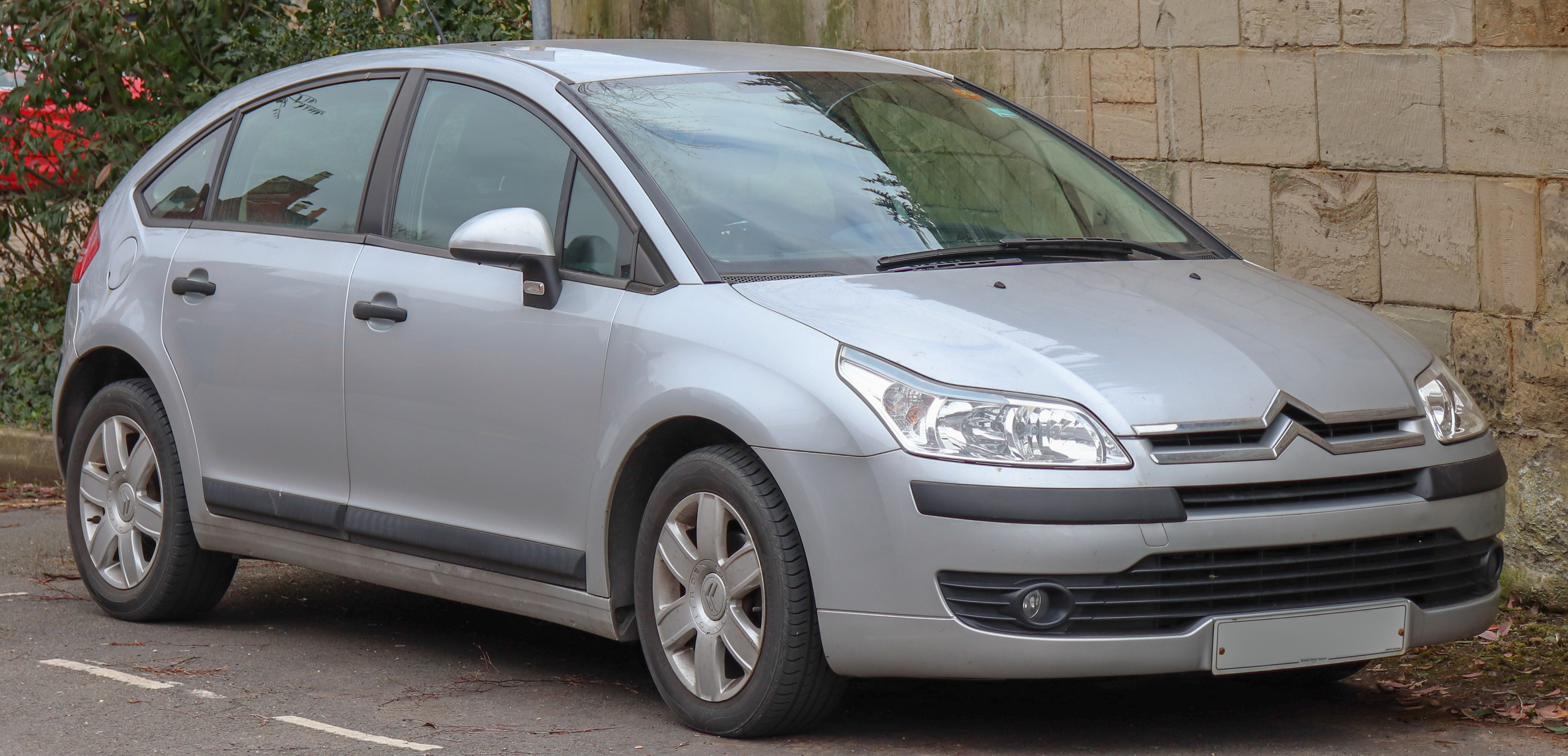
- 2006 Citroen C4 Hatchback 1.6 SX (UK)

Overview
- Also called: Citroën C-Triomphe; Citroën C-Quatrè
- Production: 2004–2010; 2007–2015 (Argentina)
- Assembly: France: Mulhouse (PSA Mulhouse Plant); China: Wuhan (DPCA); Argentina: El Palomar
- Designer: Donato Coco; Domagoj Đukec (coupe)

Body and chassis
- Body style: 3-door coupé 5-door hatchback 4-door saloon 5-door MPV (C4 Picasso)
- Platform: PSA PF2 platform
- Related: Citroën C4 Picasso; Citroën DS4; Peugeot 307; Peugeot 308; Peugeot 3008; Peugeot 5008; DS 5LS

Powertrain
- Engine: Petrol: 1.4 L ET3 I4; 1.6 L TU5 I4; 1.6 L EP6 VTi I4; 1.6 L EP6DT THP I4 (turbo); 2.0 L EW10A I4; 2.0 L EW10J4 I4; 2.0 L EW10J4S I4; Diesel: 1.6 L DV6 HDi I4 (turbo); 2.0 L DW10 HDi I4 (turbo)
- Transmission: 5/6-speed manual 4-speed automatic (BVA); 6-speed automated manual (MCP)

Dimensions
- Wheelbase: 2,608 mm (102.7 in); 2,710 mm (106.7 in) (saloon)
- Length: 4,274 mm (168.3 in) (coupé); 4,260 mm (167.7 in) (hatchback); 4,588 mm (180.6 in) (saloon SWB); 4,770 mm (187.8 in) (saloon)
- Width: 1,769 mm (69.6 in)
- Height: 1,458 mm (57.4 in); 1,510 mm (59.4 in) (saloon)
- Curb weight: 2,315 lb (1,050 kg)

=== Debut ===
To cope with the market, Citroën was dedicated and committed to building a new model that would appeal to many customers. At the Geneva Motor Show in 2004, a concept from the Citroën line's definitive made-bodied coupé revealed the willingness of the French company to employ it in competition. The car was finally unveiled at the 2004 Paris Motor Show, after being officially launched to retail on September 2, 2004. However, that version was a more domesticated hatchback coupé or five-door.

=== Design ===
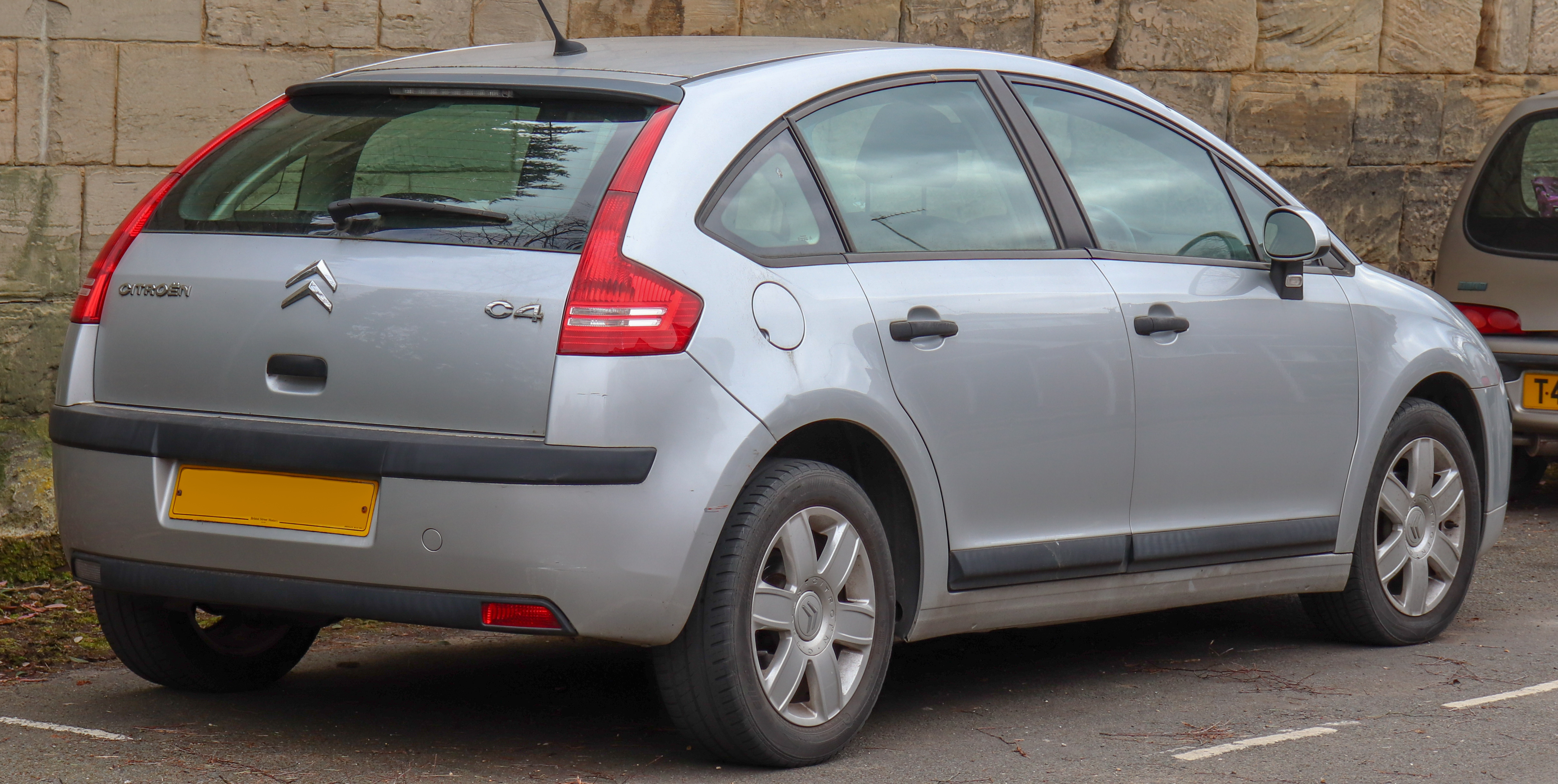
Pre-facelift Citroen C4 Hatchback 1.6 SX (UK)

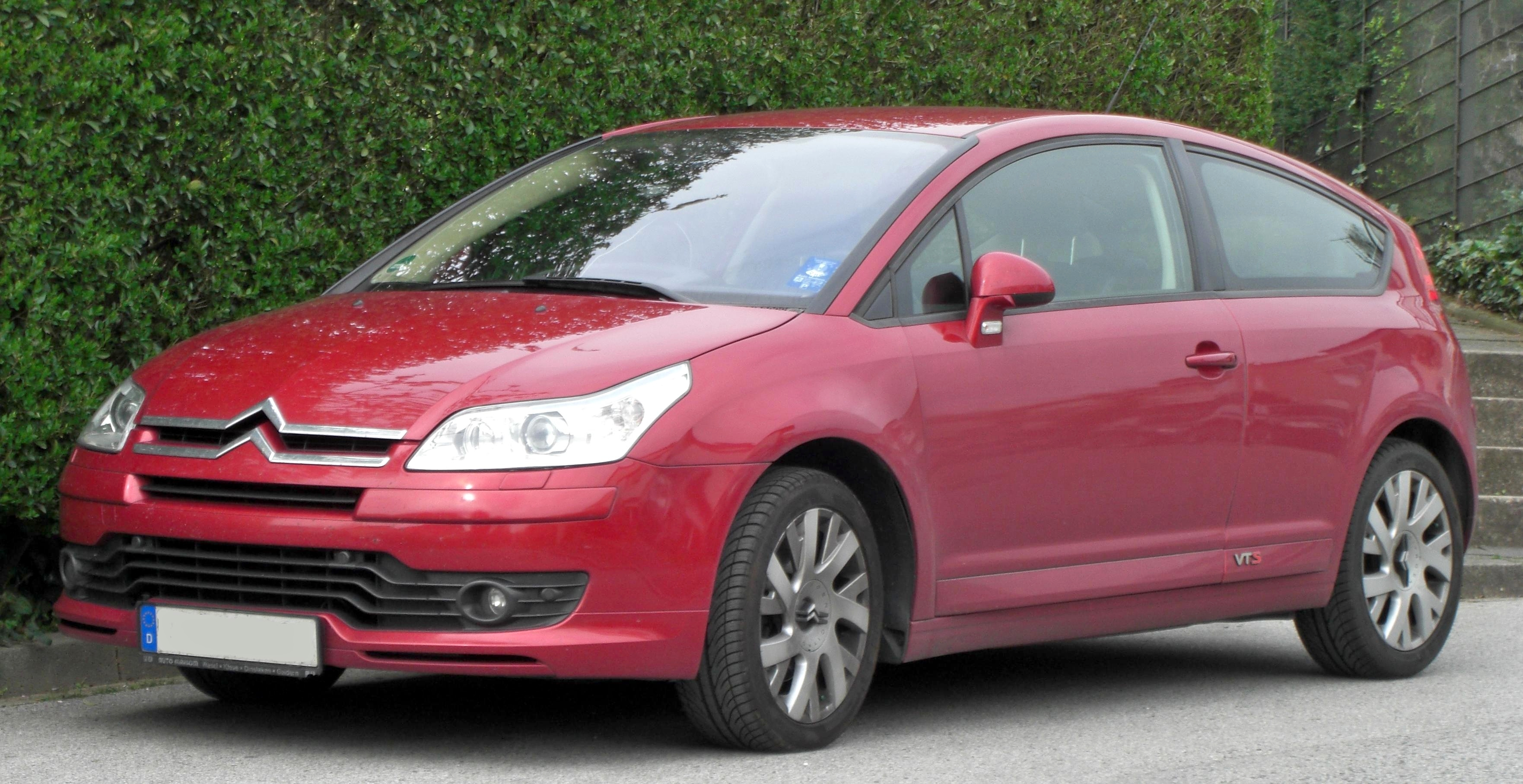
Pre-facelift Citroen C4 Coupé VTS (Germany)

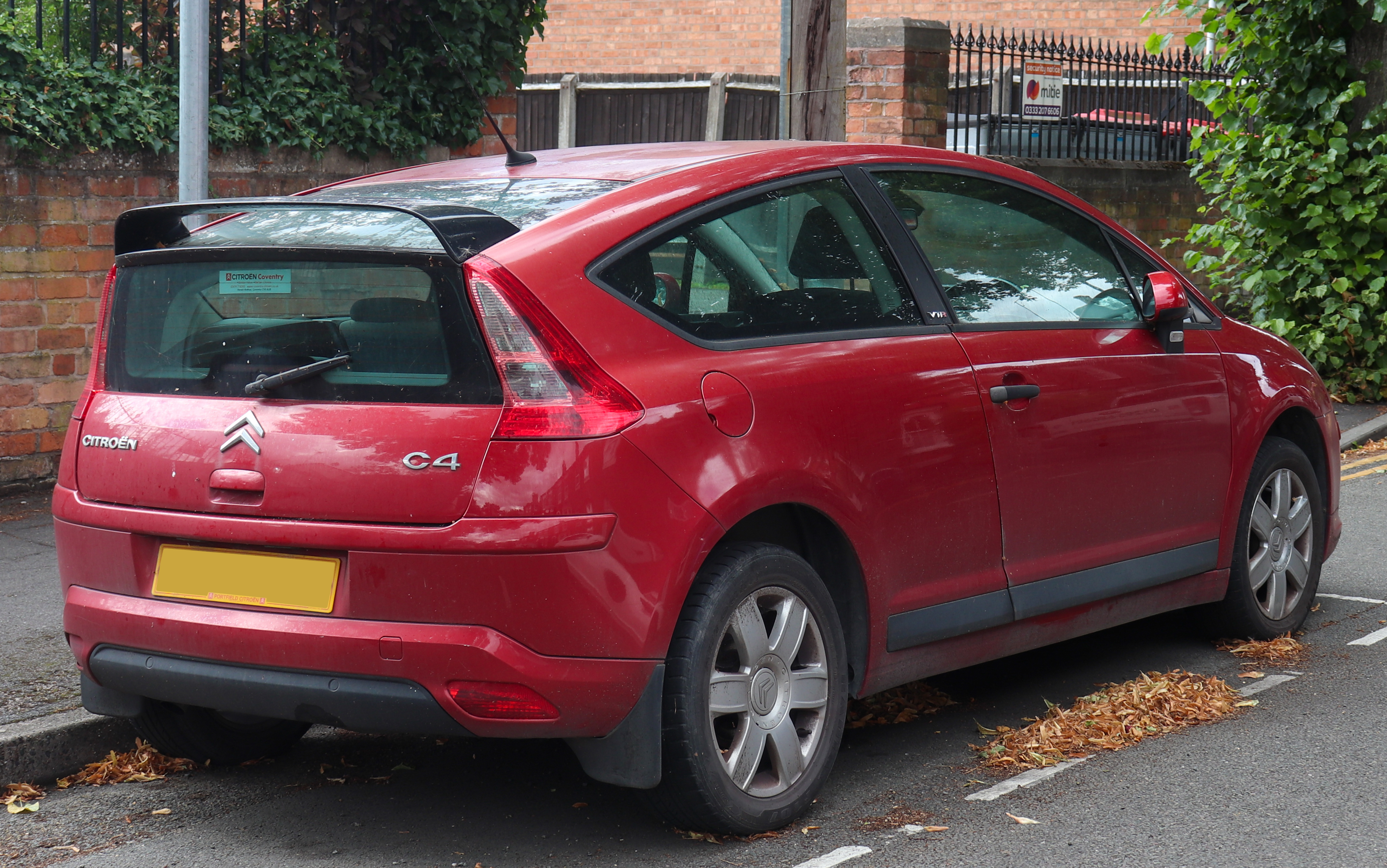
Pre-facelift Citroen C4 Coupé 1.6 HDi VTR (UK)

The C4's design was created by a team that included Donato Coco, Jean Pierre Ploué and Bertrand Rapatel. Building on the floor of its cousin, the Peugeot 307, the C4 was immediately made available in two body variants: five-door hatchback and three-door coupé. The front is common to both versions, with the grille formed from virtual extensions of the central crest. The saloon is much more rounded and features softer shapes, so they can boast a Cd of just 0.28, while the coupe is more angular, with a rear split into two parts, including lights.

The rear window of the coupé is reminiscent of the older Honda CR-X from the early 1990s, as well as the last three-door Mazda 323C. These two versions of the C4 Picasso are more detached, taking over the grille of the saloon and coupe, but the cut of the headlamps are different, aesthetically combining corners and curves. The rear lights incorporate the design as in those of the saloon but were adapted to the different shape of the body. Internally, the dashboard features a central instrument panel that centralizes all heating and cooling controls, audio, and a satellite navigation screen. The instrument panel contains digital and analog displays of the speedometer, petrol levels, and other gauges. Lighting can be customized to change color from white to blue.

The revolution, however, is placed in canonical position, behind the wheel. The latter is multifunctional and characterized by having a fixed hub. The cabin is equipped with numerous storage compartments and the luggage compartment is regular in shape, with a capacity of 352 liters, increasing to 1,200 after lowering the rear seat backrest. The load threshold is quite high, hitting loads of heavy objects. There are laminated side windows and exterior mirrors, with a casing specially designed to prevent wind noise and improve the comfort inside.

The saloon version is manufactured in Argentina, where it is sold alongside the five-door and the imported three-door version. The C4 Saloon is exported from there to Brazil and Hungary as the C4 Pallas and to Spain, Turkey, and Greece as the C4 Sedan. A longer four-door saloon version with a different rear end is also built and sold in China as the Citroën C-Triomphe. A panel van based on the coupé bodyshell is available in some markets, including Ireland.

=== Technology ===
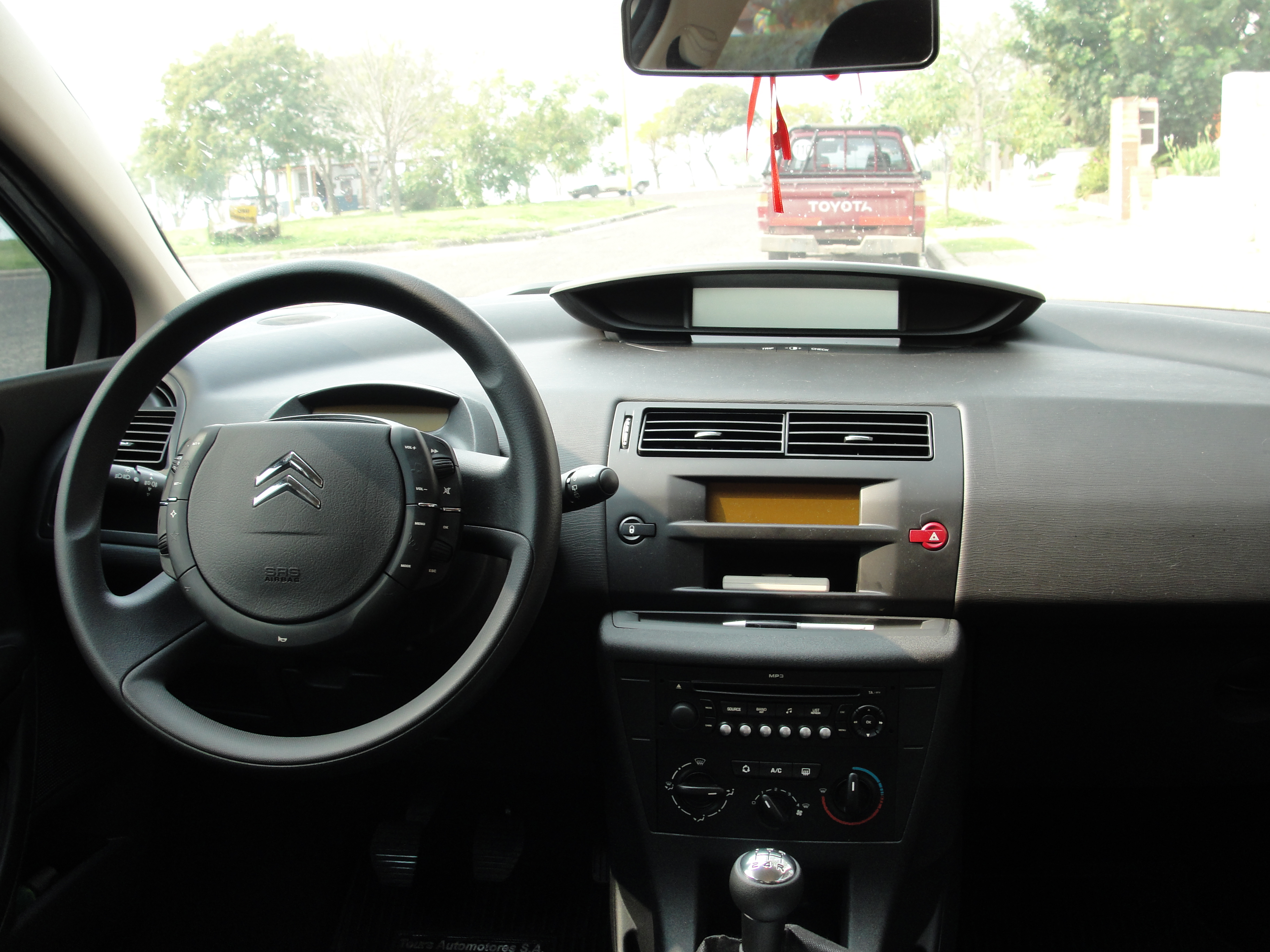
Interior

A major selling point of the C4 was its extensive use of technology. For example, the car features the "lane departure warning system" (only in the top-of-the-range "exclusive" model), which alerts the driver if they cross a road marking without using the turn signals; directional headlights; perfume dispenser integrated into the ventilation system; translucent dashboard; transparent glass roof; electronic stability program (ESP), and a fixed steering wheel hub, which lets the driver operate several functions of the car without removing their hands from the wheel.

The fixed hub also allows for the first production use of a "shaped" driver airbag. Because the hub maintains a constant position, the airbag can be optimally shaped to spread the load across the greatest possible area of the driver's body in a collision, thus reducing the chances of serious injury. In addition, the car features an innovative centrally mounted translucent LCD speedometer display that remains clearly visible in all lighting conditions.

The car's in-car entertainment, integrated into the car's information system via VAN bus, is not Digital audio broadcasting (DAB) ready. MP3 playback is supported by the entry level audio system and high-end audio, with double-layer sound-insulated windows and integrated navigation system available as extras. In September 2007, a USB box accessory was released to enable full iPod connectivity with the standard RD4 radio.

The C4 does not feature Citroën's Hydractive suspension, which is reserved for higher class models, such as the C5 and C6. The Picasso version can feature a pneumatic rear suspension. The C4 breaks with the past on other fronts, in particular by removing the rear autodirezionale solution, used up to that time on the Xsara and ZX. The suspension is the usual type MacPherson strut front suspension with coil springs, while the rear has interconnected wheels with torsion beam and torsion bars. The braking system includes ventilated discs on the front, and rear solid discs with ABS and ESP (not standard versions with basic fittings). The steering is rack and pinion with electro-hydraulic power steering.

=== 2008 facelift ===
At the 2008 Moscow International Automobile Salon, Citroën presented a facelifted Citroën C4. Both hatchback and coupé were subject to a slight cosmetic makeover that involved the front end, which now sported a "mouth" and larger trapezoid shape. The grille was redesigned, making it slightly curved. There were also minor updates at the back. The redesign led to a slight lengthening of the car body, and was the occasion for more news: from the mechanical point of view was the arrival of the 1.6 Prince, with variable valve timing and aspiration, and turbocharged and direct injection, already mounted on the Peugeot 207 and 308, as well as the Mini. Ride comfort was improved, and the more simplified saloon and the coupe were offered for the same price. In addition, the diesel versions were available with Airdream pack, which allowed for slightly reduced emissions and consumption.

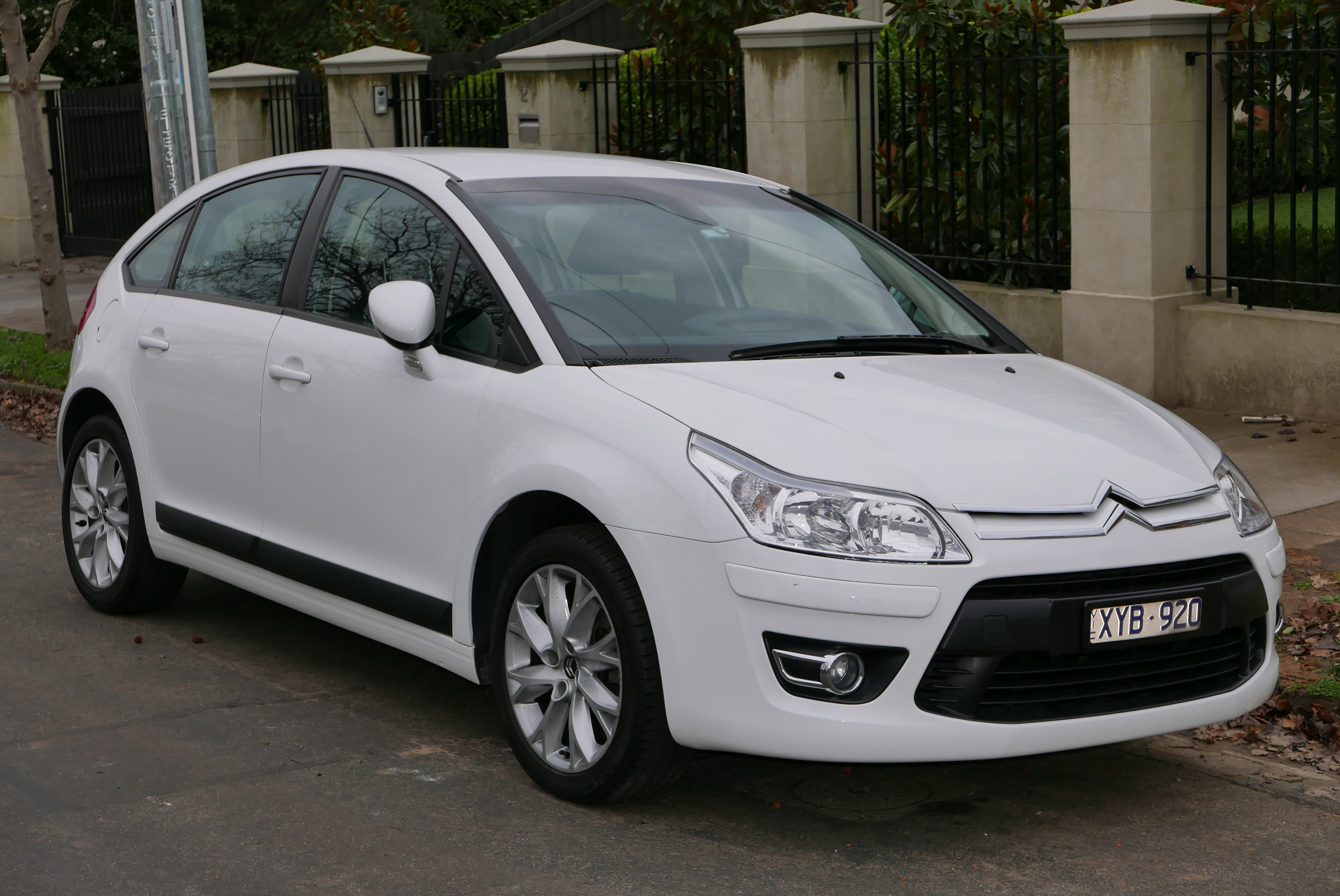
Facelift Citroën C4 (Australia)

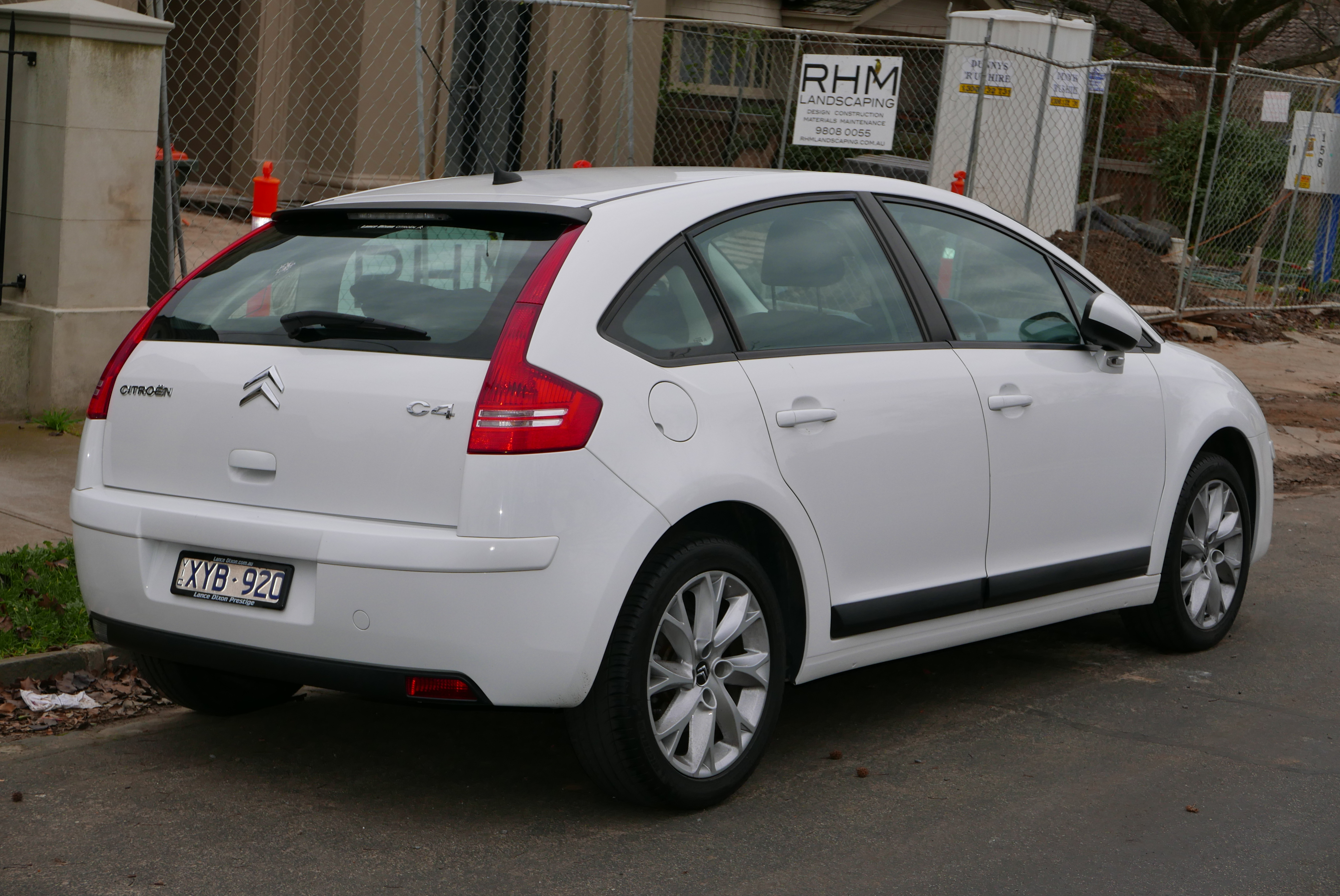
Facelift Citroën C4 Hatchback (Australia)

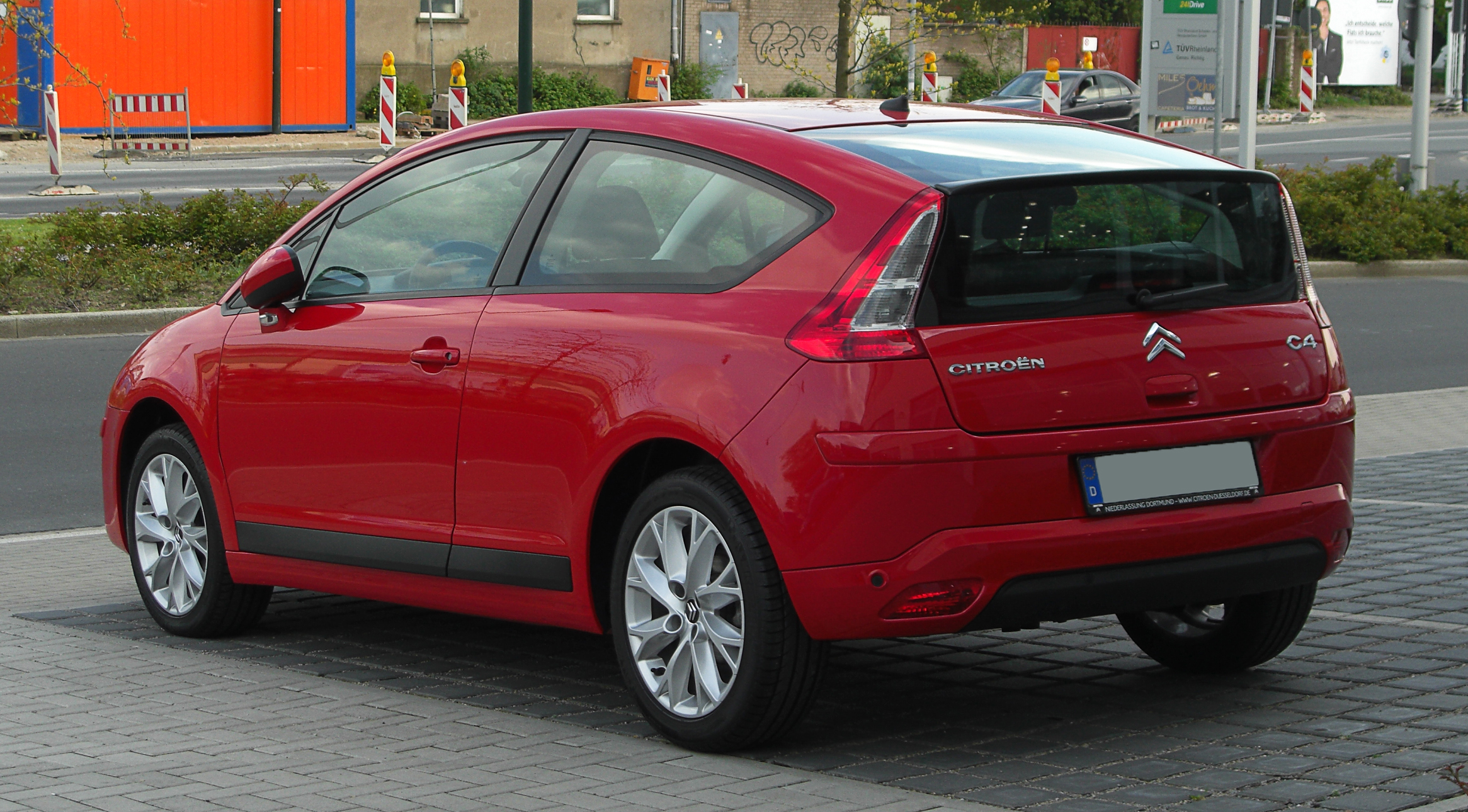
Coupe (facelift)

=== C-Triomphe / C4 Pallas / C4 Sedan ===
The saloon version was introduced as the Citroën C-Triomphe, a mid-size saloon automobile produced from April 2006 for the Chinese market by Dongfeng Peugeot-Citroën Automobile, a joint venture between the French PSA Group (Peugeot-Citroën) and the Chinese manufacturer Dongfeng.

This new model range was designed to supplement other Chinese models, such as the Fukang and the Elysée, rather than being a direct replacement.

In April 2007, Citroën announced that the four-door C4 would be built in Argentina. The Argentinian and Brazilian versions are sold as the C4 Pallas and C4 Sedan in some South American and European markets.

The car is a notchback saloon version of the European C4 model, since the Chinese market prefers traditional three-box saloons over hatchbacks. It did not keep the designation, however, because in Chinese, the number "4" is unlucky. The saloon is much larger than the hatchback: its length is 4,770 mm (187.8 in) over the hatchback's 4,260 mm (167.7 in) and its wheelbase measures 2,710 mm (106.7 in) against 2,610 mm (102.8 in) of the hatchback. This caused the C-Triomphe saloon to be classified in the large family car class. The C-Triomphe has a number of unique features, such as an integrated air freshener, which allows the driver to choose the scent of the interior.

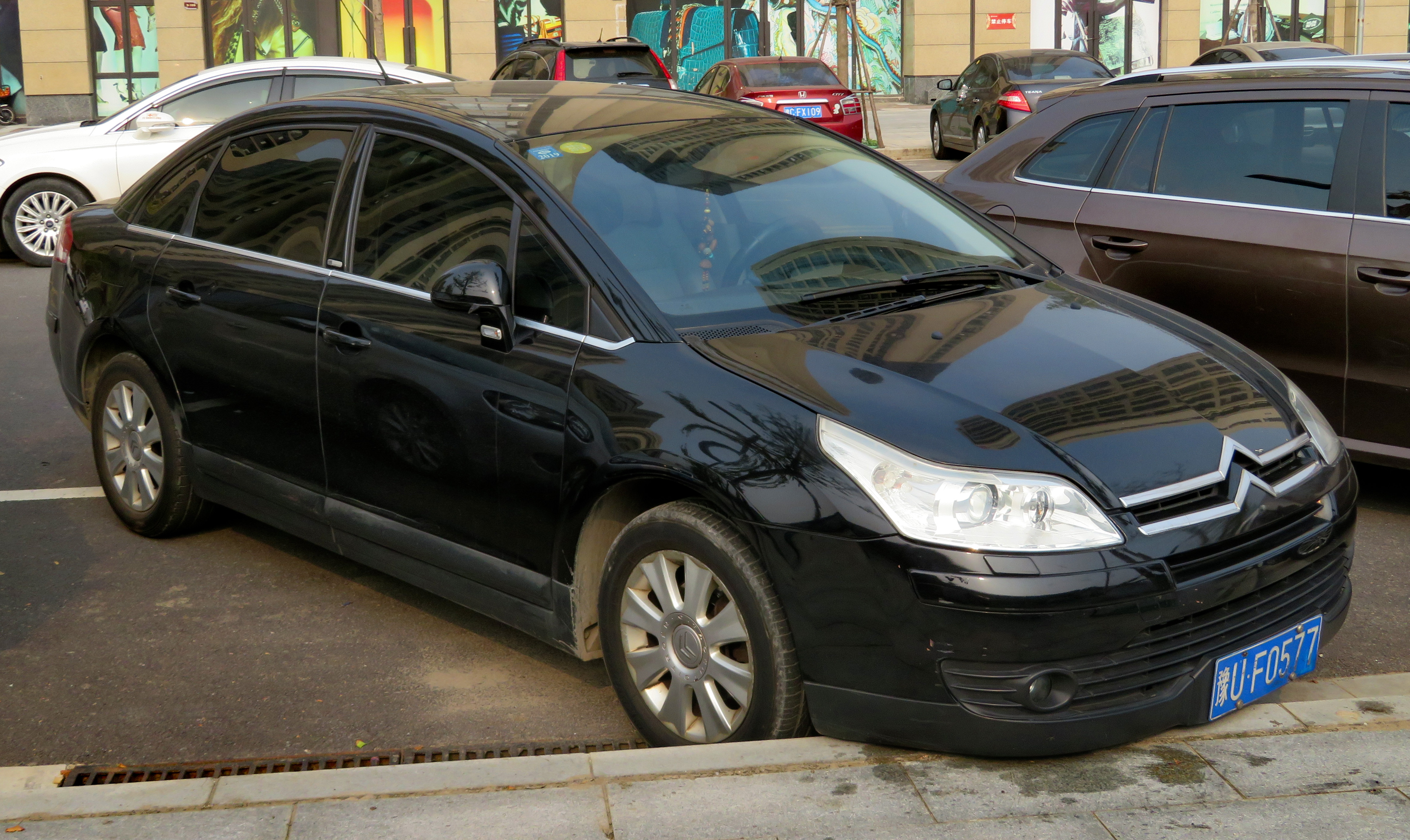
Citroën C-Triomphe

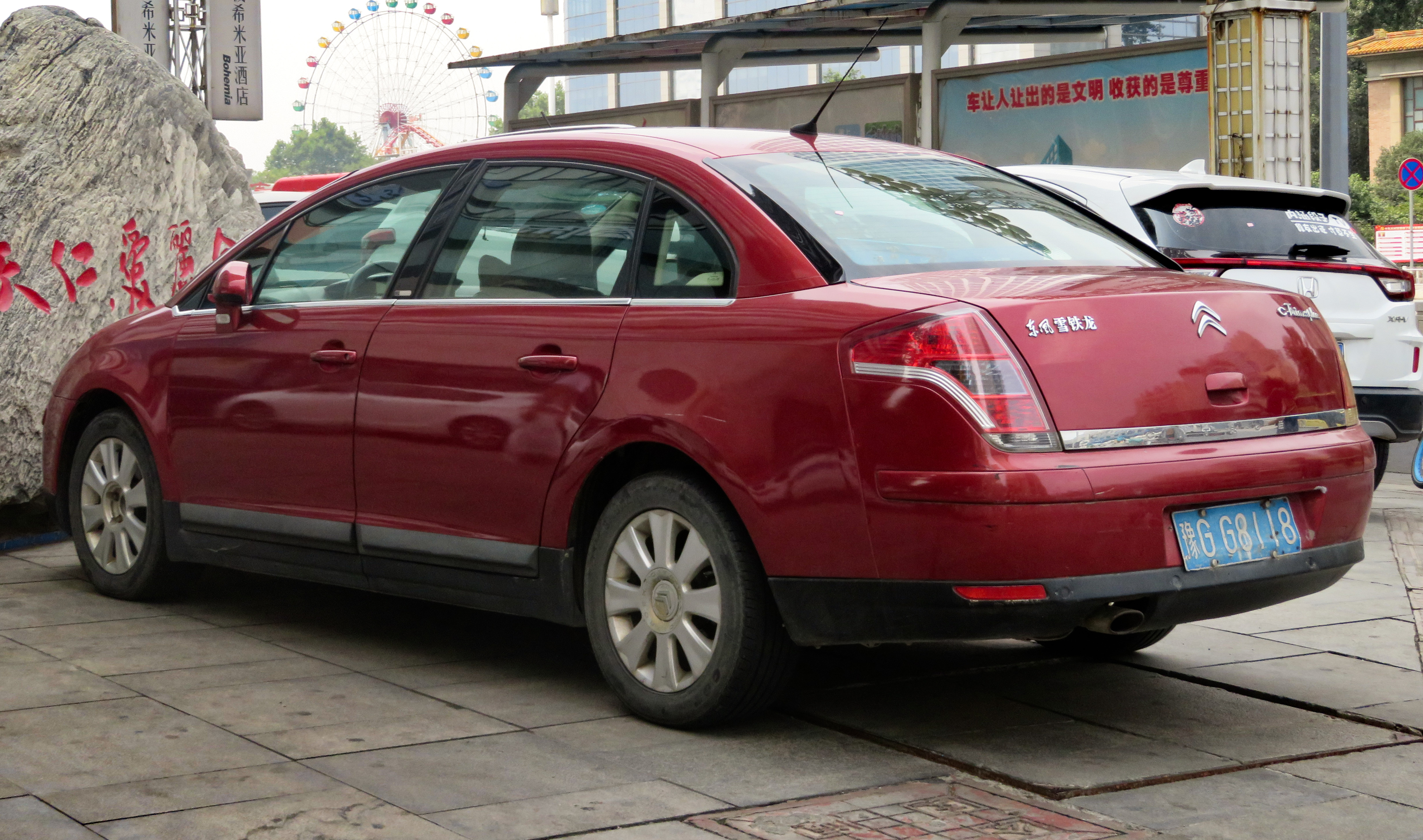
Citroën C-Triomphe

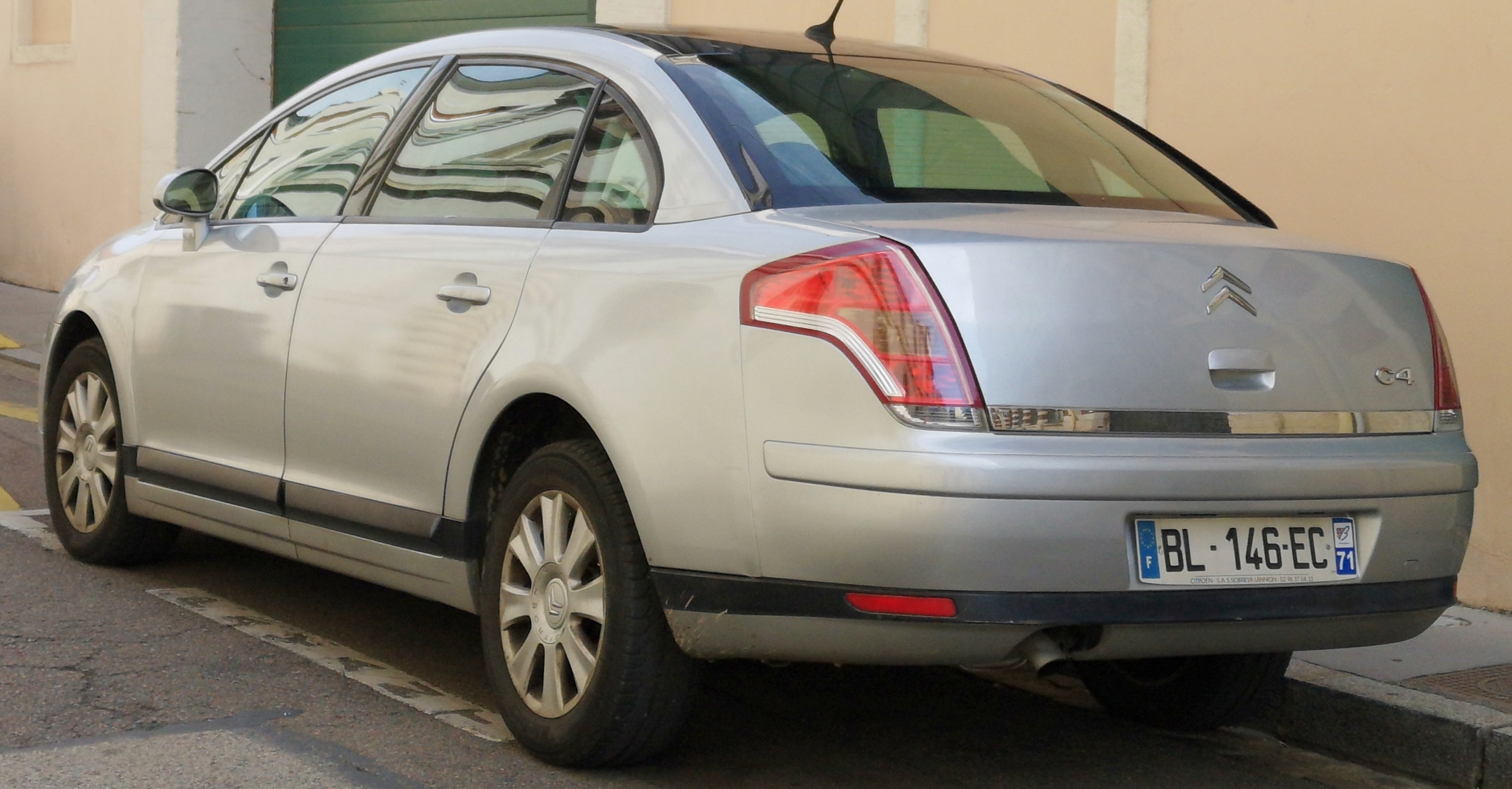
Citroën C4 Sedan

=== C-Quatre ===
In 2009, in China, the C-Triomphe was accompanied by the Citroën C-Quatre, a smaller (length 4,588 mm (180.6 in), wheelbase 2,608 mm (102.7 in)), cheaper, and more fashionably styled saloon version of the C4. A hatchback C-Quatre was also manufactured et sold locally. Late 2011, the hatchback got an offroad-looked variant called C4 Cross. In 2012, Citroën unveiled a new facelift version of the whole C-Quatre range at the Shanghai Motor Show.

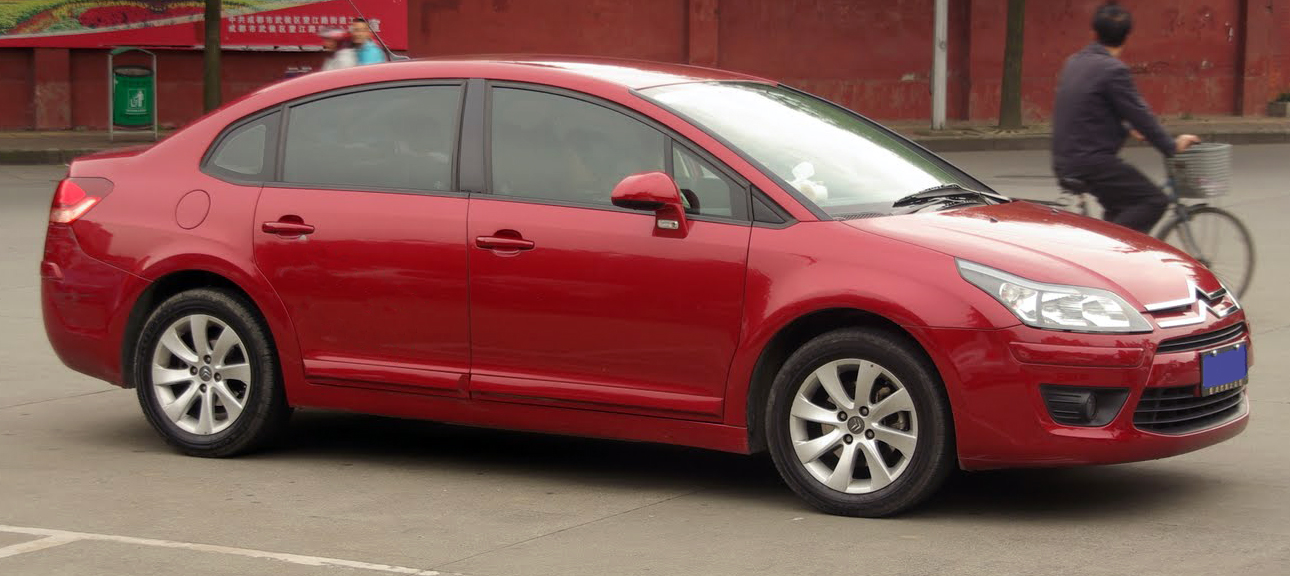
Citroën C-Quatre saloon (pre-facelift)

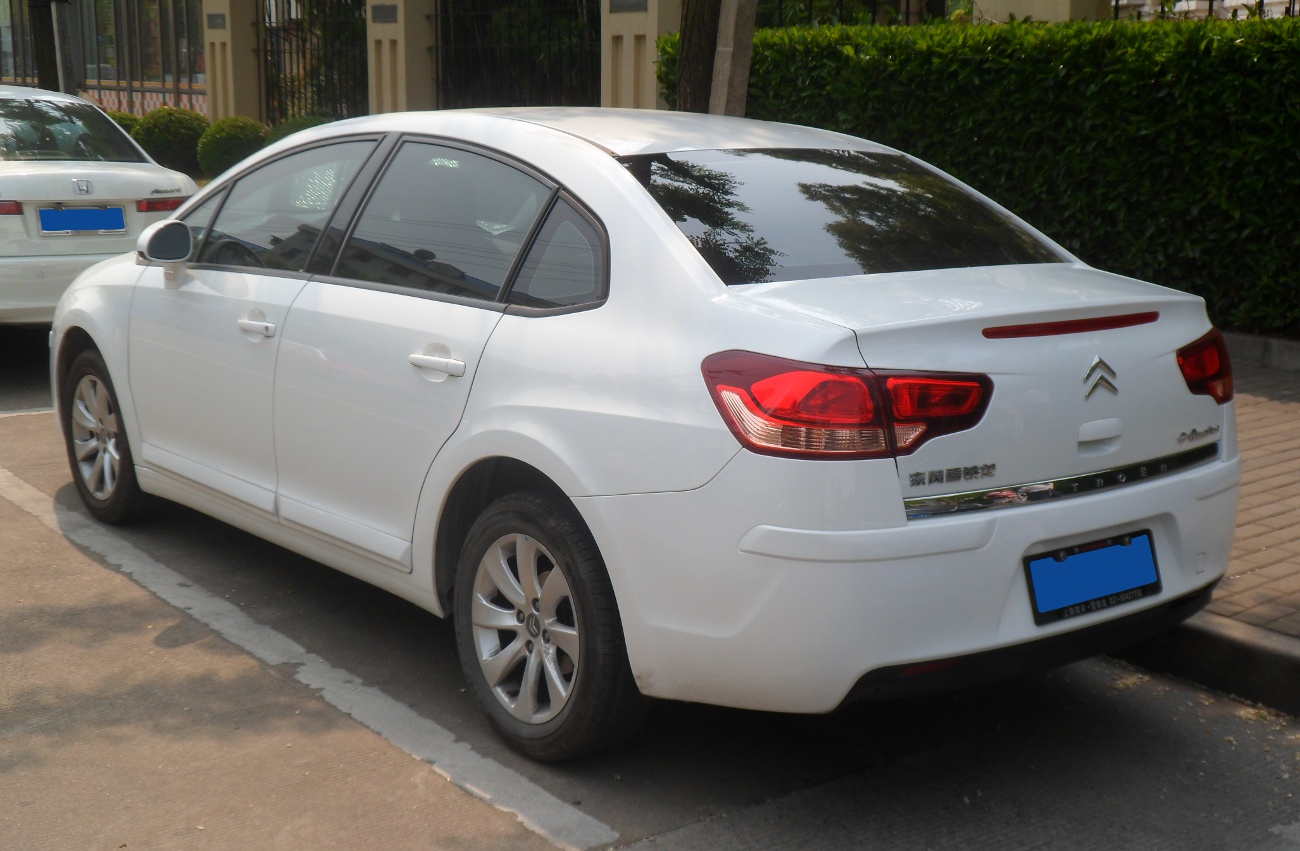
Citroën C-Quatre saloon (pre-facelift)

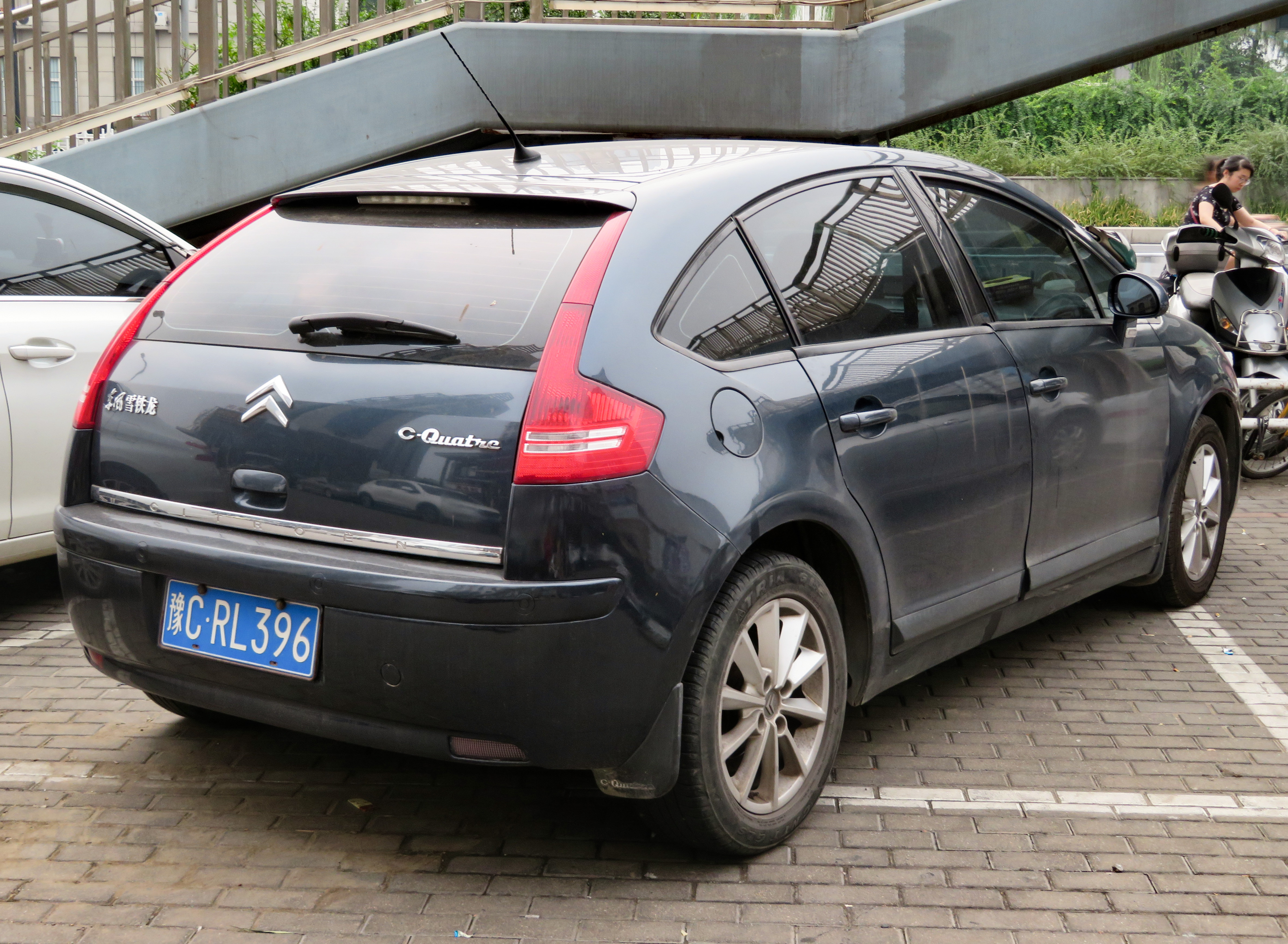
Citroën C-Quatre hatchback (pre-facelift)

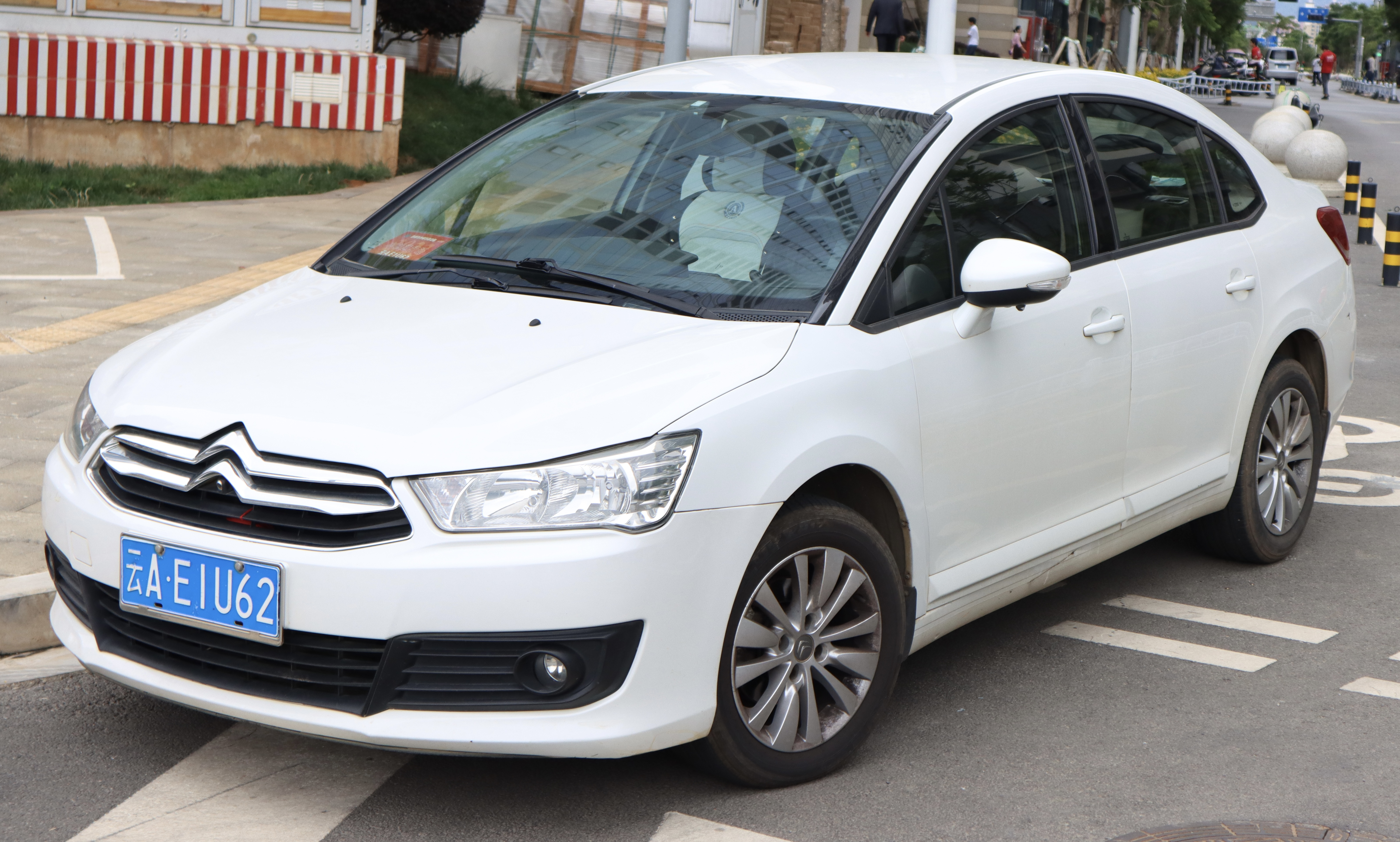
Citroën C-Quatre saloon (facelift)

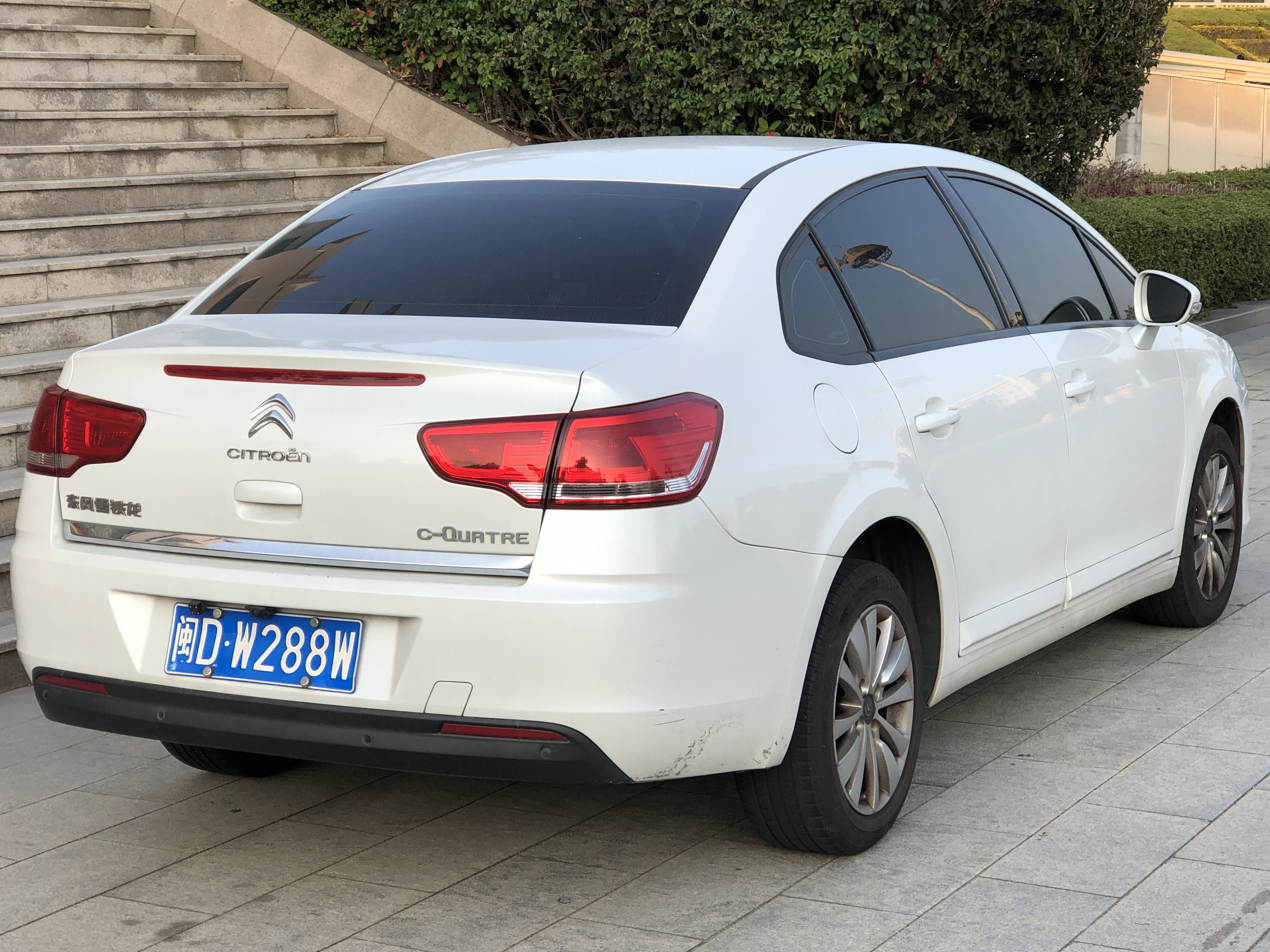
Citroën C-Quatre saloon (facelift)

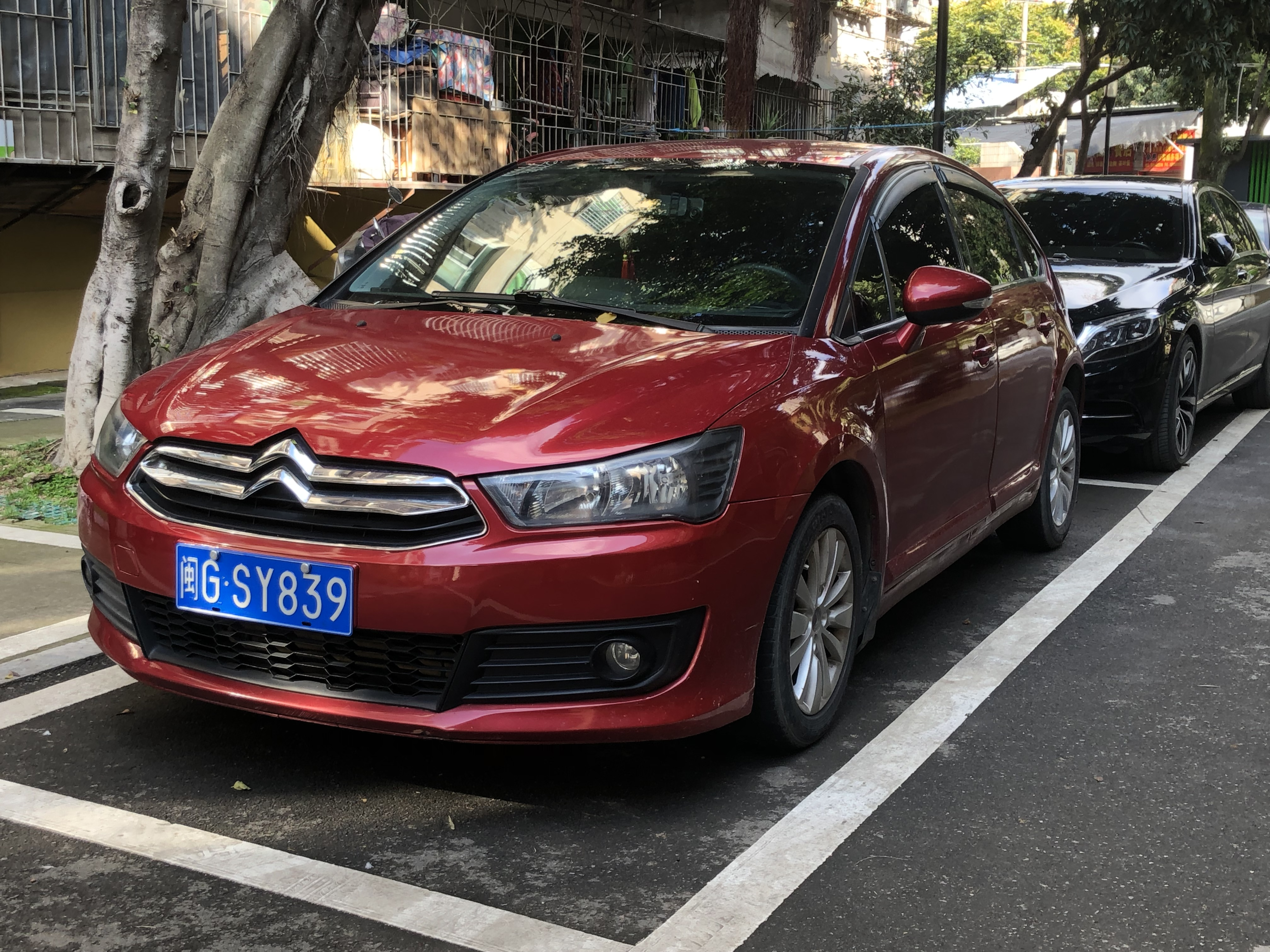
Citroën C-Quatre hatchback (facelift)

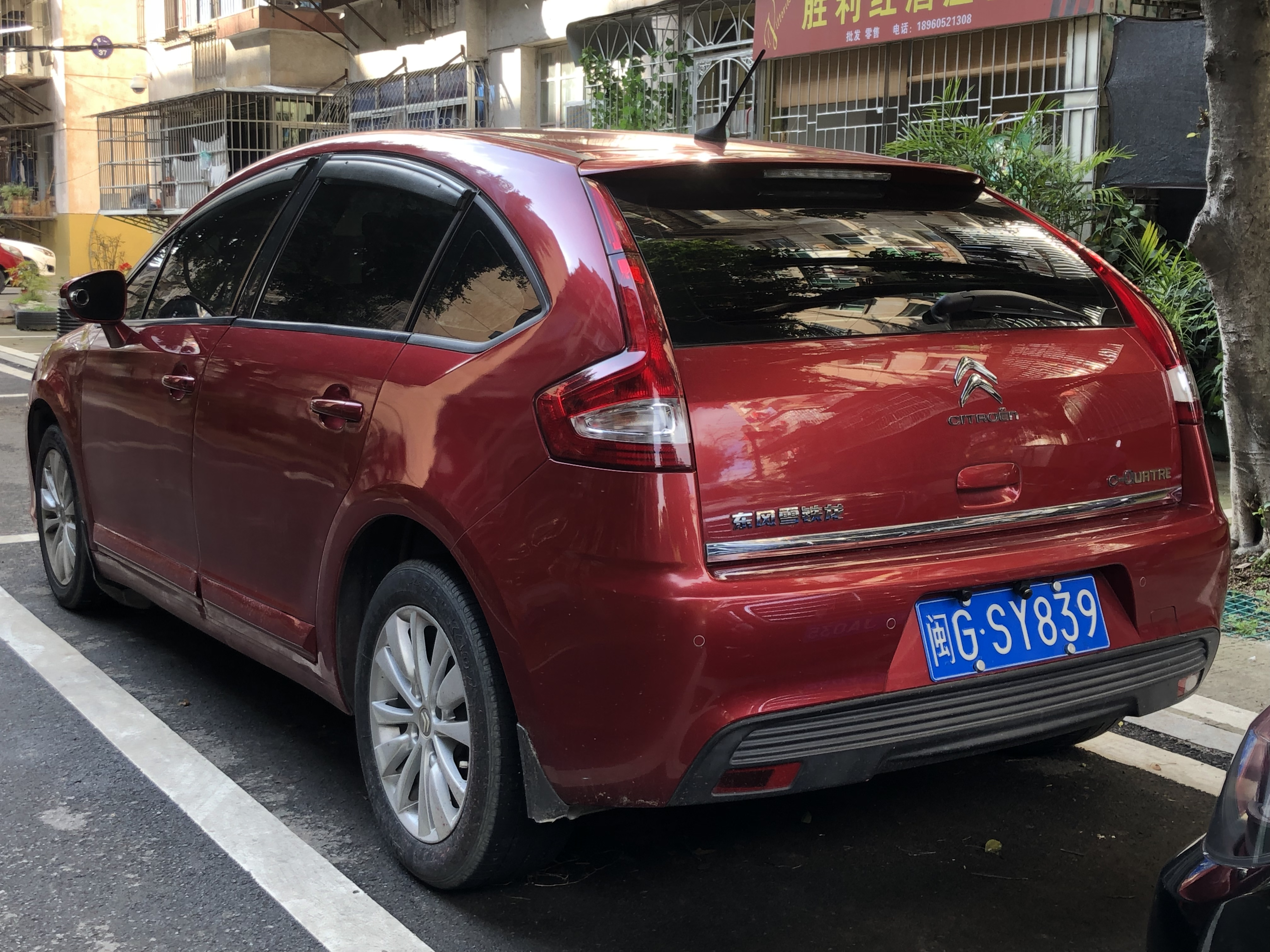
Citroën C-Quatre hatchback (facelift)

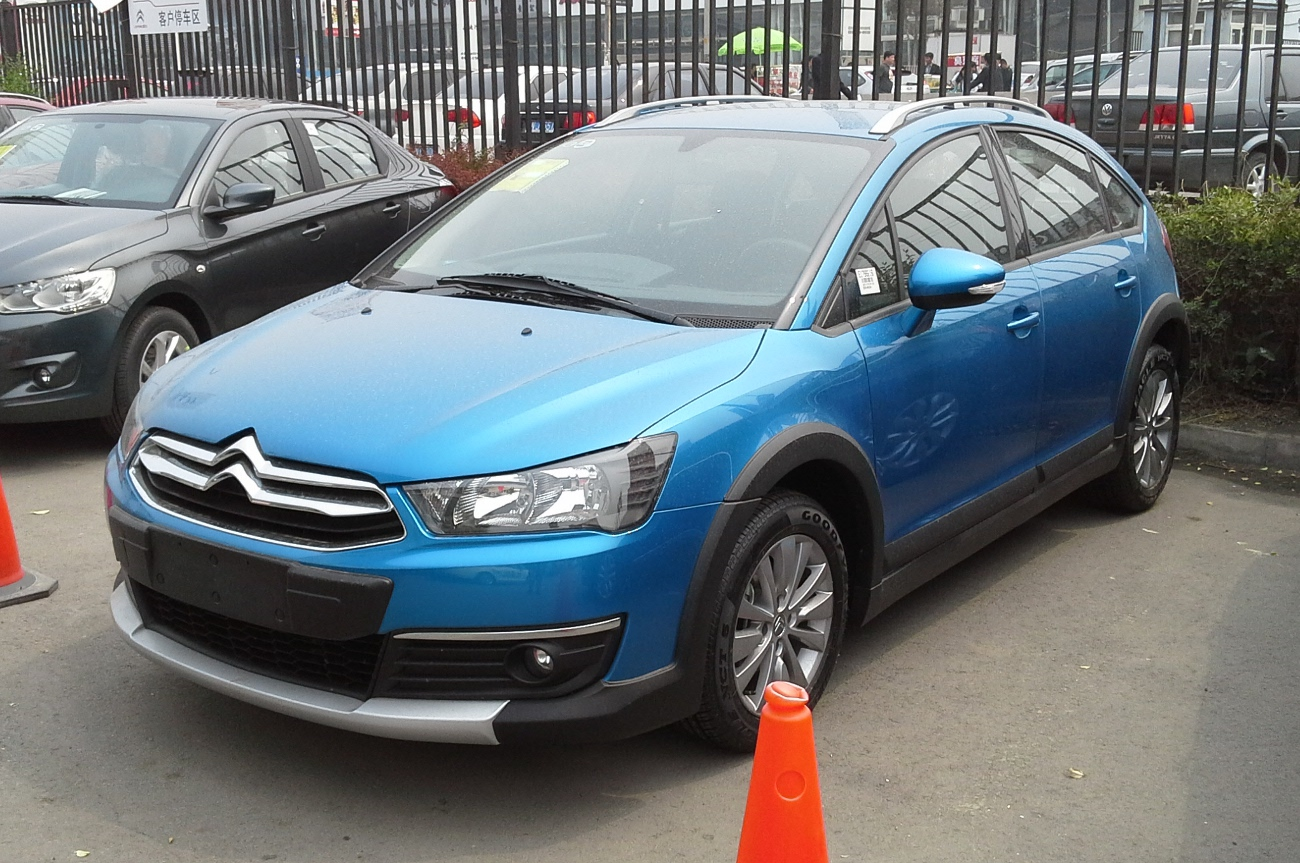
Citroën C-Quatre Cross (facelift)

=== C4 saloon (BZ3; 2015) ===
In China, a saloon version simply called Citroën C4 (or by its full name, Dongfeng Citroën C4 Sega, sometimes transcribed C4 Shijia) was available from 2015 to 2019. The Citroen C4 was based on the original Citroen C-Quatre (which it quickly replaced), with the same old platforms and the same wheelbase, and both cars also share the 1.6-liter base engine. Unlike the C-Quatre, the C4 was a failure in China, with 102,597 vehicles manufactured during its whole career. More 4-door C-Quatre were sold during the year 2012 alone.

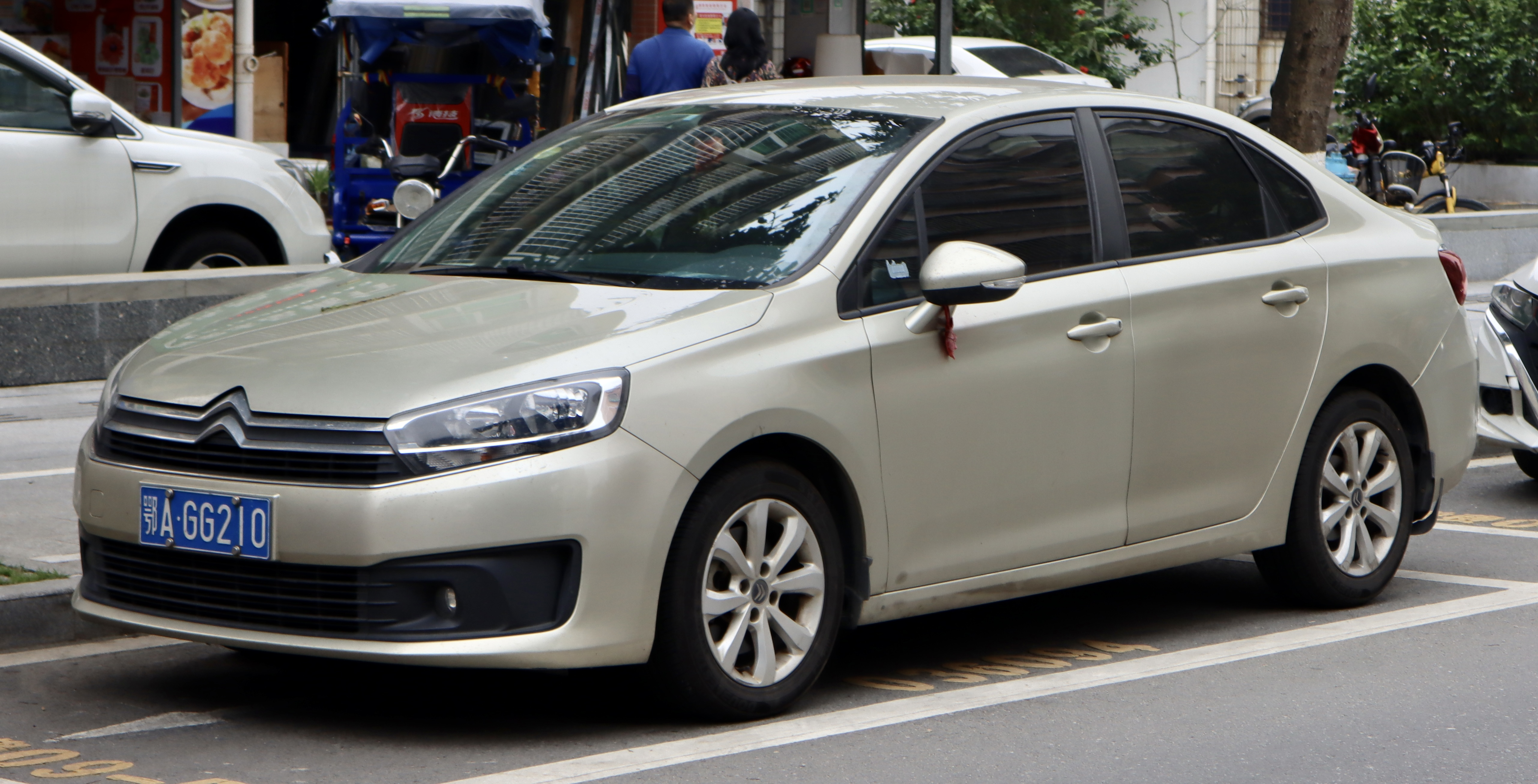
Citroën C4 saloon (China, front view)

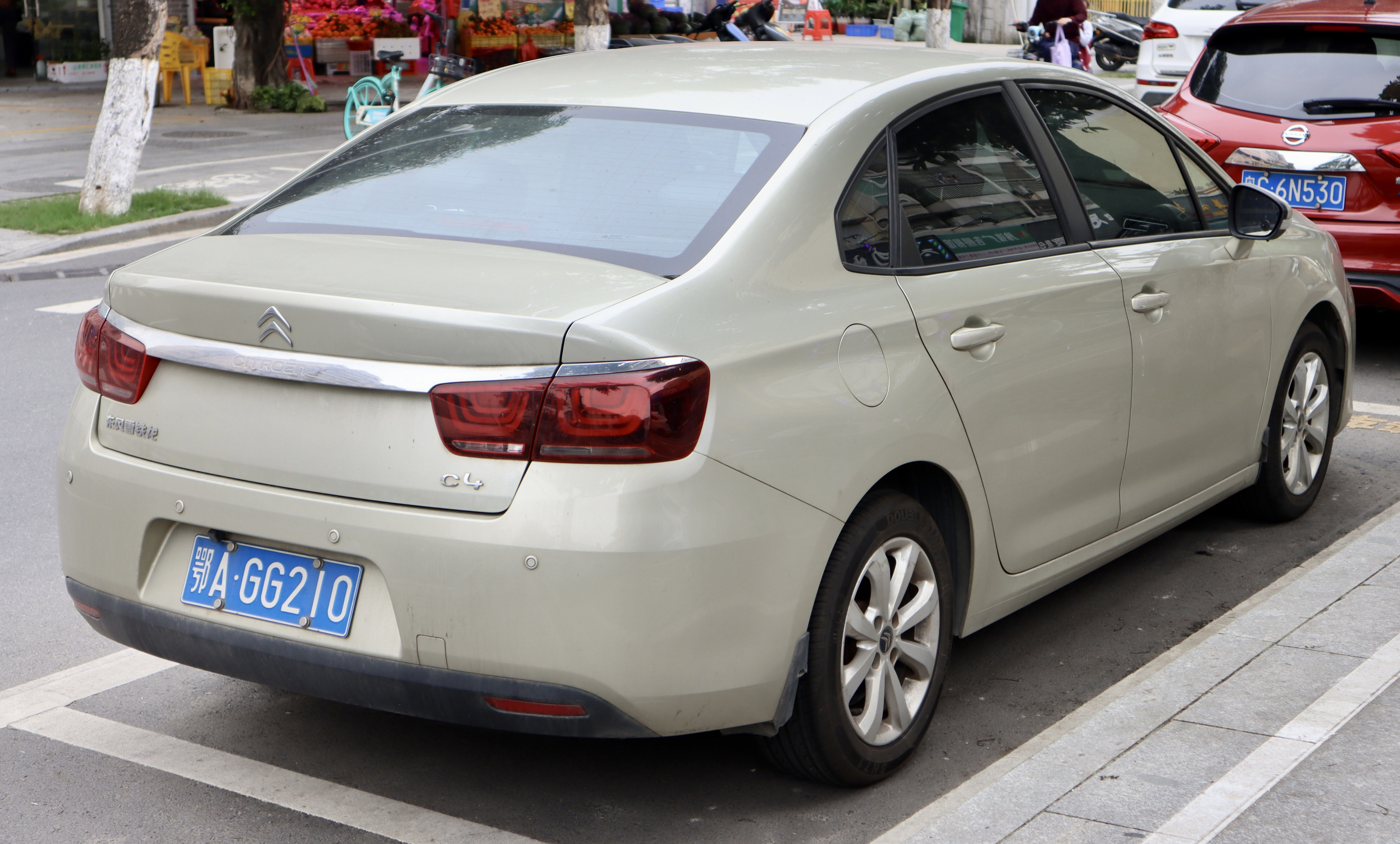
Citroën C4 saloon (China, rear view)

=== Picasso version ===
The C4 Picasso is the MPV version of the C4 range. It has been made available since 2006 in two versions: 5-seater C4 Picasso and 7-seater C4 Grand Picasso. The C4 Picasso received a facelift in 2010, with updated engine, headlights, and mechanics. The engine range is composed largely of the same version of the engine as used on the hatchback and coupé, plus the petrol 1.8, and was also available in bi-fuel (natural gas or LPG) in many markets.

=== Advertising ===
The car's advanced technology was the focus of a well-known television advertising campaign showing the car transforming into a giant dancing Transformer, accompanied by the song "Jacques Your Body (Make Me Sweat)" by Les Rythmes Digitales. At the end of the sequence, the robot transforms back into a car, over the slogan "Alive With Technology". The dance moves were based on the concept of a Transformers break dance routine, developed from moves recorded by the agents from Justin Timberlake's choreographer Marty Kudelka. Although the advertisement was produced by a music group from Canada, and the scenery was downtown Vancouver, the car is not available in North America. The entire sequence and scenery were digitally created. Apple Shake was used to digitally generate visual effects. This commercial has since been credited to District 9 director Neill Blomkamp.

The follow-up ad featured a similar transformer robot ice skating at high speed across a frozen lake, dodging around obstacles and executing a hockey stop in front of a group of engineers before transforming back into a car. It featured the song "Walking Away (Tocadisco Remix)" by The Egg.

The third ad broadcasting shows a third transformer robot sprinting along a road, changing to car form and back to robot form during the run. It features the song "Hungarian Dances" by Brahms. It is not on the Citroën C4 website.

The fourth ad featuring yet another transforming robot is being aired in Europe for the revamped C4. The robot struts through town showing off, accompanied by a cover version of the Bee Gees song "Stayin' Alive" by MC Lita.

In July 2007, filming began in São Paulo, Brazil, for a commercial for South America, starring North American actor Kiefer Sutherland and Argentine actress Araceli González. One month early, a controversial advertisement announcing the collision of an asteroid with planet Earth, given the appearance of real news, was used in Brazil to promote the release of C4 Pallas, and there is an asteroid named 2 Pallas.

A video game titled Citroën C4 Robot was developed by Istanbul-based developer 2GEN Studio and released on April 21, 2008. It is a free racing advergame in which the player can either create an account and try to beat another player's record or can play offline.

=== Engines ===
Petrol engines
Model	Body Style	Years	Engine	Displ.	Fueling system	Power	Torque	Transmission	Curb wt.	Top speed	0–100 km/h (0–62 mph)	Fuel cons. (L/100 km)	CO_{2} emission (g/km)
C4 1.4 16v	hatch, coupé	2004–2010	ET3	1360 cc	MPI	88 PS (65 kW; 87 hp) at 5,250 rpm	133 N⋅m (98 lbf⋅ft) at 3,250 rpm	5-speed manual	1,182 kg (2,606 lb)	182 km/h (113 mph)	12.8 s	6.4	153
C4 1.6 16v	hatch, coupé	2004–2008	TU5JP4	1587 cc	MPI	109 PS (80 kW; 108 hp) at 5,750 rpm	147 N⋅m (108 lbf⋅ft) at 4,000 rpm	5-speed manual	1,200 kg (2,600 lb)	194 km/h (121 mph)	10.6 s	7.1	169
C4 1.6 16v VTi	hatch	2008–2010	EP6	1598 cc	MPI	120 PS (88 kW; 118 hp) at 6,000 rpm	160 N⋅m (118 lbf⋅ft) at 4,250 rpm	5-speed manual	1,220 kg (2,690 lb)	195 km/h (121 mph)	11.4 s	6.7	159
C4 1.6 16v VTi	coupé	2008–2010	EP6	1598 cc	MPI	120 PS (88 kW; 118 hp) at 6,000 rpm	160 N⋅m (118 lbf⋅ft) at 4,250 rpm	5-speed manual	1,217 kg (2,683 lb)	195 km/h (121 mph)	10 s	6.7	159
C4 1.6 16v THP	hatch	2008–2010	EP6DT	1598 cc	turbo/GDI	150 PS (110 kW; 148 hp) at 5,800 rpm	240 N⋅m (177 lbf⋅ft) at 1,400-5,000 rpm	6-speed manual	1,276 kg (2,813 lb)	195 km/h (121 mph)	9.2 s	6.9	164
C4 1.6 16v THP	coupé	2008–2010	EP6DT	1598 cc	turbo/GDI	150 PS (110 kW; 148 hp) at 5,800 rpm	240 N⋅m (177 lbf⋅ft) at 1,400-5,000 rpm	6-speed manual	1,271 kg (2,802 lb)	195 km/h (121 mph)	8.4 s	6.9	164
C4 2.0 16v	hatch, coupé	2004–2005	EW10J4	1997 cc	MPI	136 PS (100 kW; 134 hp) at 6,000 rpm	190 N⋅m (140 lbf⋅ft) at 4,100 rpm	5-speed manual	1,262 kg (2,782 lb)	207 km/h (129 mph)	9.2 s	7.8	186
C4 2.0 16v	hatch	2004–2008	EW10A	1997 cc	MPI	140 PS (103 kW; 138 hp) at 6,000 rpm	200 N⋅m (148 lbf⋅ft) at 4,000 rpm	4-speed automatic	1,292 kg (2,848 lb)	206 km/h (128 mph)	10.1 s	8.1	193
C4 2.0 16v VTS	coupé	2004–2008	EW10J4S	1997 cc	MPI	177 PS (130 kW; 175 hp) at 7,000 rpm	202 N⋅m (149 lbf⋅ft) at 4,750 rpm	5-speed manual	1,337 kg (2,948 lb)	227 km/h (141 mph)	8.3 s	8.4	200

Diesel engines
Model	Body Style	Years	Engine	Displ.	Fueling system	Power	Torque	Transmission	Curb wt.	Top speed	0–100 km/h (0–62 mph)	Fuel cons. (L/100 km)	CO_{2} emission (g/km)
C4 1.6 16v HDi	hatch, coupé	2004–2008	DV6ATED4	1560 cc	turbodiesel; direct injection; common rail	90 PS (66 kW; 89 hp) at 4,000 rpm	215 N⋅m (159 lbf⋅ft) at 1,750 rpm	5-speed manual	1,257 kg (2,771 lb)	180 km/h (112 mph)	12.5 s	4.7	125
C4 1.6 16v HDi; Airdream	hatch, coupé	2008–2010	DV6ATED4	1560 cc	turbodiesel; direct injection; common rail	90 PS (66 kW; 89 hp) at 4,000 rpm	215 N⋅m (159 lbf⋅ft) at 1,750 rpm	5-speed manual	1,257 kg (2,771 lb)	180 km/h (112 mph)	13.9 s	4.5	119
C4 1.6 16v HDi (110CV)	hatch, coupé	2004–2008	DV6TED4	1560 cc	turbodiesel; direct injection; common rail	109 PS (80 kW; 108 hp) at 4,000 rpm	240 N⋅m (177 lbf⋅ft) at 1,750 rpm	5-speed manual	1,280 kg (2,822 lb)	192 km/h (119 mph)	11.2 s	4.7	125
C4 1.6 16v HDi; Airdream (110CV)	hatch, coupé	2008–2010	DV6TED4	1560 cc	turbodiesel; direct injection; common rail	109 PS (80 kW; 108 hp) at 4,000 rpm	260 N⋅m (192 lbf⋅ft) at 1,500 rpm	5-speed manual	1,280 kg (2,822 lb)	192 km/h (119 mph)	12.4 s	4.5	119
C4 1.6 16v HDi; CMP-6	hatch, coupé	2006–2011	DV6TED4	1560 cc	turbodiesel; direct injection; common rail	109 PS (80 kW; 108 hp) at 4,000 rpm	240 N⋅m (177 lbf⋅ft) at 1,750 rpm	6-speed automated manual.	1,280 kg (2,822 lb)	192 km/h (119 mph)	11.2 s	4.5	120
C4 2.0 16v HDi	hatch, coupé	2004–2008	DW10B	1997 cc	turbodiesel; direct injection; common rail	136 PS (100 kW; 134 hp) at 4,000 rpm	320 N⋅m (236 lbf⋅ft) at 2,000 rpm	6-speed manual	1,381 kg (3,045 lb)	207 km/h (129 mph)	9.7 s	5.4	142
C4 2.0 16v HDi; Airdream	hatch	2008–2010	DW10B	1997 cc	turbodiesel; direct injection; common rail	140 PS (103 kW; 138 hp) at 4,000 rpm	340 N⋅m (251 lbf⋅ft) at 2,000 rpm	6-speed manual	1,381 kg (3,045 lb)	207 km/h (129 mph)	10.5 s	5.3	139

=== Safety ===
ANCAP test results* Citroen C4 variant(s) as tested (2005)
Test	Score
Overall	5 /5 stars
Frontal offset	14.96/16
Side impact	15.60/16
Pole	2/2
Seat belt reminders	2/3
Whiplash protection	Not Assessed
Pedestrian protection	Adequate
Electronic stability control	Optional

== Second generation (B7; 2010) ==
Second generation
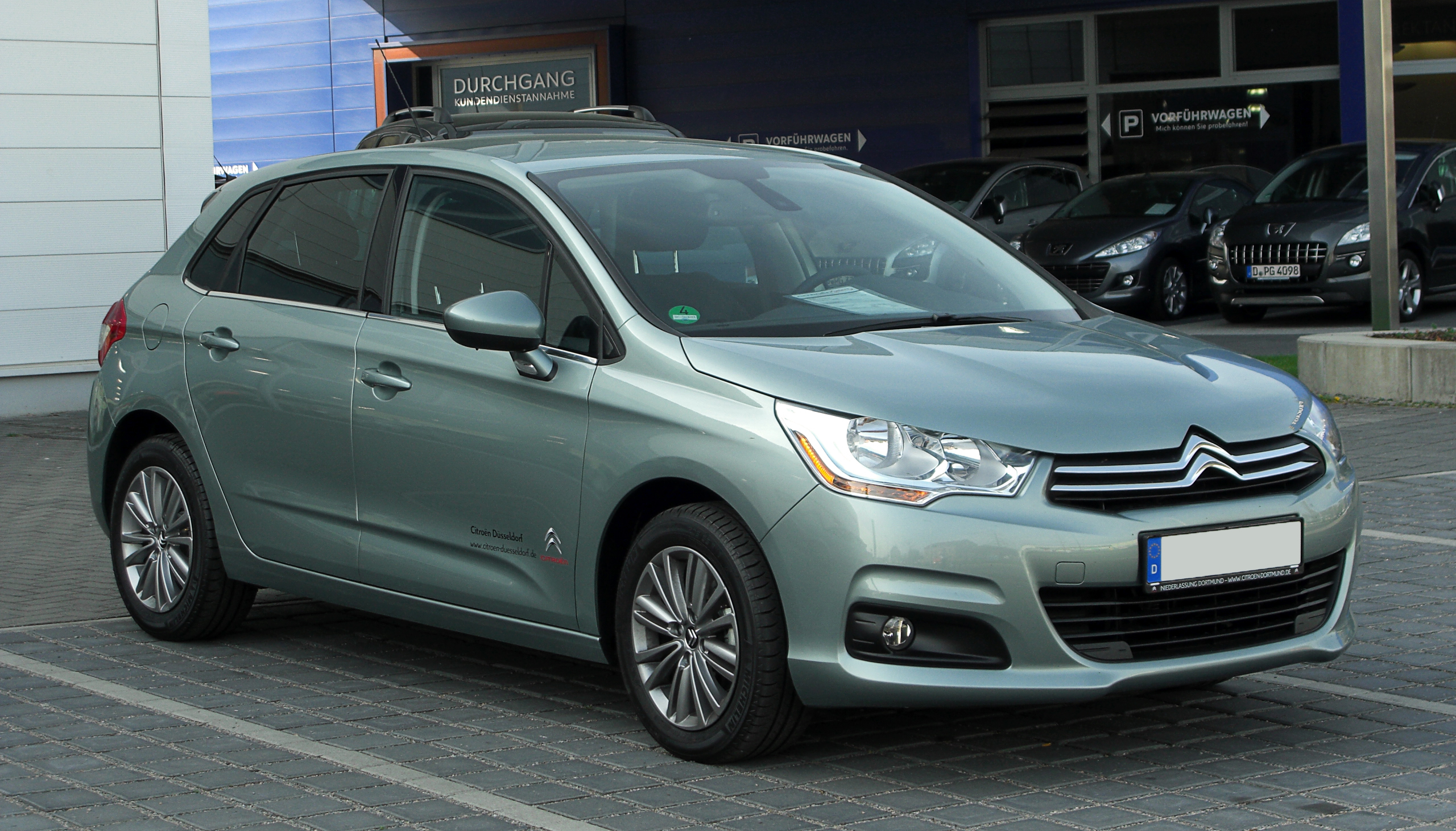

Overview
- Model code: B7
- Production: 2010–2018; 2010–2020 (C4L and C4, China); 2012–2021 (C4 Lounge, Argentina); 2014–2022 (C4 Sedan, Russia)
- Assembly: France: Mulhouse (PSA Mulhouse Plant); China: Wuhan (DPCA); Argentina: El Palomar; Russia: Kaluga (PCMA Rus)

Body and chassis
- Body style: 4-door saloon 5-door hatchback
- Platform: PSA PF2 platform
- Related: Citroën DS4

Powertrain
- Engine: Petrol: 1.2 L EB2 Puretech Turbo I3; 1.4 L EP3 VTi I4; 1.6 L EP6 VTi I4; 1.6 L EP6DT THP I4; Diesel: 1.6 L DV6 HDi/e-HDİ/BlueHDi I4; 2.0 L DW10 HDi/BlueHDi I4
- Transmission: 5/6-speed manual 6-speed automated manual (MCP); 6-speed semi automatic (ETG6); 6-speed Aisin AWTF-80 SC automatic (EAT6)

Dimensions
- Wheelbase: 2,608 mm (102.7 in) (hatchback); 2,710 mm (106.7 in) (saloon)
- Length: 4,329 mm (170.4 in) (hatchback); 4,621 mm (181.9 in) (saloon)
- Width: 1,789 mm (70.4 in)
- Height: 1,491 mm (58.7 in)

Chronology
- Successor: Citroën C4 Cactus

=== Debut ===
The second-generation Citroën C4 made its debut at the 2010 Paris Salon before it was launched in September. After its launch, it debuted at the Paris Motor Show in October 2010 and went on sale in Europe under the Citroën brand one month later. The new model was slightly bigger than the last and was only available with five doors. A three-door version was omitted by the French company because of the low sales of the previous generation three-door, and to avoid the risk of cannibalizing the DS3 sales. The derived first-generation DS4 (B75) was offered as a more stylish and luxurious alternative.

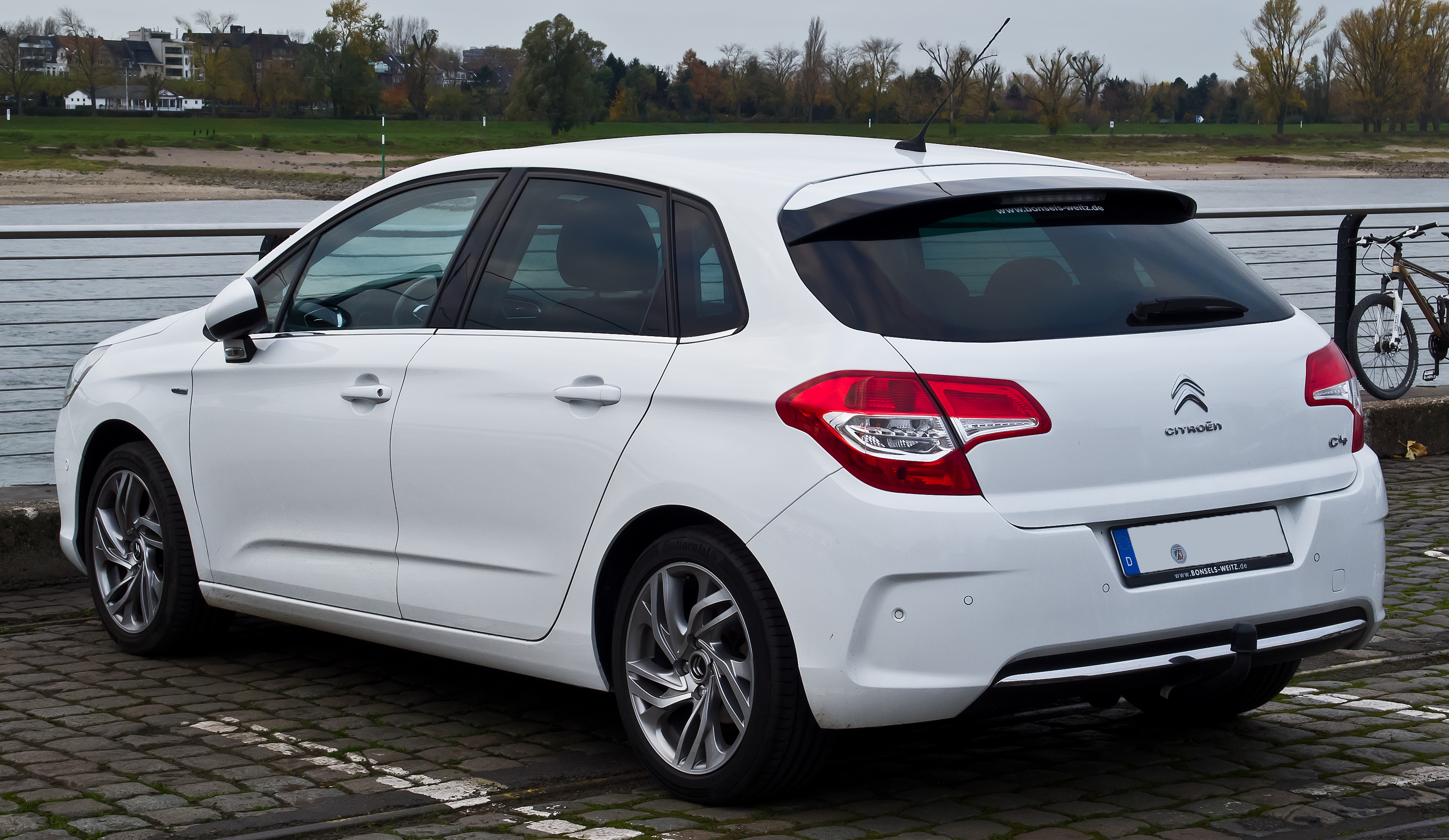
Citroën C4 hatchback (pre-facelift)

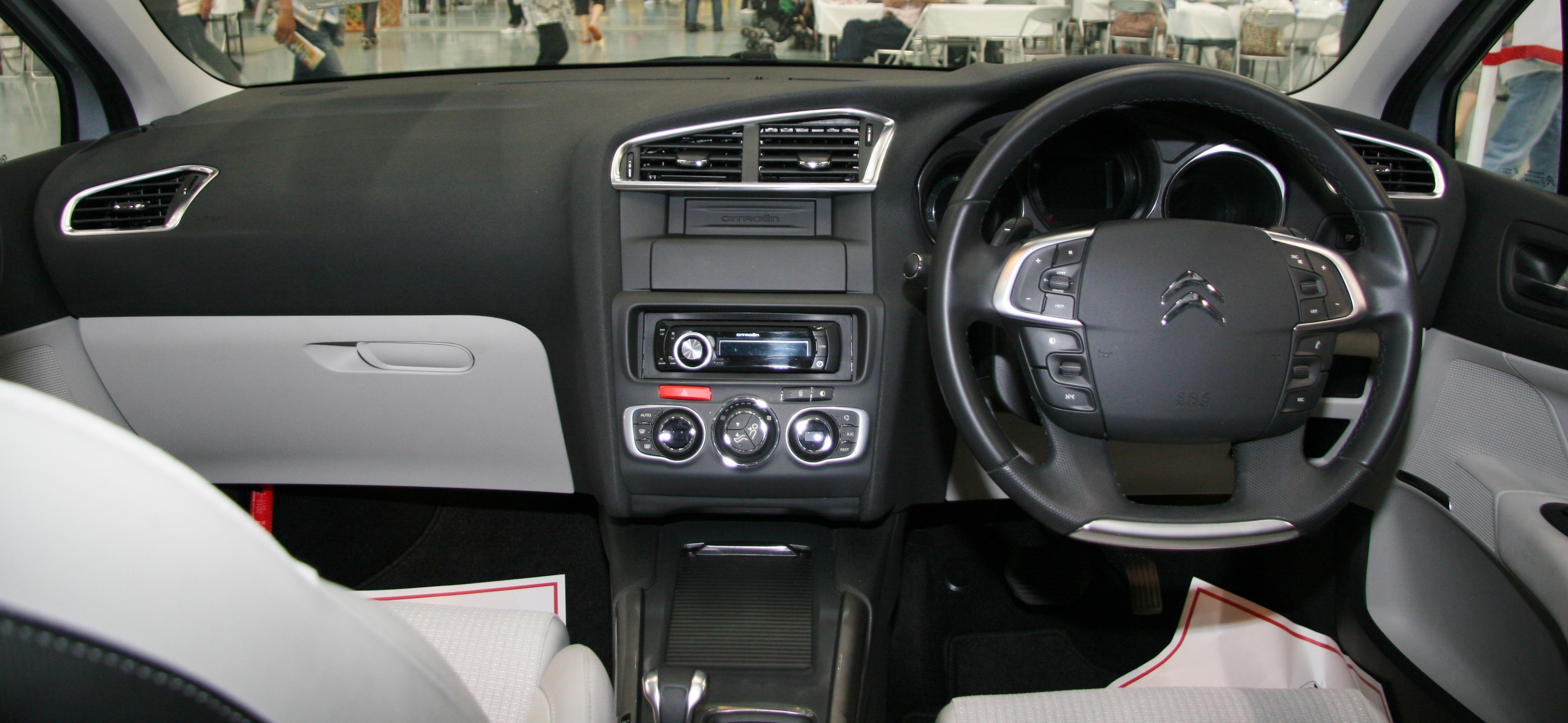
Interior (pre-facelift)

=== Design ===
Compared to the outgoing model, the average new design of the French line is less eccentric. In general, the lines are less rounded, the front is characterized by large clusters with aggressive design "cut" on the top and a "step" on the underside. Clearly visible in the front grille is the Citroën, formed by extensions of the central logo. The engine hood is made more aggressive by two longitudinal ribs, while the bumper, which is also aggressive, has a rather large mouth, flanked by two air intakes and two slots for the fog lights.

The side view shows two longitudinal ribs, one just above the line of door handles and the other at the bottom. The tail is characterized by clusters that penetrate partially into the side and partly in the boot lid. The large bumper appears massive from the rearview but at the same time, it raises the threshold for overload. The dashboard of the second C4 series is characterized by blue-lit instrumentation in different shades, combining analog and digital technology. The dashboard, with the now ever-present display, is also modern in styling, and has some ribs, especially at the top, which complement the external lines of the bodywork. The steering wheel doesn't have a fixed hub like the first generation. The seats have a sporty design, with padded side panels, but offer little lateral support. The sofa is divisible according to the now familiar pattern 60–40, but it is not tilting. The luggage compartment offers up to 408 liters for the standard, expandable up to 1,183, by lowering the rear seat backrest.

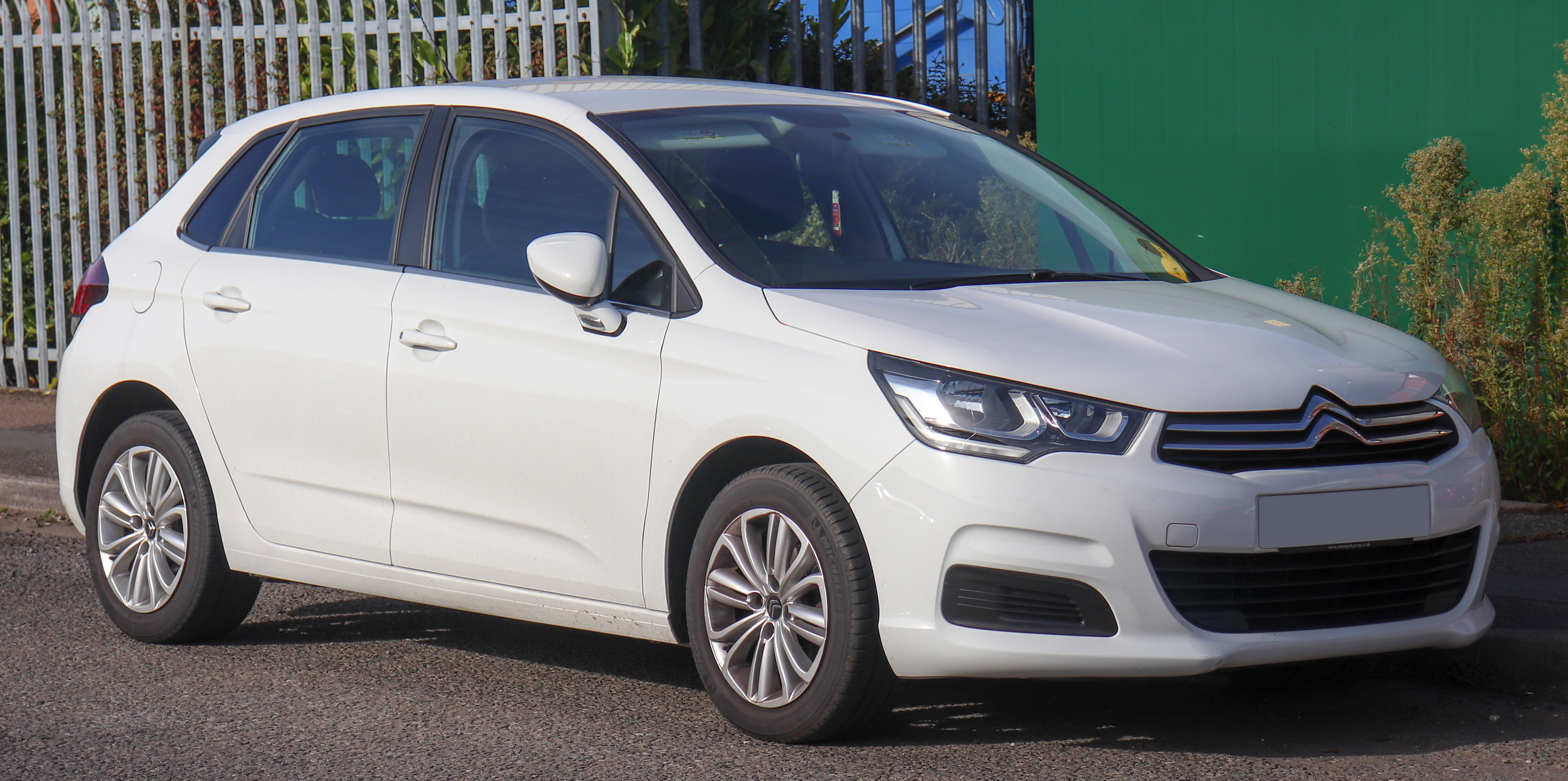
Citroën C4 hatchback (facelift)

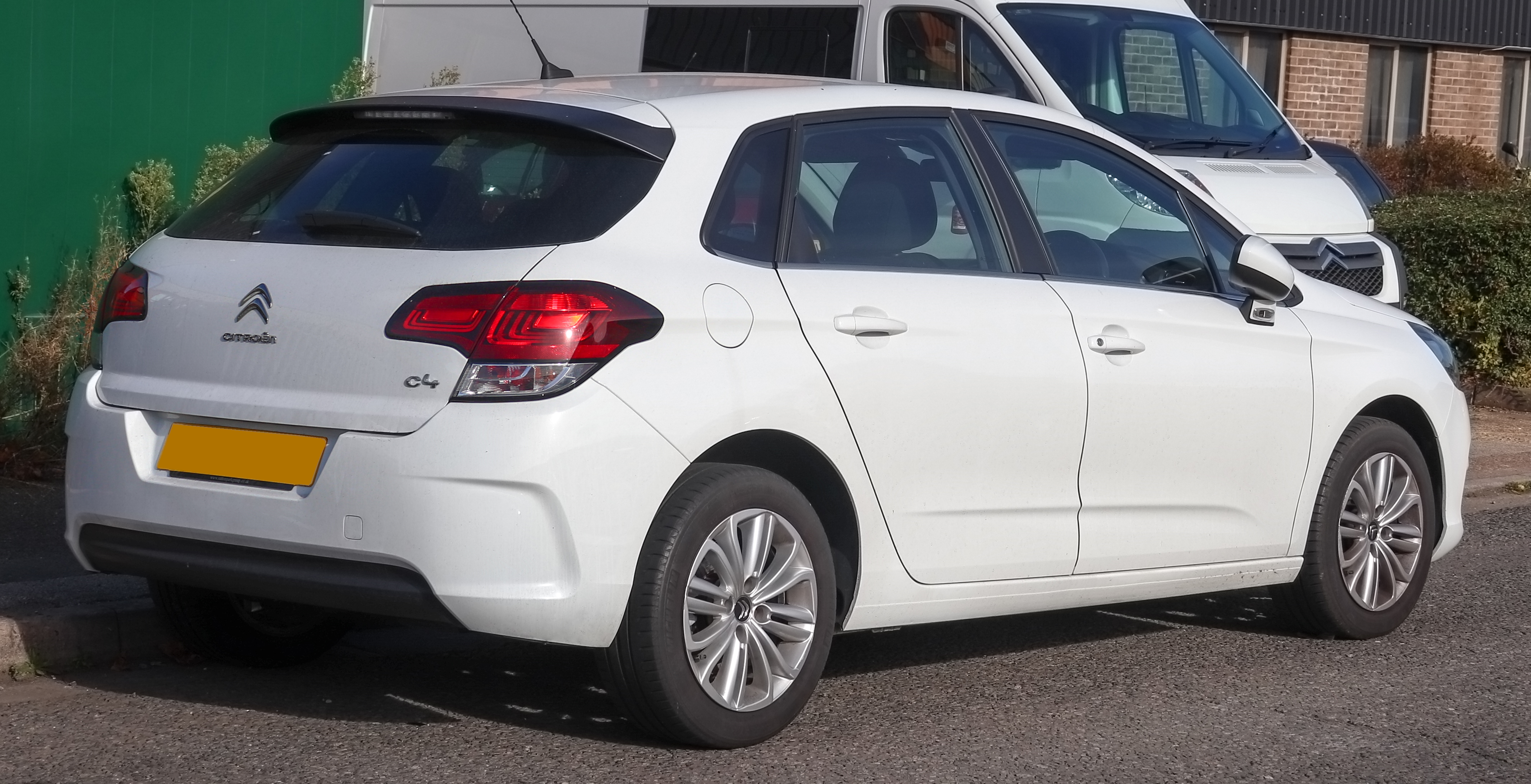
Citroën C4 hatchback (facelift)

The second-generation C4 received a facelift in 2015. The hatchback stayed in production until early 2018.

=== Engines ===
The second series of C4 is provided with specific tires with low rolling resistance, and out of the 200 kg of polymer used in each sample, about 30 are environmentally friendly.

The structure of the Mk2 C4, and C4-II, is derived from that of the first series: even the wheelbase was unchanged, but there are some new features in this case. To make the car more comfortable, suspension geometry was slightly modified, and new bushes are used, albeit still MacPherson struts in front and torsion beam at the rear. The brakes are disc all around, the front ones being ventilated, with ABS and ESP standard across the range. The rack and pinion steering with electro-hydraulic power steering is carried over from the previous C4. The engine range includes three petrol and four diesel engines:

- 1.4 VTi: 1397 cc, 95 PS (70 kW)
- 1.6 VTi: 1598 cc, 120 PS (88 kW)
- 1.6 THP: 1598 cc, turbo, 155 PS (114 kW)
- 1.6 HDi: 1560 cc, 90 PS (66 kW)
- 1.6 HDi 16v: 1560 cc, 110 PS (81 kW)
- 1.6 e-HDi 16v: 1560 cc, 110 PS (81 kW) with Start & Stop
- 2.0 HDi 16v: 1997 cc, 150 PS (110 kW)

The e-HDi engine, which debuted on the C4 (and simultaneously on the C4 Picasso based on the first series), is mated to a 6-speed automatic gearbox, as well as the 1.6 engine THP. The other engines are available with a manual 5-speed (1.4 VTi, 1.6 VTi and 1.6 HDi 92 hp) or 6-speed (1.6 HDi112 hp and 2.0 HDi). The 1.6 VTi is also available with a 4-speed automatic transmission.

=== C4L, C4 Lounge and C4 Sedan (B73; 2012) ===
At the end of 2012, Citroën unveiled the saloon version called "C4L". The saloon version was designed by the new PSA Style Centre in Shanghai. It is produced for the Chinese market in the Wuhan plant, and for the Russian market in the Kaluga plant.

The platform is the same as the C4 hatchback, with the wheelbase increased by 102 mm (4.0 in). The engine range was composed of the 1.6 VTI Prince THP from 155 to 170 hp (114 to 125 kW), and the new 1.8 VTI with 135 hp (99 kW) only for the Chinese market. All models are equipped with stop-start system.

The C4 saloon is manufactured in El Palomar, Argentina, and was planned for launch in the Latin American market in late 2013. In 2013, it contained 62% of regionally made parts.

The name of the vehicle is C4L in China, C4 Lounge in South America and C4 Sedan in Russia.

It was facelifted in 2016 for China and Russia, and in 2017 for South America. The design of the three versions has been standardized on the occasion of this facelift.

In 2019, the Chinese model received a new interior.

In China, the C4L was discontinued in 2020. The C4 Lounge was also discontinued in Brazil late 2020, but stayed manufactured in Argentina to sold in local market until 2021. The Russian market C4 Sedan was assembled up to 2022.

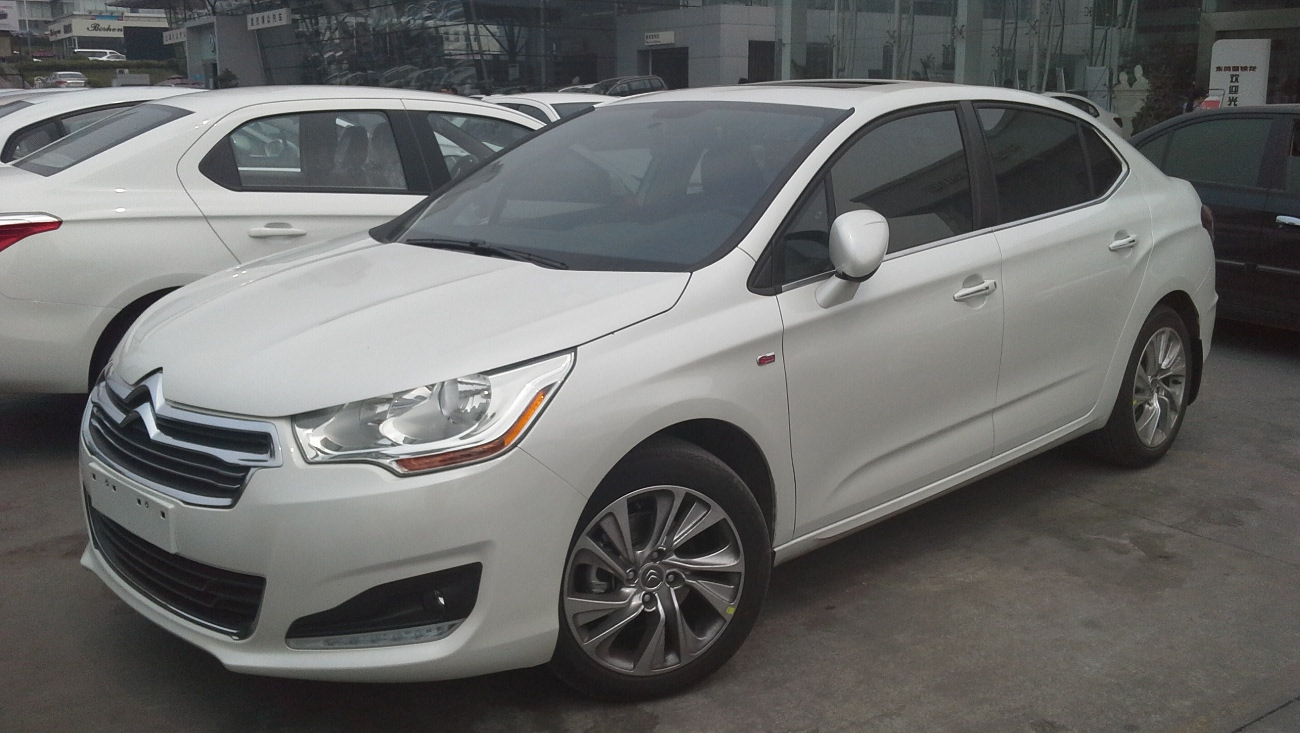
Citroën C4L (China, pre-facelift)

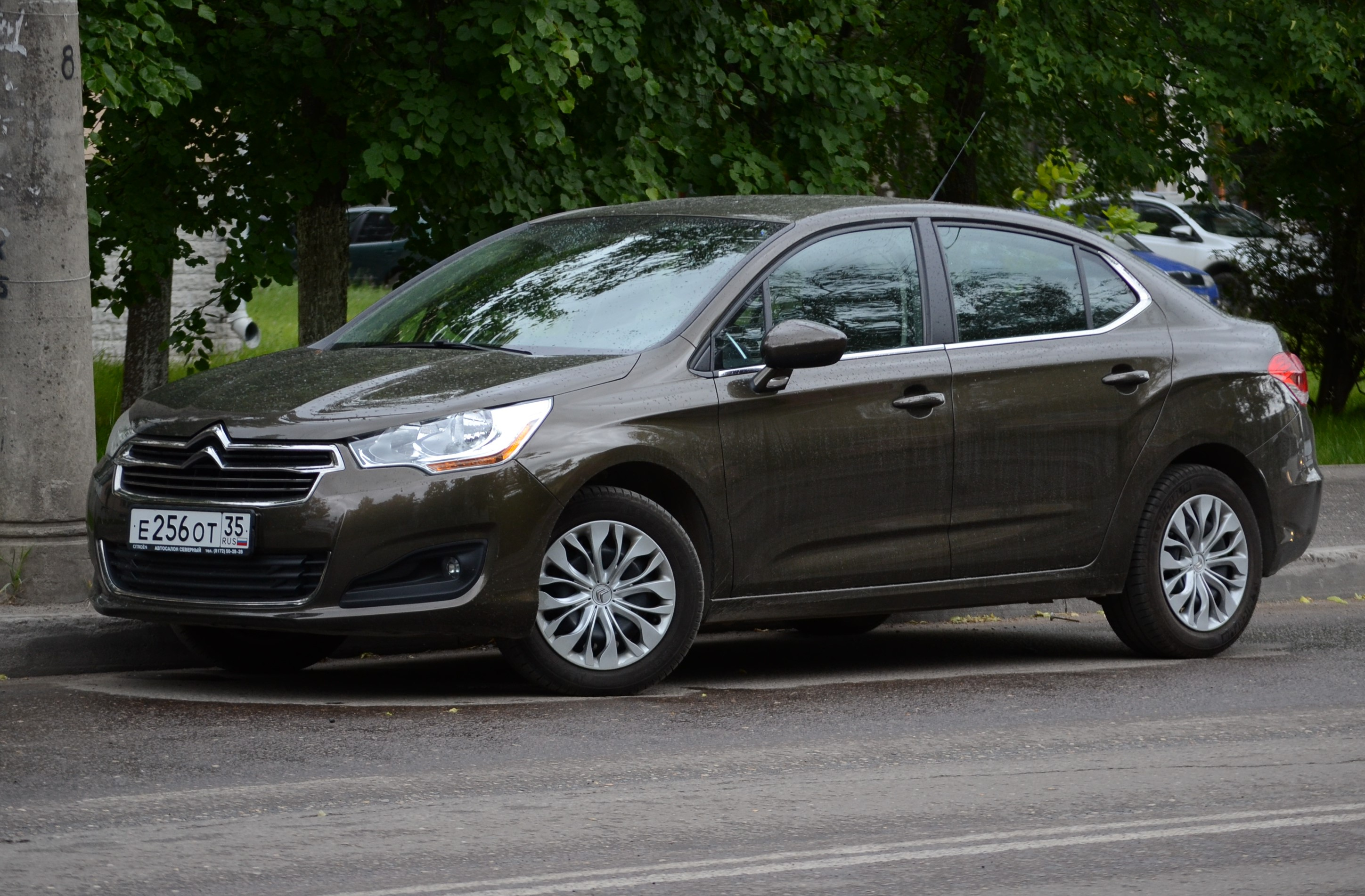
Citroën C4 Sedan (Russia, pre-facelift)

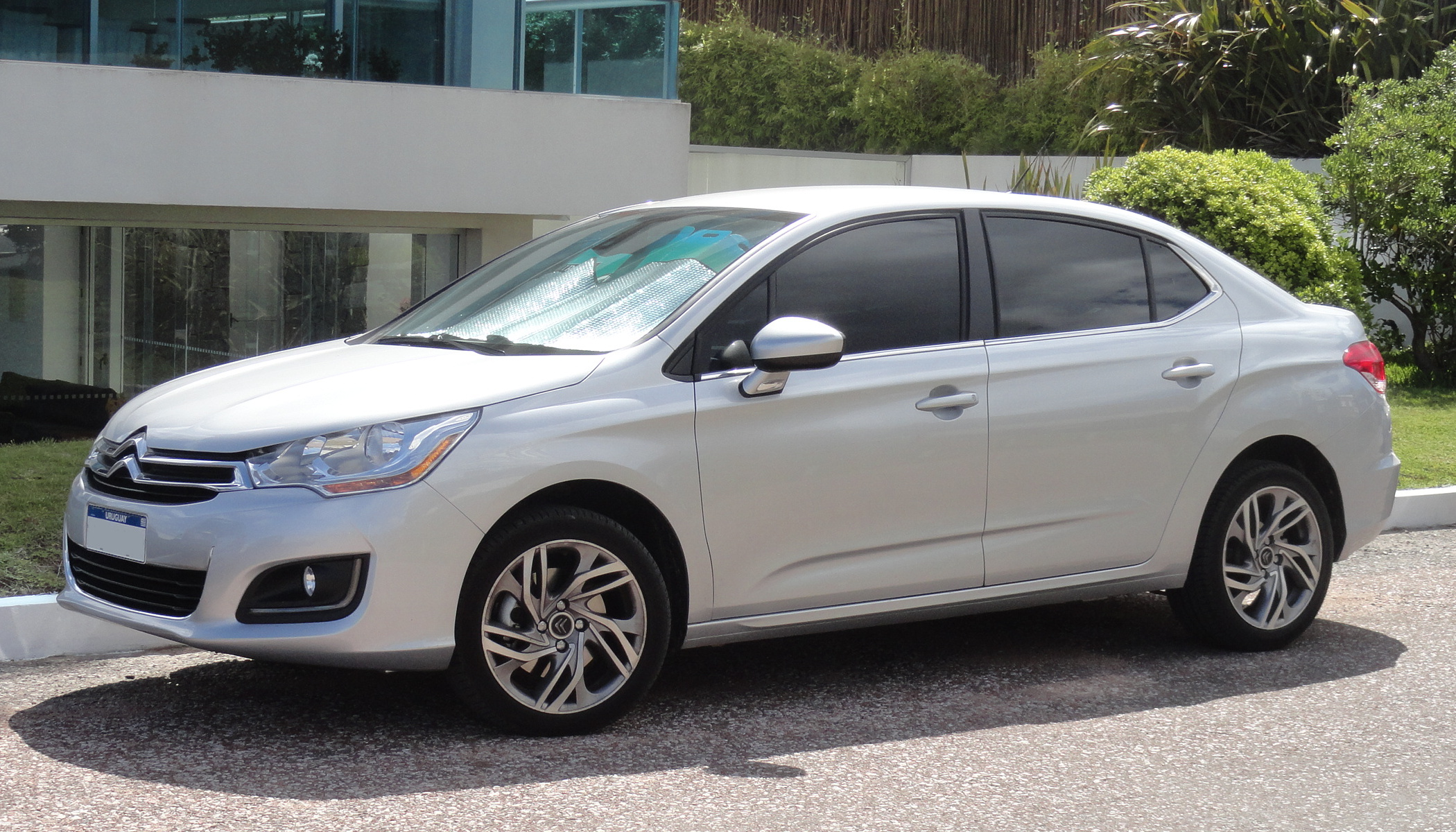
Citroën C4 Lounge (South America, pre-facelift)

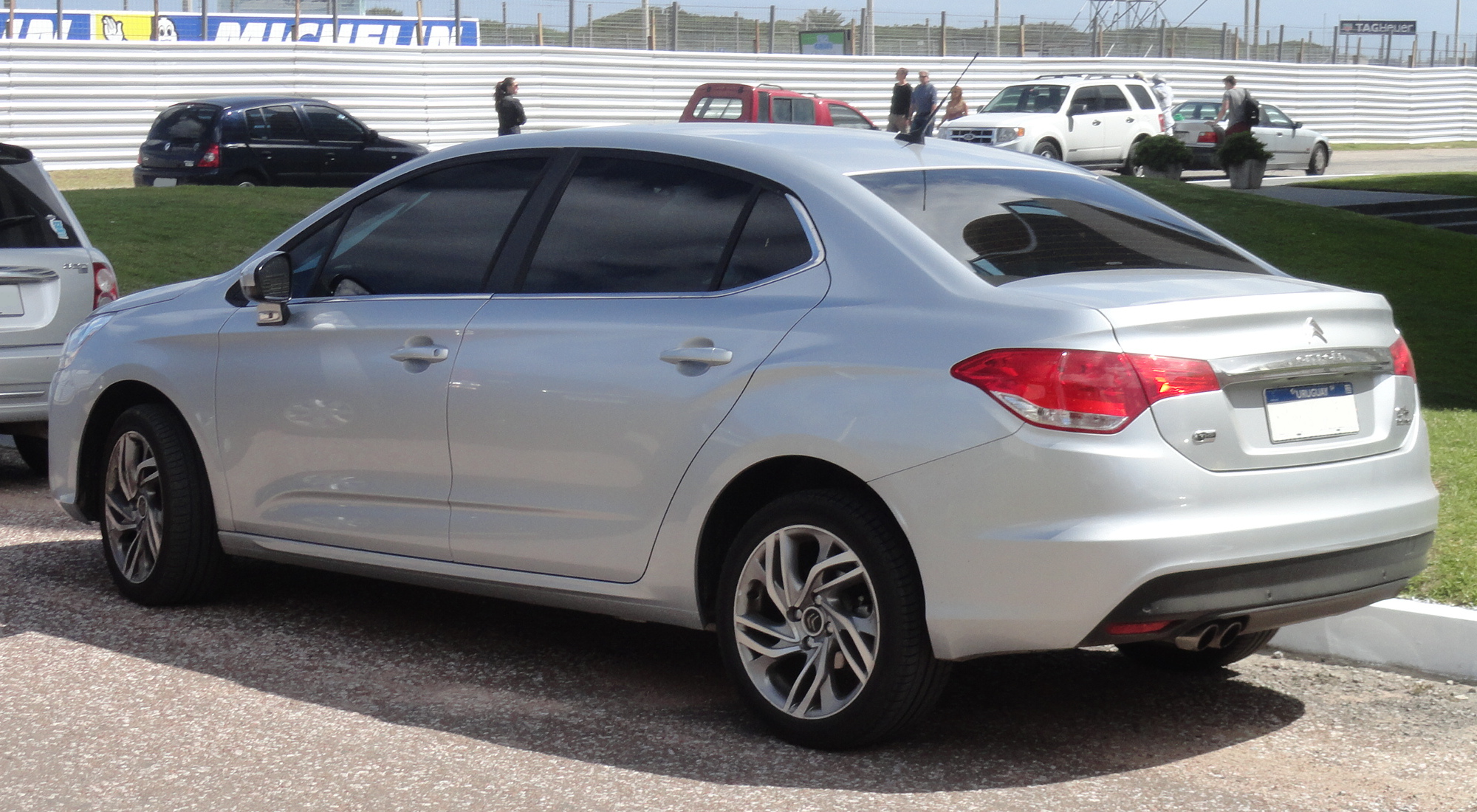
Citroën C4 Lounge (South America, pre-facelift)

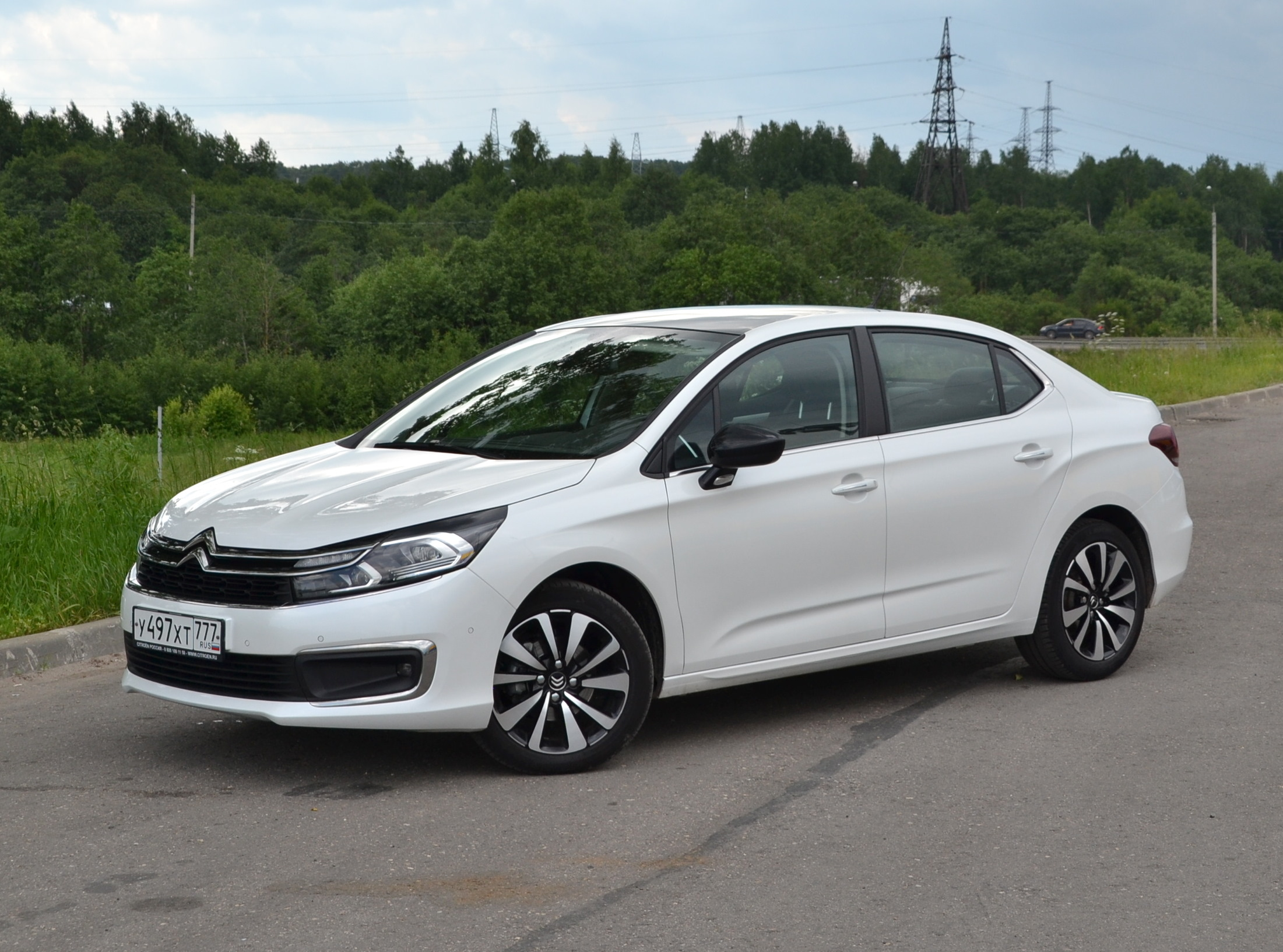
Citroën C4 Sedan (Russia, facelift)

=== Safety ===
ANCAP test results* Citroen C4 1.6L diesel engine variants (2011)
Test	Score
Overall	5 /5 stars
Frontal offset	15.25/16
Side impact	15.64/16
Pole	2/2
Seat belt reminders	2/3
Whiplash protection	Not Assessed
Pedestrian protection	Marginal
Electronic stability control	Standard

== Third generation (C41; 2020) ==
Third generation
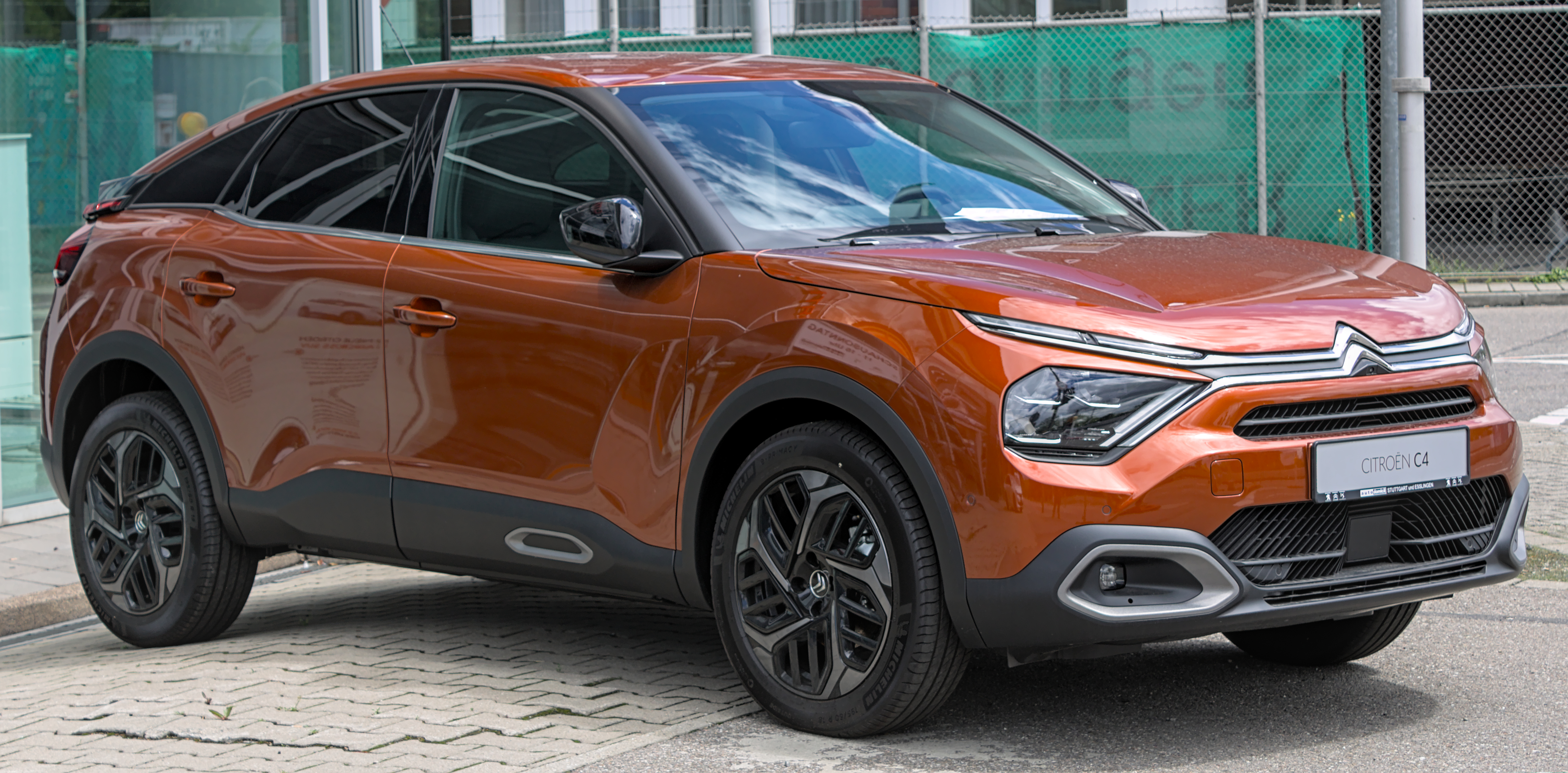

Overview
- Model code: C41 (C4); C43 (C4 X)
- Also called: Citroën ë-C4 (electric); Citroën C4 X (saloon)
- Production: 2020–present
- Assembly: Spain: Villaverde, Madrid (Stellantis Madrid Plant); Egypt: Cairo (Arab American Vehicles)
- Designer: Sylvain Henry (exterior)

Body and chassis
- Body style: 5-door coupe SUV (C4); 4-door sedan (C4 X)
- Platform: PSA EMP1 platform
- Related: Peugeot 2008; Peugeot 208; DS 3 Crossback; Opel Mokka; Opel Corsa; IKCO Reera

Powertrain
- Engine: Petrol: 1.2 L EB2ADTD/EB2DTS/EB2ADTX Puretech turbo I3; Diesel: 1.5 L DV5 BlueHDi turbo I4
- Electric motor: Permanent Magnet Synchronous Motor (ë-C4)
- Power output: List: 74 kW (100 PS) (1.2 Puretech EB2ADTD); 96 kW (130 PS) (1.2 Puretech EB2DTS); 100 kW (136 PS) (1.2 Puretech Hybrid e-DCS6); 96 kW (130 PS) (1.5 BlueHDi); 100 kW (136 PS) (ë-C4/ë-C4X); 114 kW (155 PS) (ë-C4/ë-C4X)
- Transmission: 6-speed manual (2020-2025); 8-speed Aisin UB81E automatic (EAT8); 6-speed dual clutch (e-DCS6); 1-speed direct-drive (ë-C4)
- Battery: 50 kWh; 54 kWh
- Electric range: 350–415 km (217–258 mi)

Dimensions
- Wheelbase: 2,670 mm (105.1 in)
- Length: 4,360 mm (171.7 in) (C4); 4,600 mm (181.1 in) (C4 X)
- Width: 1,834 mm (72.2 in)
- Height: 1,525 mm (60.0 in)

Chronology
- Predecessor: Citroën C4 Cactus; Citroën DS4; Citroën C4L/C4 Lounge/C4 Sedan (for C4 X); Citroën C-Elysée (for C4 X)

The third-generation C4 (C41) was revealed on 16 June 2020 with a coupe SUV styling. The interior receives a significant upgrade, as there are more upmarket materials and a larger, wider touchscreen. The new C4 and ë-C4 are larger and based on an all-new EMP1 platform shared with the DS 3 Crossback, Opel Mokka, Opel Corsa, Peugeot 2008 and Peugeot 208.

A four-door fastback-styling saloon version called the C4 X was unveiled on 29 June 2022.

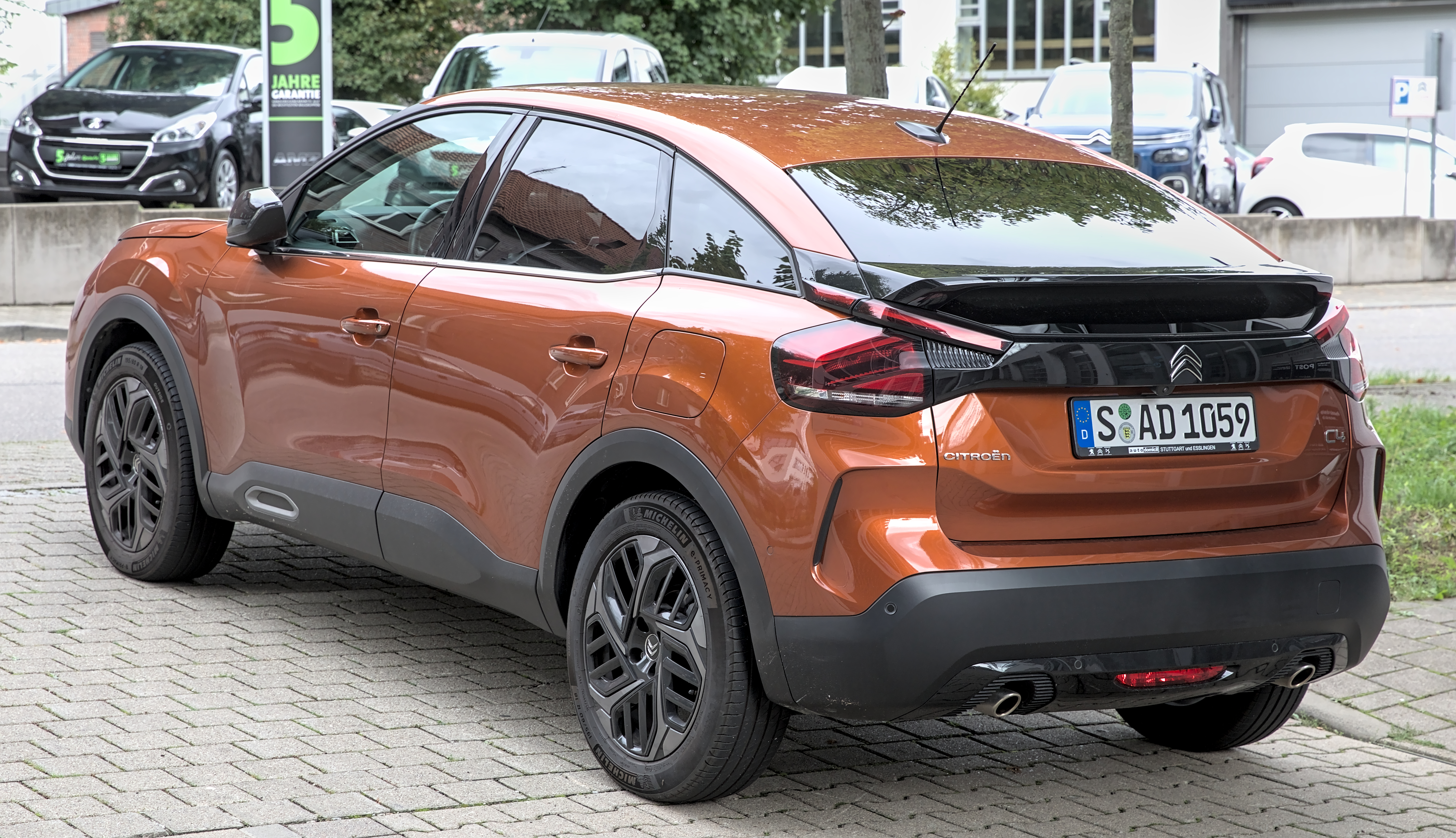
Rear view (pre-facelift)

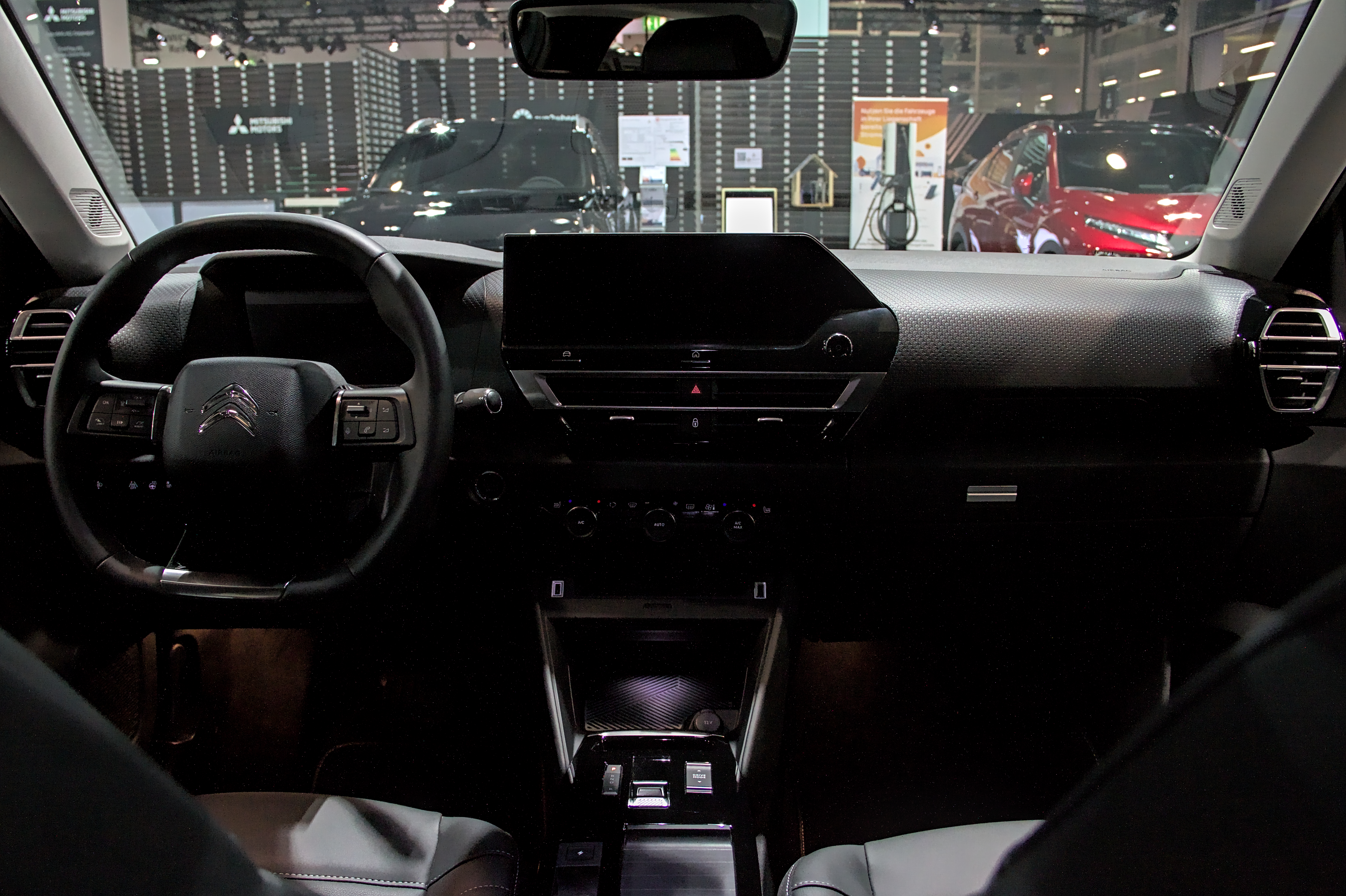
Interior (pre-facelift)

=== ë-C4 ===
The electric drive version, named the ë-C4, features a 100 kW (134 hp) electric motor and a 50 kWh battery, capable of 350 km (217 mi) of range under the WLTP test.

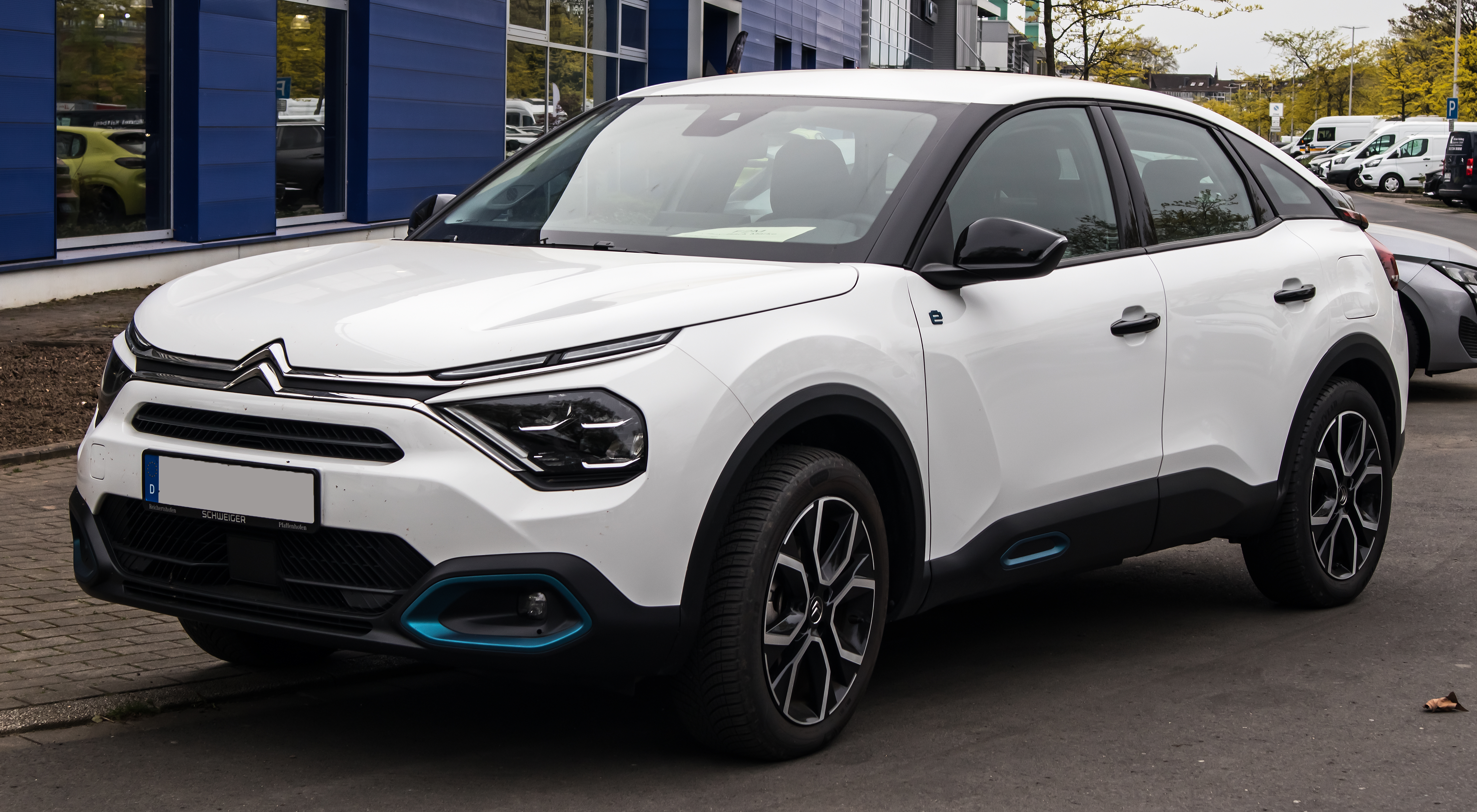
Citroën ë-C4 (pre-facelift)

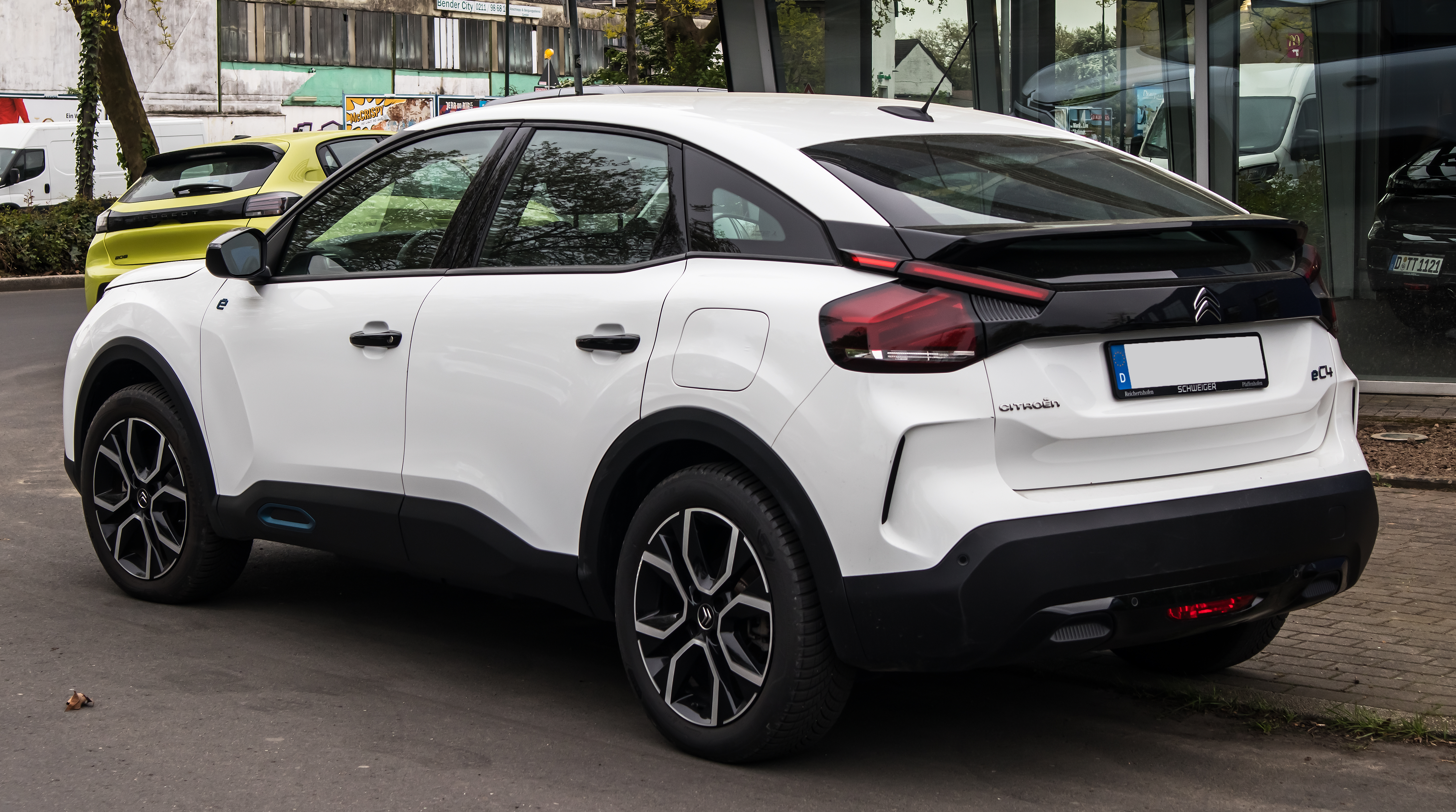
Rear view (pre-facelift)

=== C4 X and ë-C4 X (C43; 2022) ===
A longer variation of the C4 with a sedan body style, called the C4 X, was unveiled in June 2022. It is the first Citroën to be designed under Pierre Leclercq supervision. According to Citroën, the C4 X merges the elements of a fastback, a 4-door saloon and an SUV.

The C4 and the C4 X have the same wheelbase. Using the traditional sedan-style boot opening, the cargo capacity has been increased from 380 L (84 imp gal) in the C4 to 510 L (110 imp gal) in the C4 X.

An electric version, called ë-C4 X, is also available. It is the only version offered in many countries (UK, Benelux, Portugal, Germany, Austria, Nordic countries) where the ICE C4 X was not sold. However, due to customer demand the ICE C4 X was made available in the UK in June 2023.

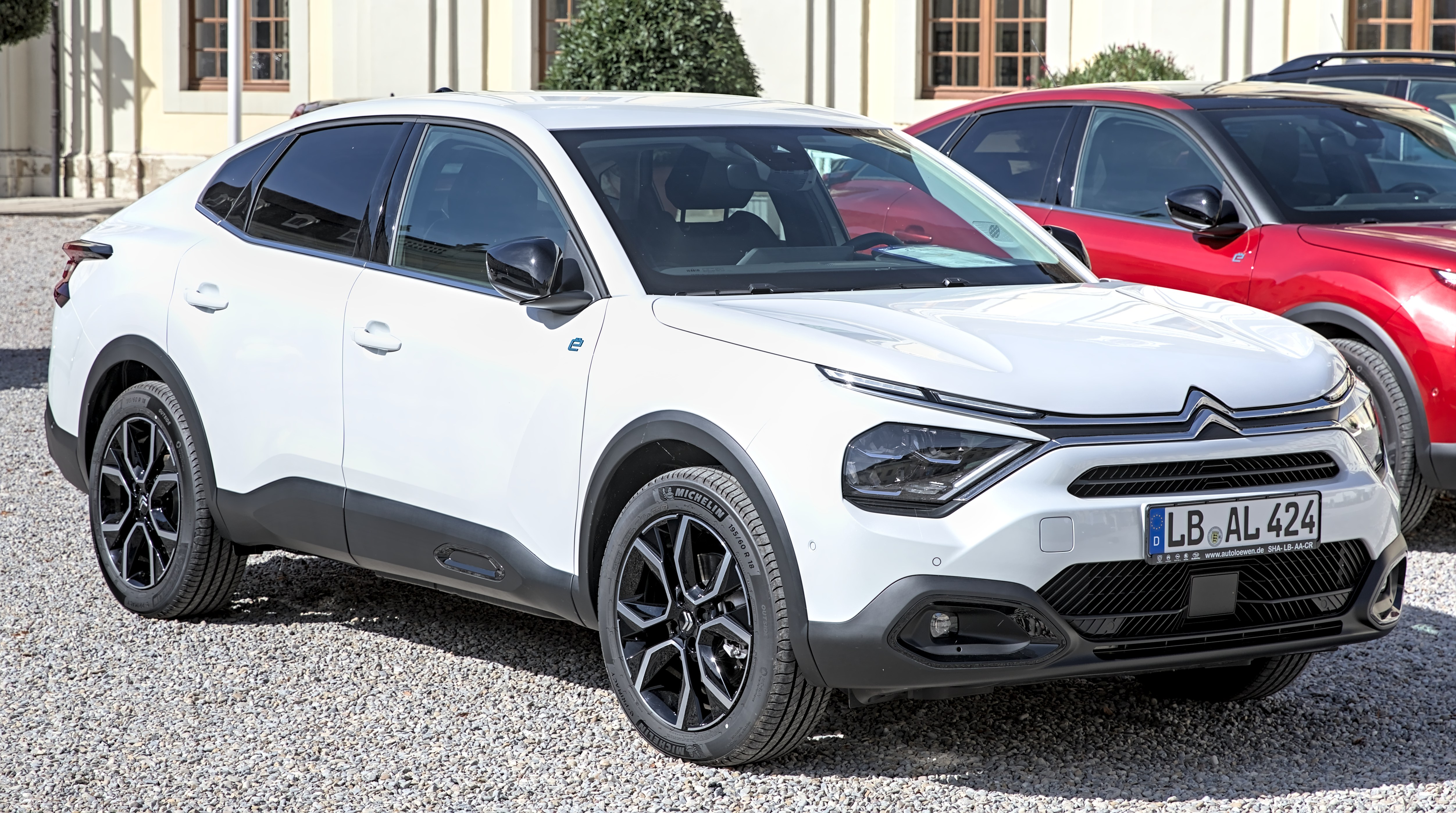
Citroën ë-C4 X (pre-facelift)

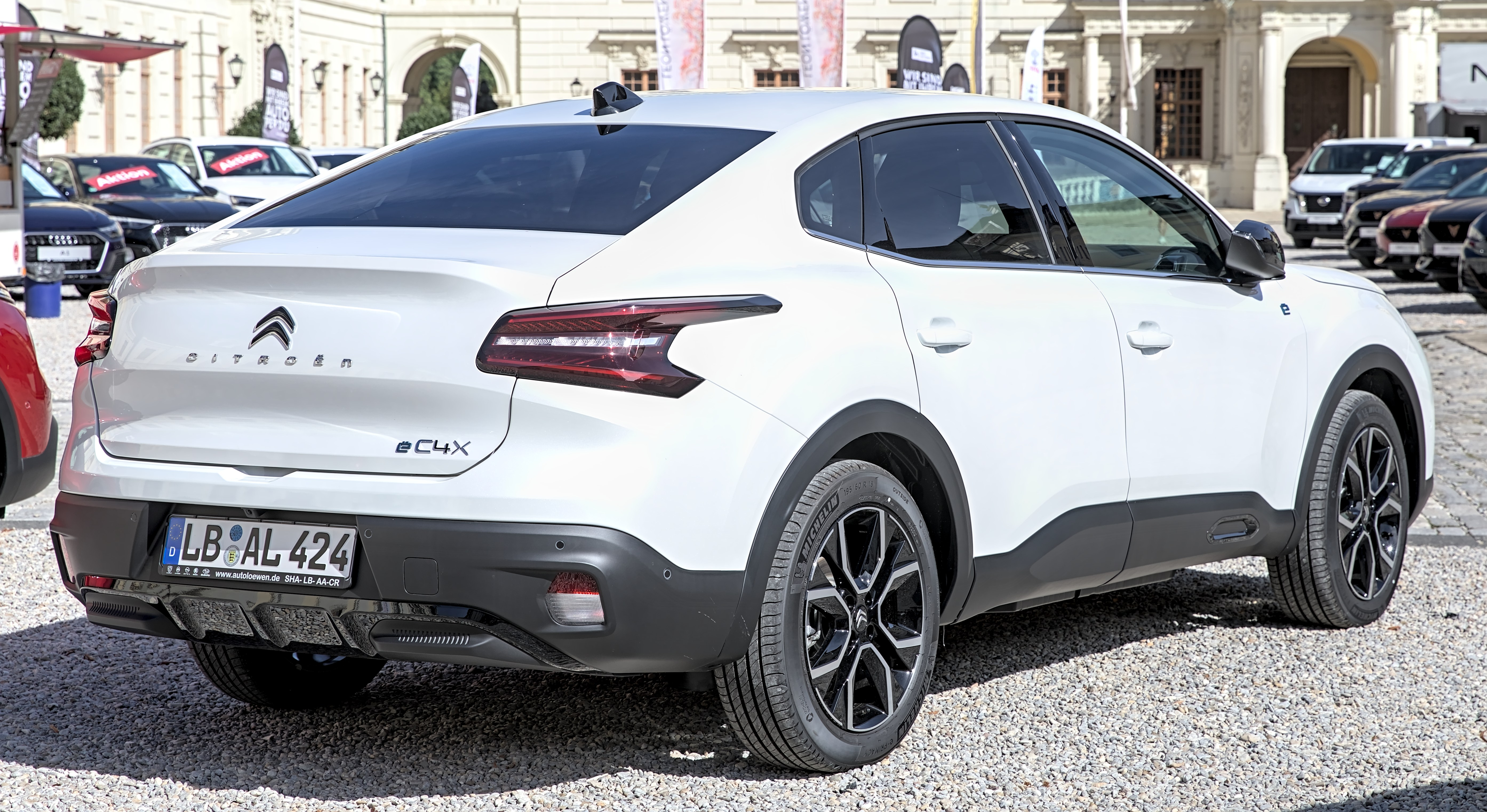
Rear view (pre-facelift)

=== 2025 facelift ===
At the 2024 Paris Motor Show, Citroën unveiled the facelifted models of both the C4 and C4 X which are inspired from the Oli concept car previewed in 2022. Both models have a redesigned front fascia with the inclusion of latest brand logo and the C4 received a redesigned rear fascia with new LED taillights. Inside, there are new Advanced Comfort seats with thicker foam padding, a new 7-inch digital instrument cluster and the touchscreen infotainment system receives updated software. Other changes include new mild hybrid engines and the manual transmission option has been discontinued.

On 16 April 2025, Kasrawy Group, in cooperation with Stellantis, has begun assembling the new Citroën C4X facelift in Egypt at the Arab American Vehicles Company (AAV) plant.

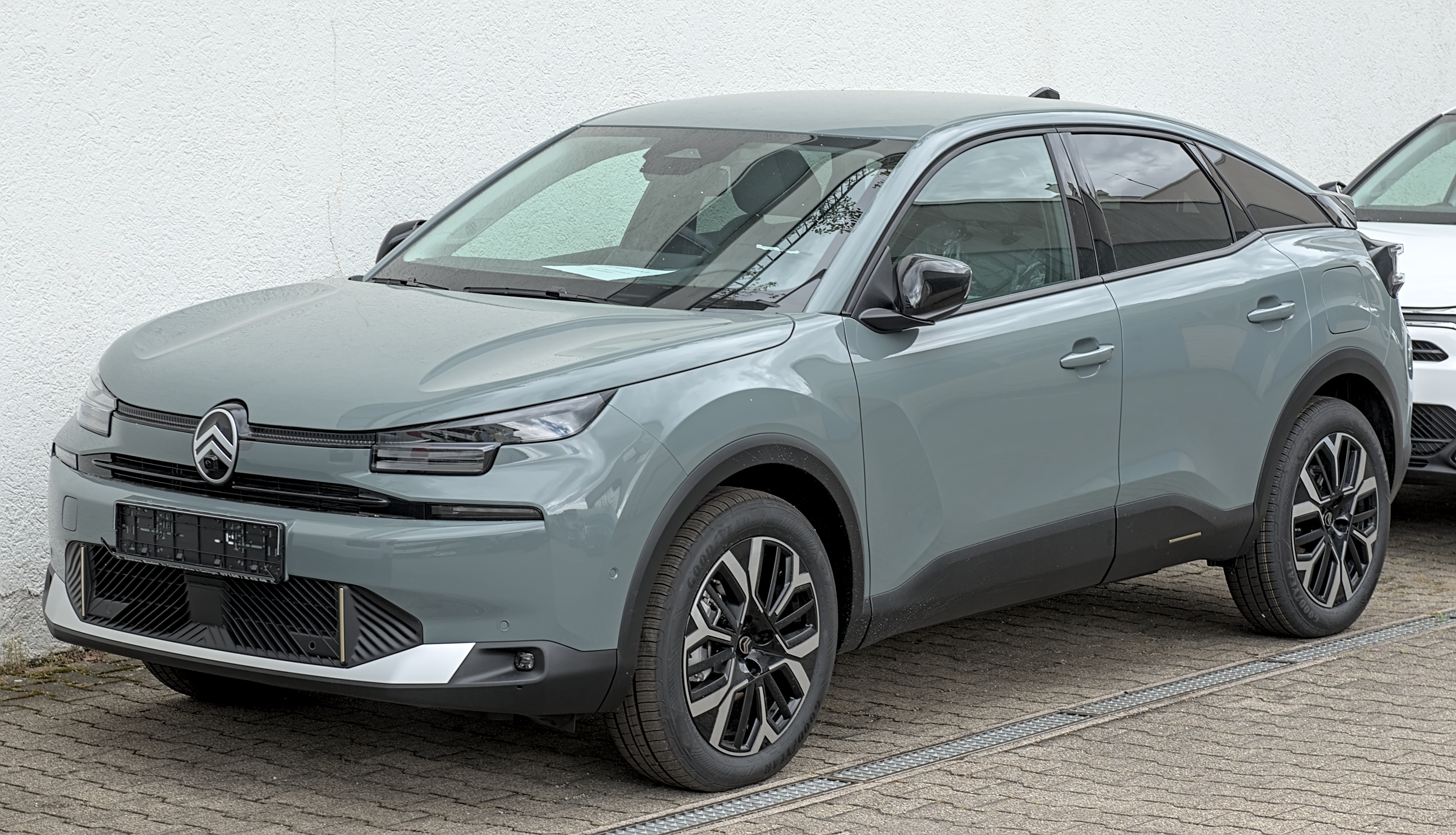
2025 Citroën C4 (facelift)

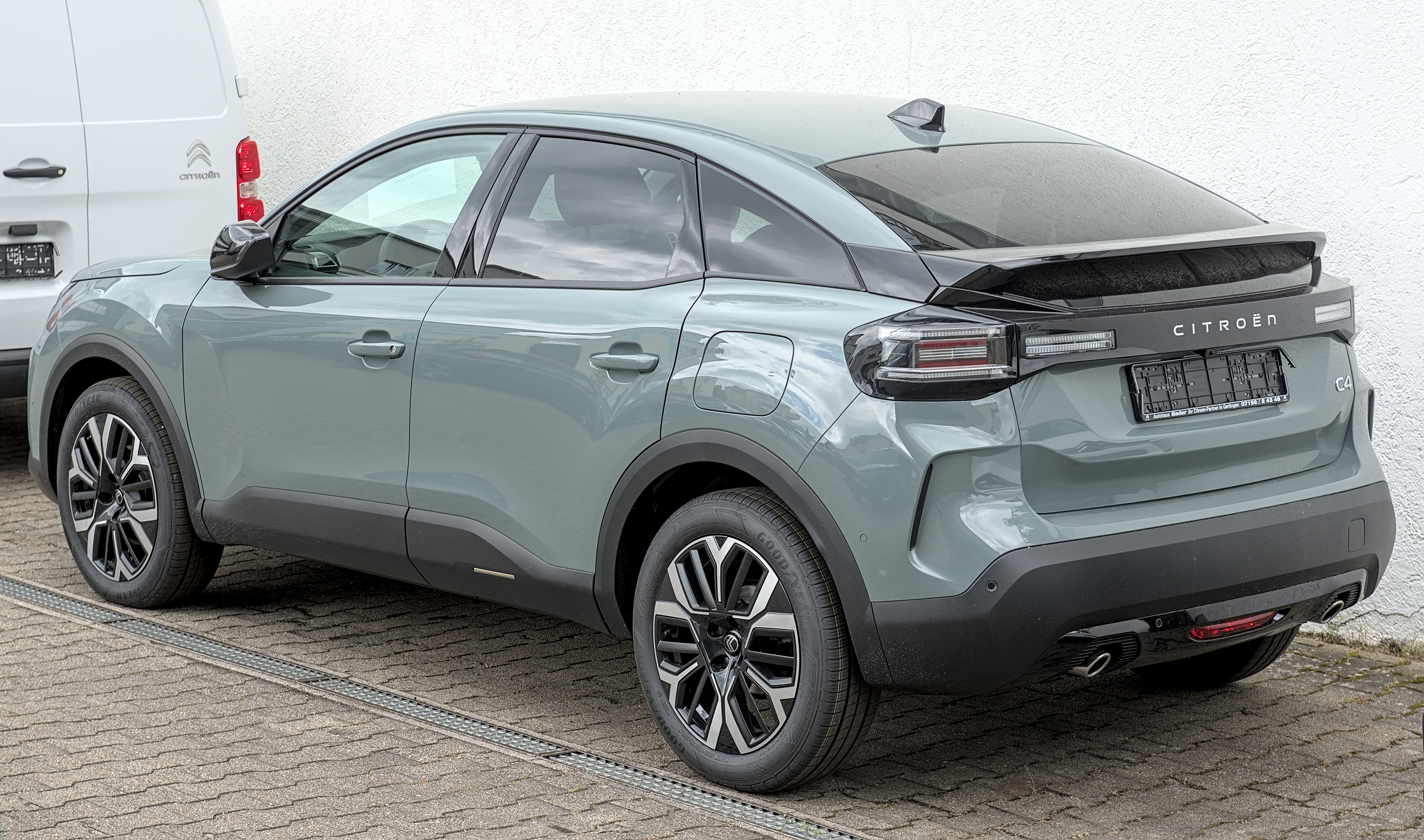
Rear view (facelift)

2025 Citroën C4 X (facelift)

Rear view (facelift)

=== Powertrains ===
Petrol engines
Model	Year	Engine	Displacement	Power	Torque	0–100 km/h (0–62 mph)	Top speed	Transmission	CO_{2} emission (g/km)
1.2 Puretech	2020–2025	I3	1199 cc	74 kW (100 PS; 99 hp) at 5,500 rpm	205 N⋅m (151 lb⋅ft) at 1,750 rpm	10.8 (C4); 11.6 (C4X)	114 mph (183 km/h)	6-speed manual	122-136 (C4); 123-136 (C4X)
1.2 Puretech	2020–present	I3	1199 cc	96 kW (130 PS; 128 hp) at 5,550 rpm	230 N⋅m (170 lb⋅ft) at 1,750 rpm	8.9 (C4 Manual); 9.4 (C4 EAT8); 10.3 (C4X)	124 mph (200 km/h)	6-speed manual (C4) (2020–2025); 8-speed automatic	119-135 (C4 Manual); 131-142 (C4 EAT8, C4X)
1.2 Puretech Turbo	2020–2022	I3	1199 cc	114 kW (155 PS; 153 hp) at 5500 rpm	250 N⋅m (184 lb⋅ft) at 1750 rpm	8.5	129 mph (208 km/h)	8-speed automatic (C4)	135
1.2 Puretech Turbo	2024–present	I3	1199 cc	74 kW (100 PS; 99 hp) at 5500 rpm	205 N⋅m (151 lb⋅ft) at 1750 rpm	10.7	119 mph (192 km/h)	6-speed dual clutch automatic (C4)	107–125
1.2 Puretech Turbo	2024–present	I3	1199 cc	100 kW (136 PS; 134 hp) at 5500 rpm	230 N⋅m (170 lb⋅ft) at 1750 rpm	8.0 (C4); 8.1 (C4X)	128 mph (206 km/h)	6-speed dual clutch automatic	106-125 (C4); 107-125 (C4X)
Diesel engines
1.5 BlueHDi Turbo	2020-2024	I4	1499 cc	96 kW (130 PS; 128 hp) at 3750 rpm	300 N⋅m (221 lb⋅ft) at 1750 rpm	10.6	128 mph (206 km/h)	8-speed automatic	120-123

=== Safety ===
ANCAP test results Citroen C4 all variants (2021, aligned with Euro NCAP)
Test	Points	%
Overall:	5 /5 stars	
Adult occupant:	29.26	76%
Child occupant:	39.88	81%
Pedestrian:	30.89	57%
Safety assist:	9.96	62%

Euro NCAP test results Citroën C4 1.2 petrol 'Feel Pack' (LHD) (2021)
Test	Points	%
Overall:	4 /5 stars	
Adult occupant:	30.5	80%
Child occupant:	40.9	83%
Pedestrian:	30.9	57%
Safety assist:	10.2	63%

== Other versions ==
=== C4 Aircross (2012–2017) ===
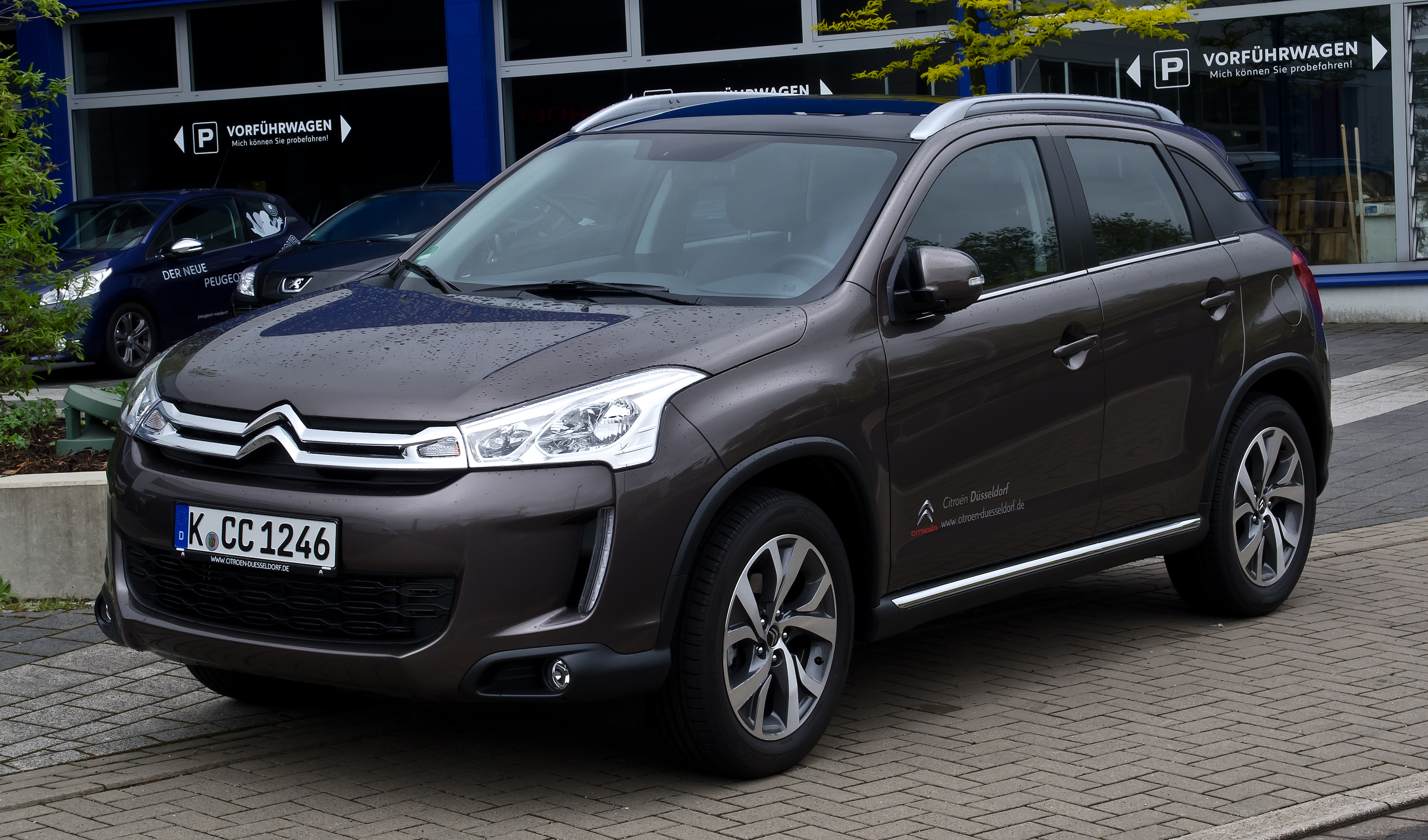
Citroën C4 Aircross

The Citroën C4 Aircross is a compact SUV based on the Mitsubishi ASX and the Peugeot 4008. It was featured at the 2012 Geneva Motor Show. A four-wheel drive version of the Aircross is also available.

=== C4 Cactus (2014–2024) ===
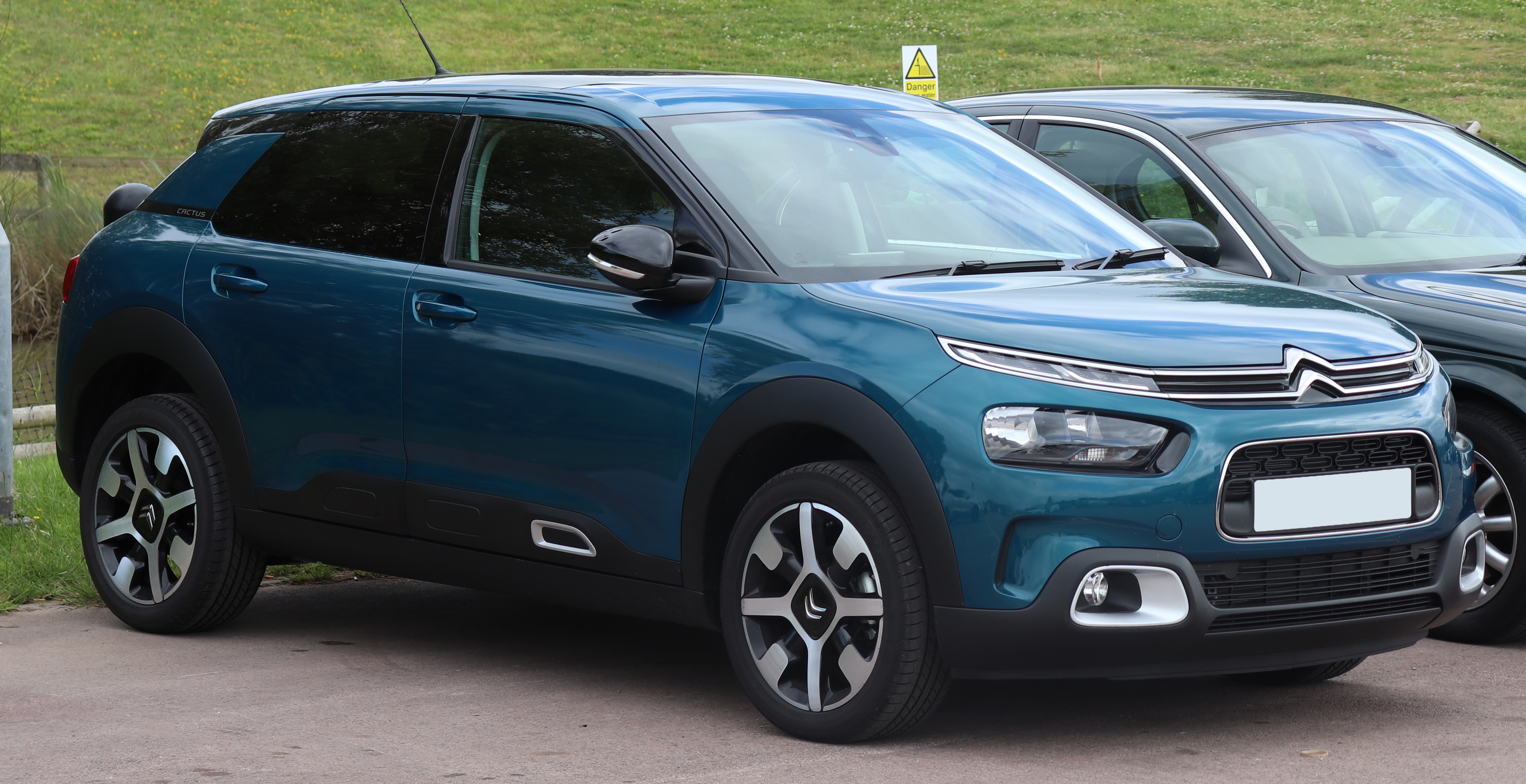
Citroën C4 Cactus

The C4 Cactus is a subcompact crossover produced in PSA's Villaverde factory in Madrid, Spain since the first quarter of 2014. Sales commenced in France in June 2014. Although branded as the C4 Cactus, it is based on the smaller PF1 platform that underpins the C3 and the DS 3. In Europe, it was succeeded by the third generation C4, dropping the "Cactus" suffix.

== Sales and production ==
Year	Worldwide Production	Worldwide sales	Notes
2009	TBA	216,900	
2010	TBA	235,000	
2011	401,402	286,171	Total production reaches 2,512,111 units.
2012	261,700	263,800	Total production reaches 2,855,000 units.
2013	278,600	283,300	

== C4 in rallying ==
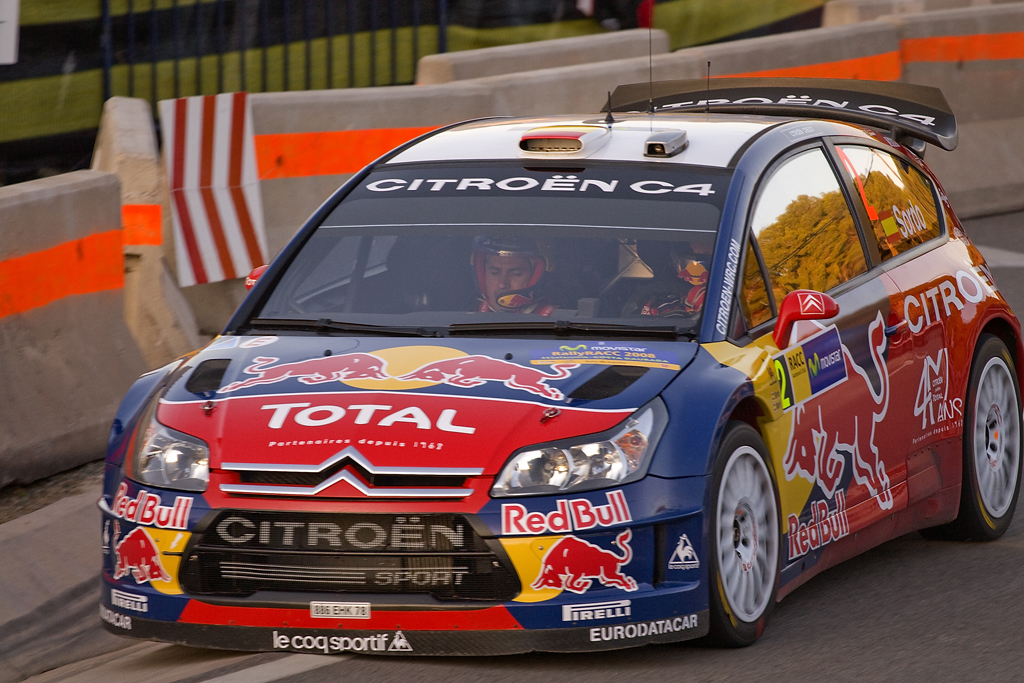
Dani Sordo driving a C4 WRC at the 2008 Rally Catalunya.

A much-anticipated C4 World Rally Car, intended to replace the multiple World Rally Championship-winning Citroën Xsara WRC, was first sighted in 2004 with testing duties assigned to double world rally champion Carlos Sainz. Having once been earmarked for a late 2005 competitive debut, the decision by the controlling PSA Group to withdraw both Citroën and stablemates Peugeot from works participation at the end of the 2005 season led to the momentary abandonment of the project.

Since then, however, the marque etched in a comeback for the 2007 season, during which a revived C4 WRC was scheduled for its official debut, with the then-thrice world champion Sébastien Loeb as the official first driver, and Dani Sordo, the 2005 Junior World Rally Champion, later confirmed alongside him after an impressive 2006 season for the Spaniard. In their official debut at the 2007 Monte Carlo Rally, the two C4 WRCs finished 1–2, with Loeb winning ahead of Sordo. Loeb has subsequently secured the 2007, 2008, 2009, and 2010 drivers' titles, with Citroën claiming the 2008, 2009 and 2010 manufacturers' championships.

In the 2009 season, Citroën's satellite team, Citroën Junior Team, ran a C4 WRC for Evgeny Novikov, Conrad Rautenbach, and the 2008 junior world champion Sébastien Ogier. For the 2010 season, the team ran a C4 WRC for Ogier and the 2007 Formula One world champion Kimi Räikkönen. The 2003 world rally champion Petter Solberg competes in a C4 WRC for his private team. The C4 WRC was replaced by the DS3 WRC for the 2011 WRC season.

Citroën also unveiled a hybrid concept WRC car at the 2008 Paris Motor Show. The Citroën C4 WRC Hymotion4 uses a KERS system similar to that in the Peugeot 908 HY.

== Awards ==
The first generation C4 scored second place at the 2005 European Car of the Year awards. It won the 2006 World Car Design of the Year, as well as the Autosport Rally Car of the Year in 2010

The second generation C4 (from 2010 onwards) was awarded a Euro NCAP Advanced Award for its eTouch Emergency & Assistance System.

In 2023, the Citroën ë-C4 won the category of the 'Best Used Small Electric Car' at the Carbuyer Best Used Car Awards.
