= 1998 FIA Cross Country Rally World Cup =

1998 FIA Cross Country Rally World Cup
Previous:	1997	Next:	1999

The 1998 FIA Cross Country Rally World Cup season was the 6th season of the FIA Cross Country Rally World Cup. Jean-Louis Schlesser was the drivers' champion driving his own buggy. Mitsubishi won the Manufacturers' cup.

== Calendar ==
The calendar featured seven events.

Round	Dates	Rally name
1	1–18 January	(France) (Senegal) Paris-Granada-Dakar
2	5–8 March	(Italy) Italian Baja
3	2–11 April	(Tunisia) Rallye Optic 2000 de Tunisie
4	7–16 May	(Morocco) Rallye Atlas Savane
5	18–21 June	Baja Portugal Telecel 1000
6	18–20 July	(Spain) Baja Movistar España Aragón
7	3–6 November	(United Arab Emirates) Marlboro UAE Desert Challenge

== Results ==
Round	Rally name	Podium finishers			
Round	Rally name	Rank	Driver	Car	Time
1	(France) (Senegal) Paris-Granada-Dakar	1	(France) Jean-Pierre Fontenay (France) Gilles Picard	Mitsubishi Pajero	65h25m58s
1	(France) (Senegal) Paris-Granada-Dakar	2	(Japan) Kenjiro Shinozuka (Andorra) Henri Magne	Mitsubishi Pajero	
1	(France) (Senegal) Paris-Granada-Dakar	3	(France) Bruno Saby (France) Dominique Serieys	Mitsubishi Pajero	
2	(Italy) Italian Baja	1	(France) Jean-Louis Schlesser (France) Philippe Monnet	Schlesser Buggy	7h11m23s
2	(Italy) Italian Baja	2	(Japan) Kenjiro Shinozuka (Andorra) Henri Magne	Mitsubishi Pajero	7h13m34s
2	(Italy) Italian Baja	3	(United States) Curt LeDuc (Italy) Giorgio Albiero	ProTruck	7h14m44s
3	(Tunisia) Rallye Optic 2000 de Tunisie	1	(France) Jean-Louis Schlesser (France) Philippe Monnet	Schlesser Buggy	20h53m52s
3	(Tunisia) Rallye Optic 2000 de Tunisie	2	(Japan) Kenjiro Shinozuka (Andorra) Henri Magne	Mitsubishi Pajero	21h20m55s
3	(Tunisia) Rallye Optic 2000 de Tunisie	3	(France) Philippe Alliot (France) Jacky Dubois	Nissan Patrol GR	23h40m24s
4	(Morocco) Rallye Atlas Savane	1	(France) Jean-Louis Schlesser (France) Philippe Monnet	Schlesser Buggy	17h57m43s
4	(Morocco) Rallye Atlas Savane	2	(Japan) Kenjiro Shinozuka (Andorra) Henri Magne	Mitsubishi Pajero	17h59m48s
4	(Morocco) Rallye Atlas Savane	3	(France) Pierre Lartigue (France) Alain Guehennec	Ipso Buggy	18h49m20s
5	Baja Portugal Telecel 1000	1	(France) Philippe Wambergue (France) Jean-Paul Cottret	Toyota Land Cruiser	9h47m59s
5	Baja Portugal Telecel 1000	2	(Portugal) Santos Godinho (Portugal) Victor Jesus	SG Proto	9h58m17s
5	Baja Portugal Telecel 1000	3	(France) Jean-Louis Schlesser (France) Philippe Monnet	Schlesser Buggy	10h07m16s
6	(Spain) Baja Movistar España Aragón	1	(France) Jean-Louis Schlesser (France) Jean-Dominique Comolli	Schlesser Buggy	8h54m59s
6	(Spain) Baja Movistar España Aragón	2	(Italy) Francesco Germanetti (Russia) Oleg Pyalin	Nissan Patrol	9h07m18s
6	(Spain) Baja Movistar España Aragón	3	(Spain) Miguel Prieto (Spain) Carlos Mas	Mitsubishi Pajero	9h08m19s
7	(United Arab Emirates) Marlboro UAE Desert Challenge	1	(France) Jean-Pierre Fontenay (France) Gilles Picard	Mitsubishi Pajero	13h46m31s
7	(United Arab Emirates) Marlboro UAE Desert Challenge	2	(France) Jean-Louis Schlesser (United Kingdom) Matthew Stevenson	Schlesser Buggy	14h23m23s
7	(United Arab Emirates) Marlboro UAE Desert Challenge	3	(Japan) Kenjiro Shinozuka (Andorra) Henri Magne	Mitsubishi Pajero	14h36m22s

== Drivers' Championship ==
The best 6 results, including not more than the best 2 results in Bajas, are taken into account for the final classification of the Cup.

Pos	Driver	PDA (Senegal)	ITA (Italy)	TUN (Tunisia)	ATL (Morocco)	POR (Portugal)	ARA (Spain)	ABU (United Arab Emirates)	Points
1	(France) Jean-Louis Schlesser	5^{68}	1^{58}	1^{87}	1^{87}	(3^{42})	1^{58}	2^{72}	430
2	(Japan) Kenjiro Shinozuka	2^{84}	2^{48}	2^{72}	2^{72}	Ret^{0}	-	3^{63}	339
3	(France) Jean-Pierre Fontenay	1^{116}	-	Ret^{0}	Ret^{0}	-	-	1^{87}	203
4	(France) Philippe Alliot	6^{60}	-	3^{63}	5^{36}	-	-	6^{30}	189
5	(France) Bruno Saby	3^{64}	-	-	4^{48}	-	-	-	112
6	(France) Jean-Pierre Strugo	13^{12}	-	6^{45}	-	-	4^{38}	10^{15}	110

== Manufacturers' Championship ==
In order to be featured in the final classification of the Cup, a manufacturer must enter at least 5 events. Only Group T1 and T2 cars are eligible.

The best 6 results, including not more than the best 2 results in Bajas, are taken into account for the final classification of the Cup.

Pos	Driver	PDA (Senegal)	ITA (Italy)	TUN (Tunisia)	ATL (Morocco)	POR (Portugal)	ARA (Spain)	ABU (United Arab Emirates)	Points
1	(Japan) Mitsubishi	80	40	60	60	(34)	40	60	340
2	(Japan) Nissan	12	34	42	42	20	(8)	48	198
3	(Japan) Toyota	20	-	45	36	40	18	9	168
4	(United Kingdom) Land Rover	0	-	9	0	0	20	-	29
