= 1999 FIA Cross Country Rally World Cup =

1999 FIA Cross Country Rally World Cup
Previous:	1998	Next:	2000

The 1999 FIA Cross Country Rally World Cup season was the 7th season of the FIA Cross Country Rally World Cup. Jean-Louis Schlesser was the drivers' champion driving his own buggy. Mitsubishi won the Manufacturers' cup.

== Calendar ==
The calendar featured eight events.

Round	Dates	Event name
1	31 December–17 January	(Spain) (Senegal) Granada-Dakar
2	19–21 March	(Italy) Italian Baja
3	10–18 April	(Tunisia) Optic 2000 Rallye de Tunisie
4	17–20 June	Baja Portugal Telecel 1000
5	8–11 July	(Spain) Baja Movistar España Aragón
6	24 July–8 August	(Russia) (Turkey) Master Rallye
7	21–25 September	(Argentina) Por Las Pampas Rally
8	2-6 November	(United Arab Emirates) UAE Desert Challenge

== Results ==
Round	Rally name	Podium finishers			
Round	Rally name	Rank	Driver	Car	Time
1	(Spain) (Senegal) Granada-Dakar	1	(France) Jean-Louis Schlesser (France) Philippe Monnet	Schlesser Buggy	70h26m35s
1	(Spain) (Senegal) Granada-Dakar	2	(Spain) Miguel Prieto (France) Dominique Serieys	Mitsubishi Pajero	
1	(Spain) (Senegal) Granada-Dakar	3	(Germany) Jutta Kleinschmidt (Sweden) Tina Thörner	Mitsubishi Pajero	
2	(Italy) Italian Baja	1	(Japan) Kenjiro Shinozuka (France) Gilles Picard	Mitsubishi Pajero	7h43m55s
2	(Italy) Italian Baja	2	(France) Jean-Louis Schlesser (France) Thierry Delli Zotti	Schlesser Buggy	
2	(Italy) Italian Baja	3	(Spain) José Maria Servia (France) Philippe Monnet	Schlesser Buggy	
3	(Tunisia) Optic 2000 Rallye de Tunisie	1	(France) Jean-Louis Schlesser (France) Philippe Monnet	Schlesser Buggy	20h08m20s
3	(Tunisia) Optic 2000 Rallye de Tunisie	2	(Japan) Kenjiro Shinozuka (France) Dominique Serieys	Mitsubishi Pajero	
3	(Tunisia) Optic 2000 Rallye de Tunisie	3	(Spain) José Maria Servia (France) Thierry Delli Zotti	Schlesser Buggy	
4	Baja Portugal Telecel 1000	1	(Portugal) Carlos Sousa (Portugal) Mário Feio	Mitsubishi Strada	9h08m33s
4	Baja Portugal Telecel 1000	2	(France) Jean-Louis Schlesser (France) Philippe Monnet	Schlesser Buggy	
4	Baja Portugal Telecel 1000	3	(Portugal) Felipe Campos (Portugal) Pedro Figueiredo	Toyota Land Cruiser	
5	(Spain) Baja Movistar España Aragón	1	(Spain) José Maria Servia (France) Thierry Delli Zotti	Schlesser Buggy	10h37m57s
5	(Spain) Baja Movistar España Aragón	2	(Spain) Miguel Prieto (Spain) Carlos Mas	Mitsubishi Pajero	
5	(Spain) Baja Movistar España Aragón	3	(Spain) Manuel Plaza (Spain) Ignacio Salvador	Mitsubishi Challenger	
6	(Russia) (Turkey) Master Rallye	1	(France) Jean-Louis Schlesser (France) Philippe Monnet	Schlesser Buggy	38h25m10s
6	(Russia) (Turkey) Master Rallye	2	(Spain) José Maria Servia (France) Thierry Delli Zotti	Schlesser Buggy	
6	(Russia) (Turkey) Master Rallye	3	(France) Thierry De Lavergne (France) Jacky Dubois	Nissan Patrol GR	
7	(Argentina) Por Las Pampas Rally	1	(France) Jean-Louis Schlesser (Andorra) Henri Magne	Schlesser Buggy	22h19m06s
7	(Argentina) Por Las Pampas Rally	2	(Japan) Kenjiro Shinozuka (France) Dominique Serieys	Mitsubishi Pajero	22h38m35s
7	(Argentina) Por Las Pampas Rally	3	(Argentina) Jorge Recalde (Italy) Franco Picco	Mitsubishi Pajero	25h09m05s
8	(United Arab Emirates) UAE Desert Challenge	1	(France) Jean-Louis Schlesser (Andorra) Henri Magne	Schlesser Buggy	15h00m19s
8	(United Arab Emirates) UAE Desert Challenge	2	(Japan) Kenjiro Shinozuka (France) Dominique Serieys	Mitsubishi Pajero	
8	(United Arab Emirates) UAE Desert Challenge	3	(Germany) Jutta Kleinschmidt (Sweden) Tina Thörner	Mitsubishi Pajero	

== Drivers' Championship ==
The best 6 results, including not more than the best 2 results in Bajas, are taken into account for the final classification of the Cup.

Pos	Driver	DAK (Senegal)	ITA (Italy)	TUN (Tunisia)	POR (Portugal)	ARA (Spain)	MAS (Russia)	PAM (Argentina)	ABU (United Arab Emirates)	Points
1	(France) Jean-Louis Schlesser	1^{116}	(2^{48})	1^{87}	2^{48}	-	1^{116}	1^{87}	1^{87}	541
2	(Japan) Kenjiro Shinozuka	4^{64}	1^{58}	2^{72}	Ret^{0}	-	-	2^{72}	2^{72}	338
3	(Spain) José Maria Servia	5^{56}	3^{36}	3^{54}	(4^{32})	1^{58}	2^{84}	-	-	288
4	(Germany) Jutta Kleinschmidt	3^{84}	4^{32}	4^{48}	-	-	-	-	3^{54}	218

== Manufacturers' Championship ==
In order to be featured in the final classification of the Cup, a manufacturer must enter at least 5 events. Only Group T1 and T2 cars are eligible.

The best 6 results, including not more than the best 2 results in Bajas, are taken into account for the final classification of the Cup.

Pos	Driver	DAK (Senegal)	ITA (Italy)	TUN (Tunisia)	POR (Portugal)	ARA (Spain)	MAS (Russia)	PAM (Argentina)	ABU (United Arab Emirates)	Points
1	(Japan) Mitsubishi	80	(40)	60	(30)	40	60	60	60	360
2	(Japan) Nissan	40	(28)	42	34	32	80	-	48	276
3	(Japan) Toyota	32	(14)	21	40	26	56	42	(9)	217
4	(South Korea) Kia	-	-	3	-	-	-	36	-	39
