= Citroën ZX =

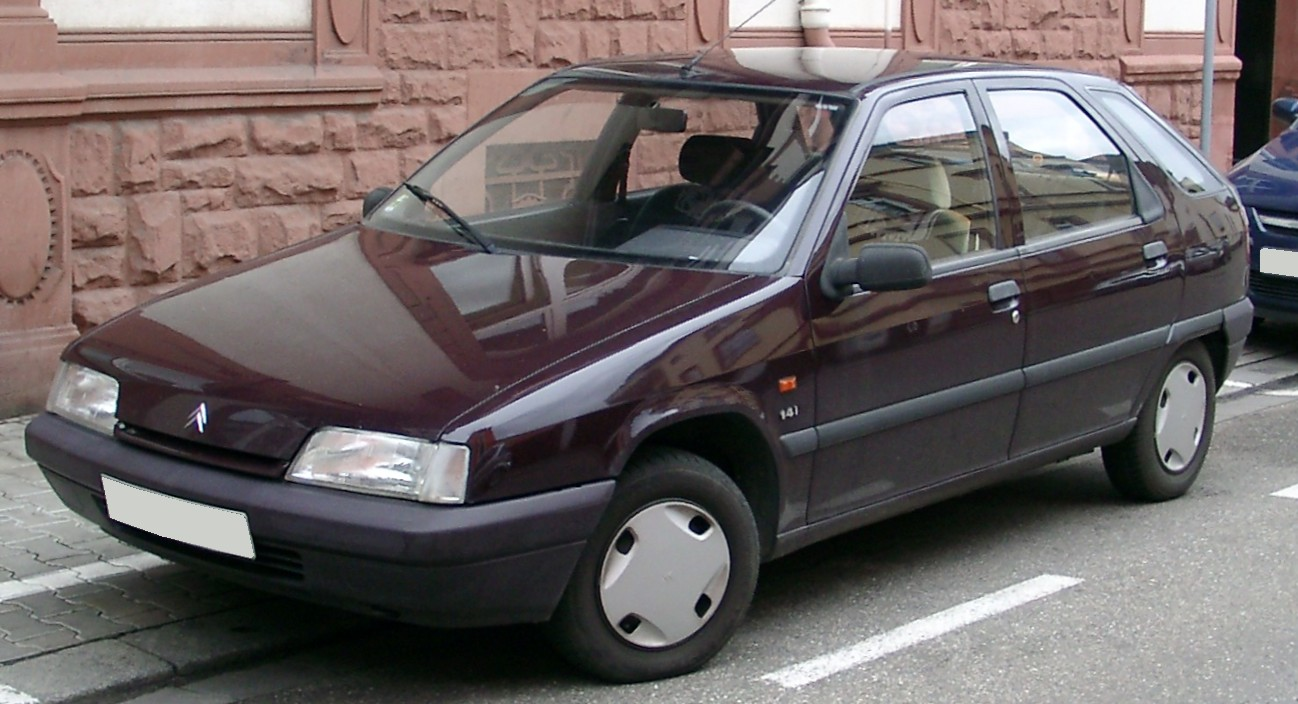

Overview
- Manufacturer: Citroën
- Also called: Citroën Fukang (China); Citroën Elysée (China); Citroën C-Elysée (China); Dongfeng N15 (van, China); Dongfeng EQ1010F (van, China)
- Production: 1991–1998 (Citroën ZX); 1992–2009 (Citroën Fukang); 2002–2008 (Citroën Elysée); 2008–2013 (Citroën C-Elysée)
- Assembly: France: Aulnay-sous-Bois (PSA Aulnay-sous-Bois Plant); France: Rennes (PSA Rennes Plant); France: Poissy (PSA Poissy Plant); China: Xiangyang; Wuhan (DPCA); Spain: Vigo (PSA Vigo Plant); Morocco: Casablanca (Sopriam); Uruguay: Barra de Carrasco (Oferol)
- Designer: Donato Coco in collaboration with Bertone

Body and chassis
- Class: Small family car (C)
- Body style: 3-door hatchback 5-door hatchback 5-door estate
- Layout: Front-engine, front-wheel-drive
- Related: Citroën Xsara; Citroën Elysée; Peugeot 306; Aeolus S30; Lifan 520

Powertrain
- Transmission: 5-speed manual 4-speed automatic

Dimensions
- Wheelbase: 2,540 mm (100.0 in)
- Length: 4,085–4,260 mm (160.8–167.7 in)

Chronology
- Predecessor: Citroën GS (1970–1986)
- Successor: Citroën Xsara

The Citroën ZX is a small family car produced by the French manufacturer Citroën between 1991 and 1998.

At the beginning of the 1990s, the ZX was Citroën's entry in the class traditionally dominated in Europe by the Ford Escort and Vauxhall/Opel Astra, a market segment Citroën had briefly abandoned with the demise of the GSA in 1986.

The BX had tried to address the small family car market and the large family car market by being "between sizes" but well packaged. For 1993, the Citroën ZX chassis was also used for the Peugeot 306 which, with its attractive Peugeot 205 derived styling, was an even more successful car than its twin. The Citroën Berlingo and Peugeot Partner were also built on the front half of the same platform, the rear coming from the 405, an arrangement shared underneath the Xsara Picasso.

It was replaced by the Xsara in September 1997, but production in Europe continued until 1998.

== History ==
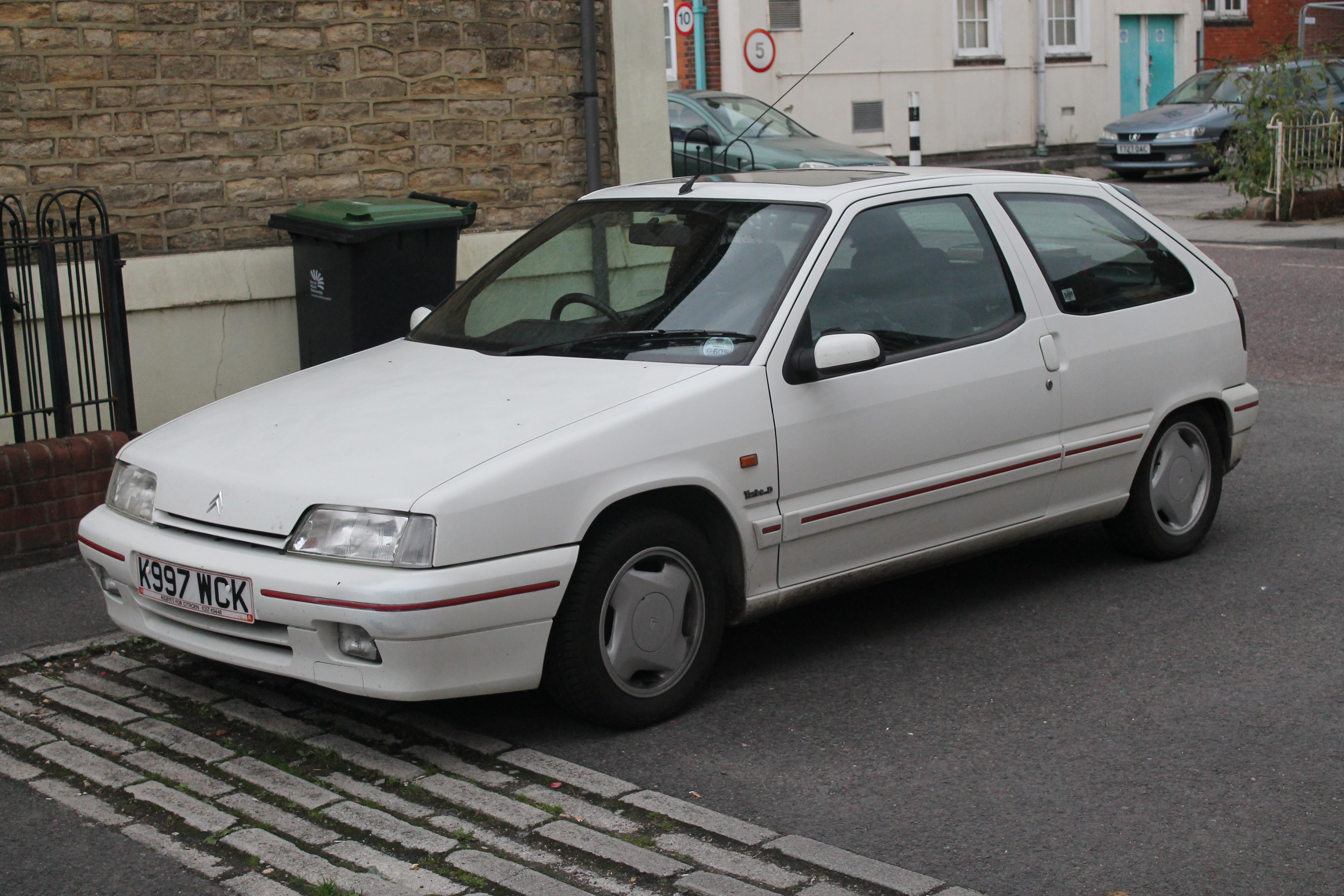
Citroën ZX Volcane (three door, pre-facelift)

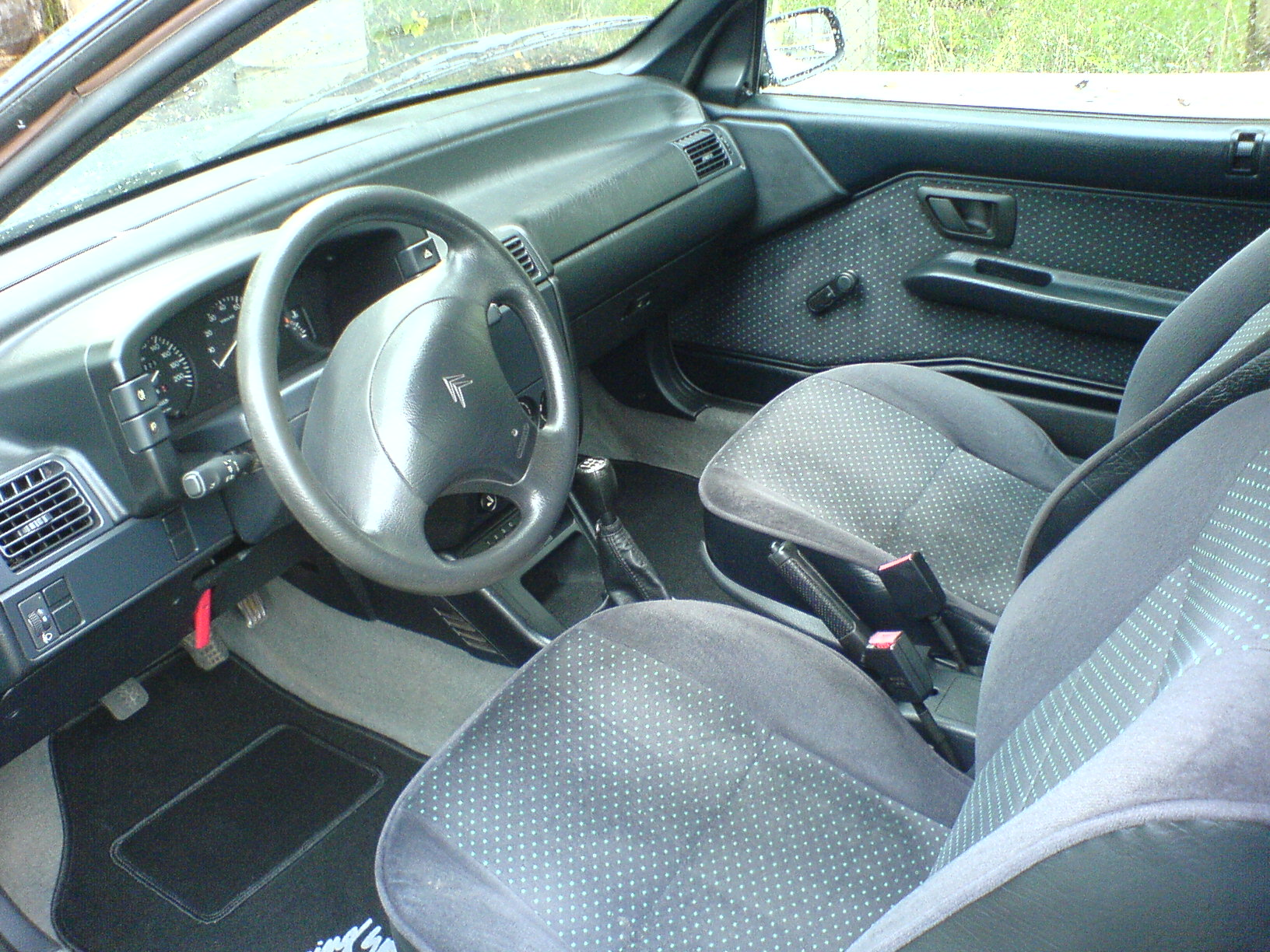
Interior

The Citroën GS had been a ground breaking and radical new model in the small family car market on its launch in 1970, scooping the European Car of the Year award, and was facelifted in 1979 and gained a hatchback which saw it transformed into the GSA.

However, such was the success of the larger BX after its 1982 launch, that PSA decided to delay the launch of an immediate replacement for the GSA when it was finally discontinued in 1986. Development work began on a new C segment hatchback, which was originally expected to be launched as the Citroën FX at the beginning of the 1990s.

Although the Rally Raid version of the ZX debuted during 1990, the ZX was officially launched on the left hand drive continental markets on 16 March 1991, with British sales beginning in May that year, initially only with petrol engines. The diesel ZX went on sale later in 1991. The ZX was helped at the time of introduction by having reached the market a few months before the new version of the Opel/Vauxhall Astra.

The sales target was about 230,000 vehicles per year, with half of that number going outside of France.

It went on sale in New Zealand in the beginning of 1993, as a five door in 1.6 Aura or Turbodiesel trim, with the naturally aspirated diesel and Volcane GTi (1.9) models joining a few weeks later. New Zealand's unleaded petrol was of a low octane rating, meaning that initially only uncatalyzed cars were on offer.

In January 1994, the estate of the ZX debuted, and went on sale in May, shortly thereafter followed by a mid-cycle facelift.

The first examples of the ZX had been produced in 1990, with the three door Rally Raid model being the winner of the Paris-Dakar, which started just after Christmas. The first prototypes of the ZX had actually debuted at the Baja Aragon on 20 July 1990. Drag resistance ranged from Cds 0.30 to 0.33.

The launch of the ZX marked the return of Citroën into the C sector of the car market; it had discontinued the GSA in 1986 with no immediate replacement, largely due to the success of the larger BX. However, Citroën had decided to phase out the BX between 1990 and 1993, by at first launching a smaller model, and then adding a larger model (the Xantia) to its range.

The ZX's interior space and value received praise from critics and consumers. Of particular note was the unusual rear seat arrangement: the rear bench was mounted on a sliding platform that allowed it to be moved rearwards to increase rear legroom, or forwards to increase cargo space or to allow the seat back to be tilted backwards. Unfortunately, only the seat backs folded forward on models so fitted; lower specification models had more ultimate cargo capacity as the rear seat cushion folded up, allowing the seat back to be laid down flat. The ZX's specifications were good for its class, with most models getting power steering, electric windows, electric sunroof, a driver's side (and sometimes passenger's side) airbag, and anti-lock braking system as either optional or standard equipment. It remained competitively priced though, unlike the Mark III Volkswagen Golf, which was priced at a premium when launched in August 1991.

The familiar range of PSA powertrains drove the front wheels of a seemingly conventionally designed chassis. At the front was a standard MacPherson strut layout with anti-roll bar, while the rear used the PSA Peugeot-Citroën fully independent trailing arm/torsion bar set up that was first introduced on the estate of the Peugeot 305.

However, PSA's chassis engineers employed some unusual features, including passive rear-wheel steering to induce compliance understeer by means of specially designed bushes in the rear suspension. At high mileages, this is prone to wear off the axle mounting bushes, which is easily fixed. The rear shock absorbers were developed and constructed in house.

It is also prone to wear in the rear axle trailing arm bearings, which then wear the trailing arm axle tubes, requiring an expensive rebuild or a replacement axle assembly. The diesel and larger capacity petrol engines are canted as far back as possible in the engine bay, in an effort to put as much weight as possible behind the front axle line, also reducing the centre of gravity, while improving weight distribution and minimising understeer.

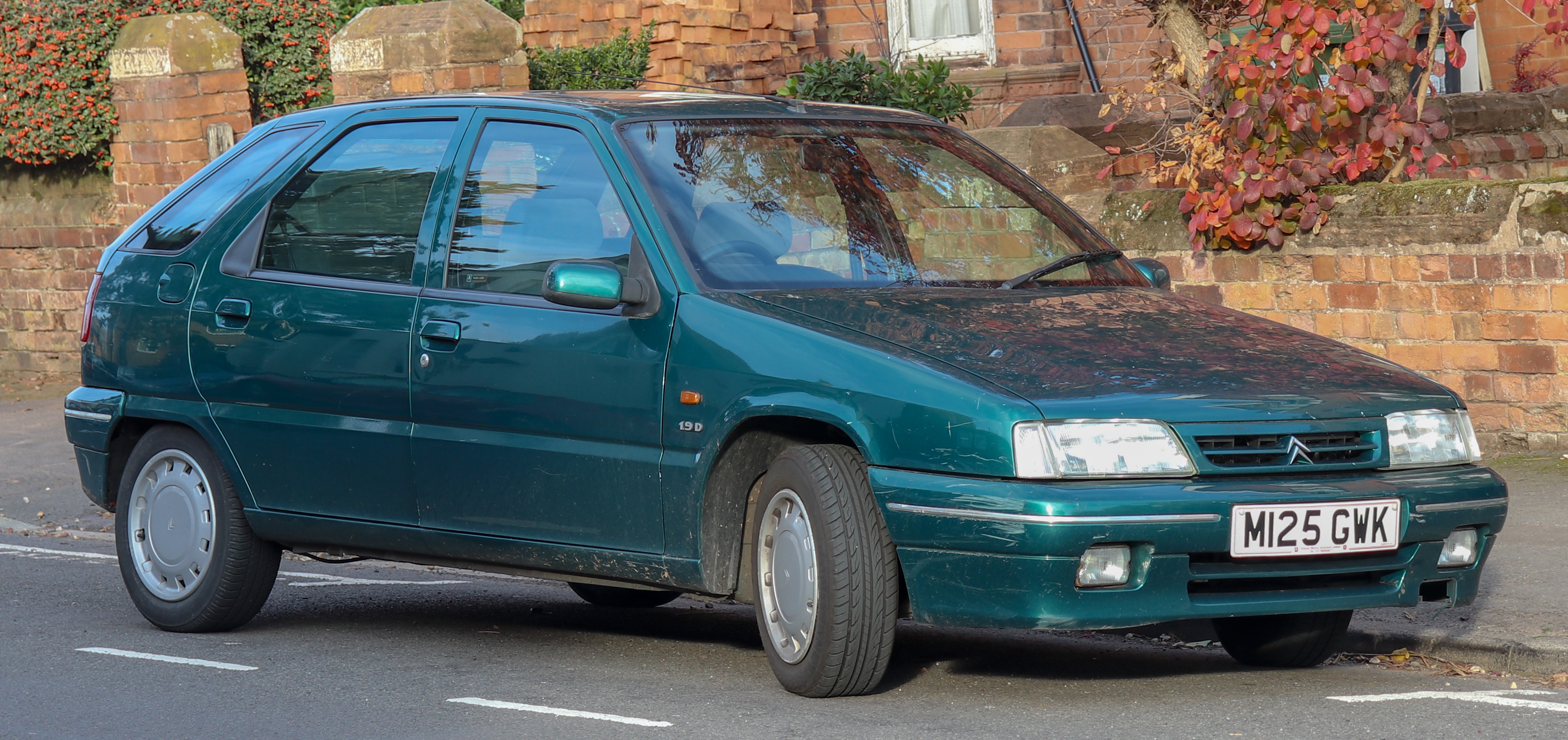
1994 Citroën ZX Dimension (facelift)

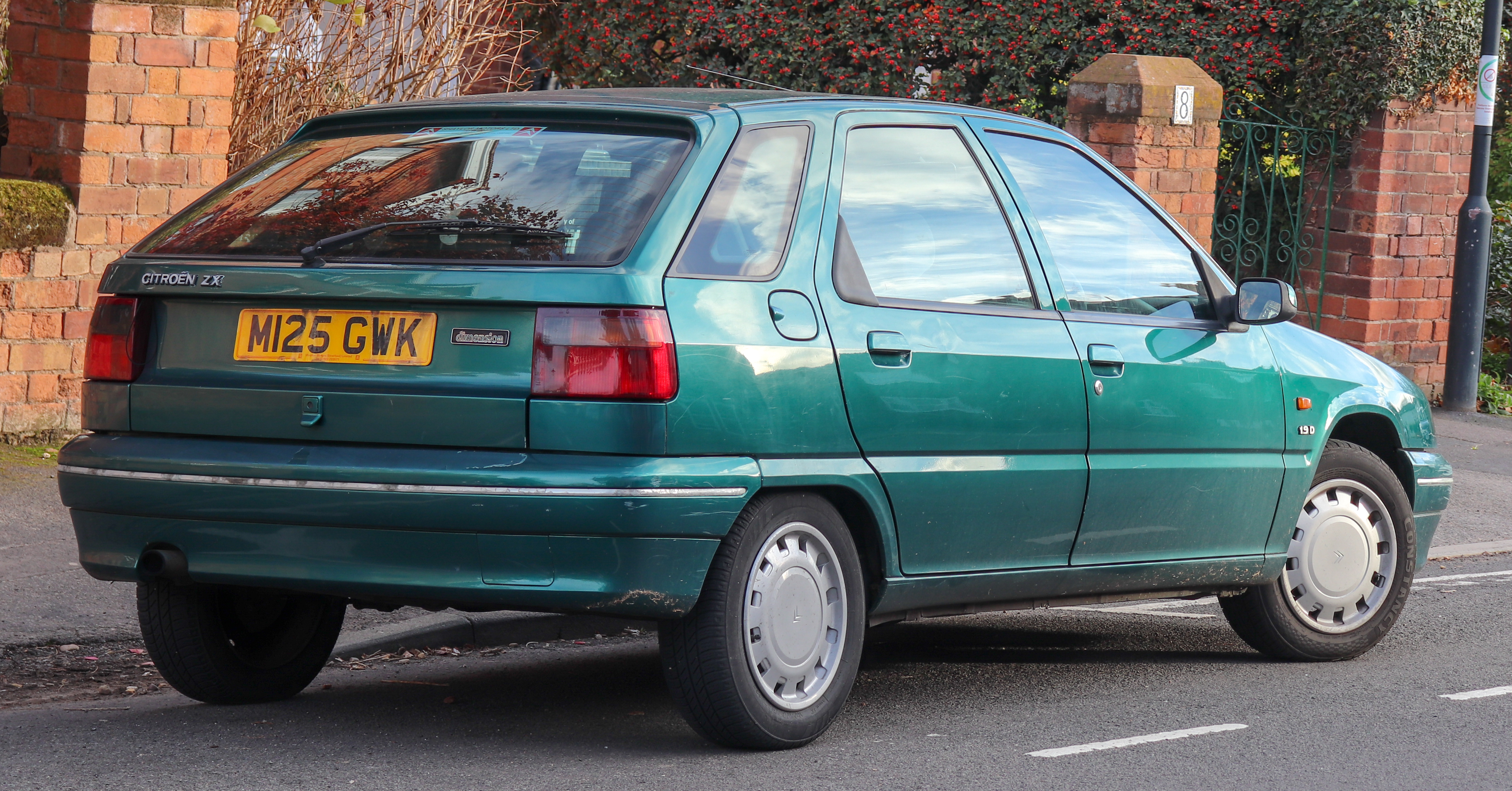
1994 Citroën ZX Dimension (facelift; rear view)

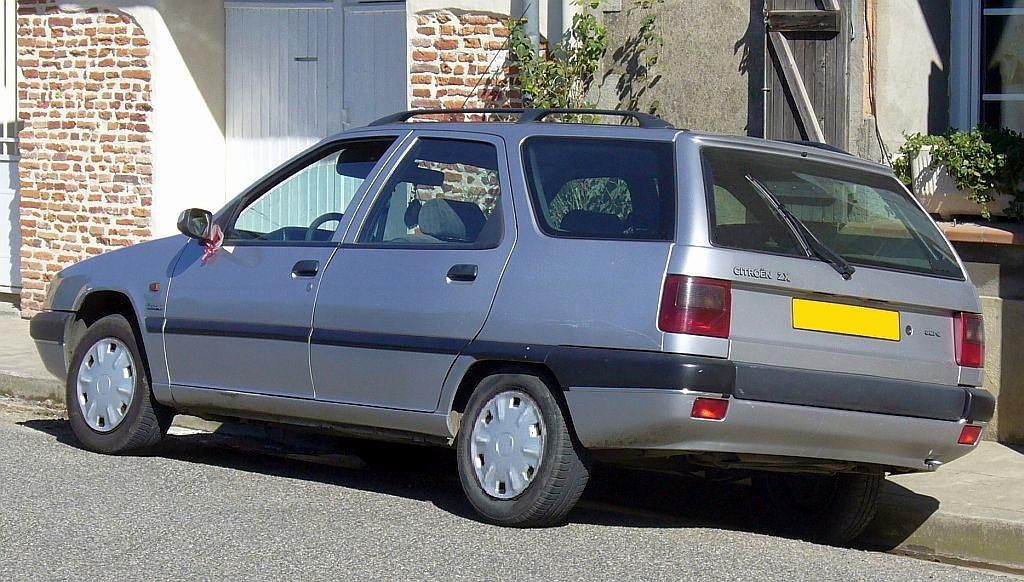
Citroën ZX Break (estate)

== Models ==
At the time of its launch, the ZX range consisted of a collection of four very individual trim levels; the base model was the "Reflex" aimed at young people, next was the "Avantage" aimed at families, and then there was the luxury "Aura" series. The final series was the relatively sporting "Volcane" series, with lowered (and hard) suspension. The later "Volcane" TD was one of the first diesel hot hatches.

Over time, further models were introduced, including the "Furio", a cheaper model with a sporting tone combined with the lesser engines, a 16-valve engined high performance derivative, and many special editions.

The ZX was initially available as a three- or five-door hatchback, while a five-door estate was added to the range in 1994. It was offered with petrol engines from 1.1 L to 2.0 L, as well as three 1.9 L diesel engines including a turbodiesel. However, the 1.1 petrol engine was never sold in Britain.

Model	Bodystyle	Engine	Displacement cc	Fuel feed	Max power			Max torque			Transmission	Weight		Top speed		Acceleration 0–100 km/h	Years built (EU)
Model	Bodystyle	Engine	Displacement cc	Fuel feed	PS	kW	at rpm	Nm	lb·ft	at rpm	Transmission	kg	lb	km/h	mph	Acceleration 0–100 km/h	Years built (EU)
Petrol-engined versions
ZX 1.1	hatchback	TU1 F2/K	1,124	Carburettor	60	44	5800	91	67	3200	5MT	931	2,053	155	96	-	1991-92
ZX 1.1i	hatchback	TU1M/Z	1,124	EFI	60	44	6200	87.5	65	3800	5MT	940	2,072	161	100	-	1993-97
ZX 1.4	hatchback	TU3 F2/K	1360	Carburettor	75	55	5800	116	86	3800	5MT	945	2,083	172	107	11.9	1991-92
ZX 1.4i	hatchback	TU3JP	1360	EFI	75	55	5500	111	82	3400	5MT	945	2,083	172	107	13.7	1992-97
ZX 1.4i	Break	TU3JP	1360	EFI	75	55	5500	111	82	3400	5MT	1,015	2,238	165	103	13.7	1994-97
ZX 1.6i	hatchback	XU5 M3/Z	1580	EFI	88	65	6400	132	97	3000	5MT	995	2,194	181	112	11.5	1991-92
ZX 1.6i Cat	hatchback	XU5 M3/Z	1580	EFI	88	65	6000	128	94	3000	5MT	995	2,194	177	110	13.1	1992-97
ZX 1.6i Cat	Break	XU5 M3/Z	1580	EFI	88	65	6000	128	94	3000	5MT	1,070	2,359	172	107	12.0	1995-98
ZX 1.8i	hatchback	XU7JP	1761	EFI	101	74	6000	153	113	3000	5MT	1,008	2,222	188	117	11.3	1992-96
ZX 1.8i	Break	XU7JP	1761	EFI	101	74	6000	153	113	3000	5MT	1,090	2,403	180	112	11.1	1994-96
ZX 1.8i Automatique	hatchback	XU7JP	1761	EFI	101	74	6000	153	113	3000	4AT	1,048	2,310	176	109	13.6	1993-97
ZX 1.8 16v	hatchback	XU7JP4	1761	EFI	110	81	5500	155	114	4250	5MT	1,050	2,315	195	121	11.3	1996-97
ZX 1.8 16v	Break	XU7JP4	1761	EFI	110	81	5500	155	114	4250	5MT	1,093	2,410	193	120	9.6	1996-98
ZX 1.9i	hatchback	XU9JA	1905	EFI	130	96	6000	161	119	4750	5MT	1,055	2,326	205	127	9.4	1991-92
ZX 1.9i Cat	hatchback	XU9JA/Z	1905	EFI	122	90	6000	142	105	3800	5MT	1,055	2,326	201	125	9.7	1992-94
ZX 1.9i Cat; Automatique	hatchback	XU9JA/Z	1905	EFI	120	88	6000	150	111	3000	4AT	1,055	2,326	200	124	12.3	1993
ZX 2.0i	hatchback	XU10J2C	1998	EFI	121	89	5750	176	130	2750	5MT	1,104	2,434	202	126	10.2	1992-94
ZX 2.0 16v	hatchback	XU10 J4D/Z	1998	EFI	152	112	6500	182.5	135	3500	5MT	1,150	2,535	220	137	9.4	1992-96
ZX 2.0 16v	hatchback	XU10 J4RS	1998	EFI	167	123	6500	193	142	5500	5MT	1,170	2,579	219	136	8.5	1996-97
Diesel-engined versions
ZX 1.9 D	hatchback	XUD9/Z	1,905	Indirect injection diesel	64	47	4600	118	87	2000	5MT	1,035	2,282	161	100	18.5	1993-95
ZX 1.9 D	hatchback	XUD9/Z	1,905	Indirect injection diesel	68	50	4600	120	89	2000	5MT	1,035	2,282	167	104	16.1	1995-97
ZX 1.9 D	Break	XUD9/Z	1,905	Indirect injection diesel	64	47	4600	118	87	2000	5MT	1,090	2,403	158	98	18.8	1994-95
ZX 1.9 D	Break	XUD9/Z	1,905	Indirect injection diesel	68	50	4600	120	89	2000	5MT	1,090	2,403	160	99	16.6	1995-98
ZX 1.9 TD	hatchback	XUD9 TE/L	1,905	Indirect injection Turbodiesel, Intercooler	92	68	4000	196	145	2200	5MT	1,102	2,429	183	114	12.0	1993-97
ZX 1.9 TD	Break	XUD9 TE/L	1,905	Indirect injection Turbodiesel, Intercooler	92	68	4000	196	145	2200	5MT	1,150	2,535	177	110	12.5	1994-98

== Sales and production ==
Year	Worldwide Production	Worldwide sales	Notes
2009	76,000	75,500	
2010	72,000	71,800	
2011	66,327	65,545	Total production reaches 2,526,363 units.
2012	55,600	55,600	Total production reaches 2,582,000 units.
2013	55,100	55,900	Total production reaches 2,637,100 units.
2014		26,100	
2015		3,900	

== Production in China ==
The ZX was the first Citroën built in China, starting in 1992. A saloon derivative, called the Citroën Elysée, along with the China-based ZX known as the Fukang, continued to be produced for the Chinese market by the Dongfeng Peugeot-Citroën Automobile, a joint venture with the Dongfeng Motor Corporation.

== Motorsport ==
The car won the Paris-Dakar Rally four times — in 1991 with Ari Vatanen and in 1994, 1995, 1996 with Pierre Lartigue, claiming a total 59 stage wins.

It also won five FIA World Cup for Cross-Country Rallies titles, four by Pierre Lartigue between 1993-1996 and one by Ari Vatanen in 1997.

In terms of rallycross, the ZX 16V Turbo in the hands of Kenneth Hansen (rallycross) took two FIA European Rallycross Championship titles. 1994 and 1996.

The ZX Kit Car, a front-wheel-drive naturally aspirated rally car built to the F2 rules, won the 1997 Spanish rally championship thanks to Jesús Puras.
