= Rallye Alsace-Vosges =

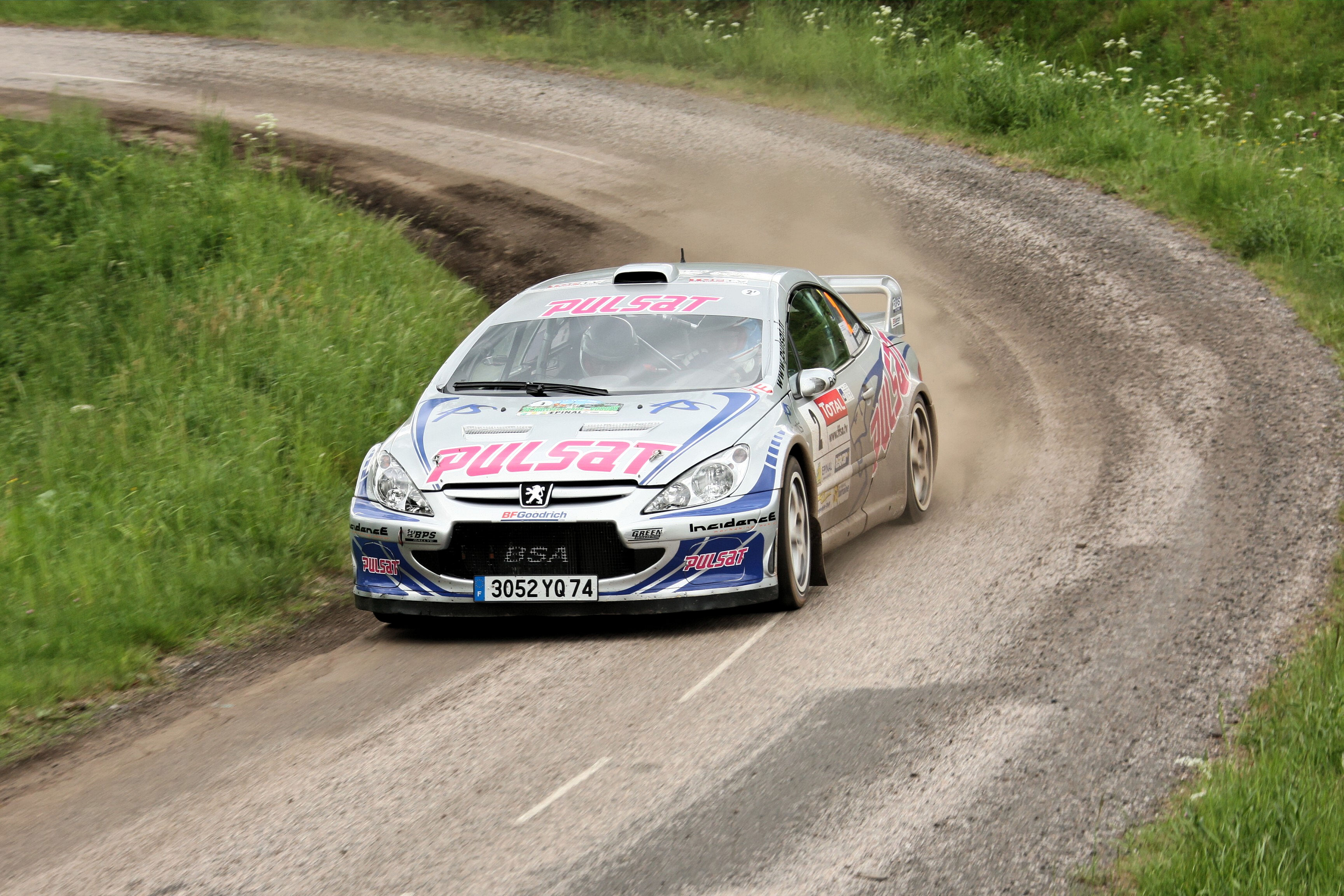
Dany Snobeck driving a Peugeot 307 WRC during the 2008 rally.

The Rallye Alsace-Vosges is a rally competition held in the Vosges, in northeastern France, between Épinal and Saint-Dié-des-Vosges. The event, first held in 1984, is a round of the French championship.

== Winners ==
Year	Driver	Co-driver	Car
2010	Cancelled		
2009	(France) Patrick Henry	(France) Magalie Lombard	Peugeot 206 WRC
2008	(France) Patrick Henry	(France) Magalie Lombard	Peugeot 307 WRC
2007	(France) Jean-Marie Cuoq	(France) David Marty	Peugeot 307 WRC
2006	(France) Nicolas Vouilloz	(France) Nicolas Klinger	Peugeot 307 WRC
2005	(France) Nicolas Bernardi	(Belgium) Jean-Marc Fortin	Peugeot 206 WRC
2004	(France) Stéphane Sarrazin	(France) Patrick Pivato	Subaru Impreza WRC
2003	(France) Brice Tirabassi	(France) Jacques-Julien Renucci	Renault Clio S1600
2002	(France) Brice Tirabassi	(France) Jacques-Julien Renucci	Citroën Saxo S1600
2001	(France) Sébastien Loeb	(Monaco) Daniel Elena	Citroën Xsara Kit-Car
2000	(France) Philippe Bugalski	(France) Jean-Paul Chiaroni	Citroën Xsara T4
1999	(France) Philippe Bugalski	(France) Jean-Paul Chiaroni	Citroën Xsara Kit-Car
1998	(France) Simon Jean-Joseph	(France) Patrick Pivato	Subaru Impreza
1997	Cancelled		
1996	(France) Gilles Panizzi	(France) Hervé Panizzi	Peugeot 306 Maxi
1995	(France) Patrick Bernardini	(France) Jean-Marc Andrié	Ford Escort RS Cosworth
1994	(France) François Chatriot	(France) Denis Giraudet	Toyota Celica 4WD
1993	(France) Bernard Béguin	(France) Jean-Paul Chiaroni	Ford Escort RS Cosworth
1992	(France) Bernard Béguin	(France) Jean-Paul Chiaroni	Ford Sierra Cosworth 4x4
1991	(France) Bernard Béguin	(France) Jean-Paul Chiaroni	Ford Sierra Cosworth 4x4
1990	(France) François Chatriot	(France) Michel Périn	BMW M3
1989	(France) Pierre-César Baroni	(France) Michel Rousseau	Ford Sierra RS Cosworth
1988	(France) François Chatriot	(France) Michel Périn	BMW M3
1987	(France) Didier Auriol	(France) Bernard Occelli	Ford Sierra RS Cosworth
1986	(France) Didier Auriol	(France) Bernard Occelli	MG Metro 6R4
1985	(France) Jean Ragnotti	(France) Pierre Thimonier	Renault 5 Maxi Turbo
1984	(France) Dufour	(France) Chenez	Talbot Samba Rallye
