= FIA World Cup for Cross-Country Rallies =

Rally raid series

- Category: Rally raid
- Country: International
- Inaugural season: 1993
- Folded: 2021
- Last Drivers' champion: (Qatar) Nasser Al-Attiyah (2021)
- Last Makes' champion: Toyota Hilux 4x4

The FIA World Cup for Cross-Country Rallies was a rally raid series organised by the FIA, culminating with a champion driver, co-driver, and team; with additional trophies awarded to T2 and T3 drivers & teams.

== History ==
Starting with the 2011 season, the previous FIA Cross-Country Rally World Cup was joined with the FIA's International Cup for Cross-Country Bajas to form the new competition. From the beginning of the 2019 season the cup was once again split, with the FIA World Cup for Cross Country Bajas being held alongside the competition for "baja" style rally raids.

From 2022, the cup merged with the FIM Cross-Country Rallies World Championship to become the World Rally-Raid Championship.

== Champions ==
Season	Driver	Co-driver	Car	2nd	3rd
1993	(France) Pierre Lartigue	(France) Michel Périn	Citroën ZX Rallye-raid	(Finland) Timo Salonen	(France) Jean-Pierre Fontenay
1994	(France) Pierre Lartigue	(France) Michel Périn	Citroën ZX Rallye-raid	(Finland) Timo Salonen	(France) Jean-Louis Schlesser
1995	(France) Pierre Lartigue	(France) Michel Périn	Citroën ZX Rallye-raid	(Finland) Ari Vatanen	(France) Jean-Louis Schlesser
1996	(France) Pierre Lartigue	(France) Michel Périn	Citroën ZX Rallye-raid	(Finland) Ari Vatanen	(France) Jean-Louis Schlesser
1997	(Finland) Ari Vatanen	(United Kingdom) Fred Gallagher	Citroën ZX Rallye-raid	(France) Pierre Lartigue	(Russia) Mikhail Naryshkin
1998	(France) Jean-Louis Schlesser	(France) Philippe Monnet	Buggy Schlesser Renault	(Japan) Kenjiro Shinozuka	(France) Jean-Pierre Fontenay
1999	(France) Jean-Louis Schlesser	(France) Philippe Monnet	Buggy Schlesser Renault	(Japan) Kenjiro Shinozuka	(Spain) José María Serviá
2000	(France) Jean-Louis Schlesser	(Andorra) Henri Magne	Buggy Schlesser Renault	(Germany) Jutta Kleinschmidt	(Spain) José María Serviá
2001	(France) Jean-Louis Schlesser	(Andorra) Henri Magne	Buggy Schlesser Renault	(Germany) Jutta Kleinschmidt	(Portugal) Carlos Sousa
2002	(France) Jean-Louis Schlesser	(Andorra) Henri Magne	Buggy Schlesser Renault	(France) Stéphane Peterhansel	(Russia) Aleksandr Khrol
2003	(Portugal) Carlos Sousa	(Andorra) Henri Magne	Mitsubishi L200 Strakar	(France) Jean-Louis Schlesser	(France) Jean-Pierre Strugo
2004	(United Arab Emirates) Khalifa Al Mutaiwei	(France) Alain Guehennec	BMW X5 CC	(France) Stéphane Peterhansel	(Portugal) Carlos Sousa
2005	(France) Bruno Saby	(France) Michel Périn	Volkswagen Race Touareg	(France) Stéphane Peterhansel	(France) Ronan Chabot
2006	(Russia) Sergey Shmakov	(Russia) Konstantin Meshcheryakov	Buggy ZIL	(South Africa) Giniel De Villiers	(France) Luc Alphand
2007	(Spain) Carlos Sainz	(France) Michel Périn	Volkswagen Race Touareg 2	(South Africa) Giniel De Villiers	(France) Luc Alphand
2008	(Qatar) Nasser Al-Attiyah	(Sweden) Tina Thörner	BMW X3 CC X-Raid	(Poland) Krzysztof Hołowczyc	(France) Luc Alphand
2009	(France) Guerlain Chicherit	(Sweden) Tina Thörner	BMW X3 CC X-Raid	(Argentina) Orlando Terranova	(United Arab Emirates) Yahya al-Heli
2010	(Russia) Leonid Novitskiy	(Germany) Andreas Schulz	BMW X3 CC X-Raid	(France) Jean-Louis Schlesser	(France) Laurent Rosso
2011	(Russia) Leonid Novitskiy	(Germany) Andreas Schulz	BMW X3 CC X-Raid	(France) Jean-Louis Schlesser	(Russia) Boris Gadasin
2012	(United Arab Emirates) Khalifa Al Mutaiwei	(Germany) Andreas Schulz	Mini All4 Racing X-Raid	(Czech Republic) Miroslav Zapletal	(France) Jean-Luis Schlesser
2013	(Poland) Krzysztof Hołowczyc	(Germany) Andreas Schulz	Mini All4 Racing X-Raid	(France) Jean-Louis Schlesser	(Spain) Joan Roma
2014	(Russia) Vladimir Vasilyev	(Russia) Konstantin Zhiltsov	Mini All4 Racing X-Raid	(Qatar) Nasser al-Attiyah	(Saudi Arabia) Yazeed Al-Rajhi
2015	(Qatar) Nasser Al-Attiyah	(France) Mathieu Baumel	Mini All4 Racing X-Raid	(Russia) Vladimir Vasilyev	(Saudi Arabia) Yazeed Al-Rajhi
2016	(Qatar) Nasser Al-Attiyah	(France) Mathieu Baumel	Toyota Hilux 4x4	(Russia) Vladimir Vasilyev	(Saudi Arabia) Yazeed Al-Rajhi
2017	(Qatar) Nasser Al-Attiyah	(France) Mathieu Baumel	Toyota Hilux 4x4	(Poland) Jakub Przygoński	(Poland) Aron Domzala
2018	(Poland) Jakub Przygoński	(Belgium) Tom Colsoul	MINI JCW Rally X-Raid	(Czech Republic) Martin Prokop	(Russia) Vladimir Vasilyev
2019	(France) Stéphane Peterhansel	(Germany) Andrea Peterhansel	MINI JCW Buggy X-Raid	(Qatar) Nasser al-Attiyah	(Brazil) Reinaldo Varela
2020	Cancelled due to COVID-19 pandemic				
2021	(Qatar) Nasser Al-Attiyah	(France) Mathieu Baumel	Toyota Hilux 4x4	(Argentina) Lucio Álvarez	(Russia) Denis Krotov
World Rally-Raid Championship

== See also ==
- Rally raid
