= Tina Thörner =

Swedish rally co-driver (born 1966)

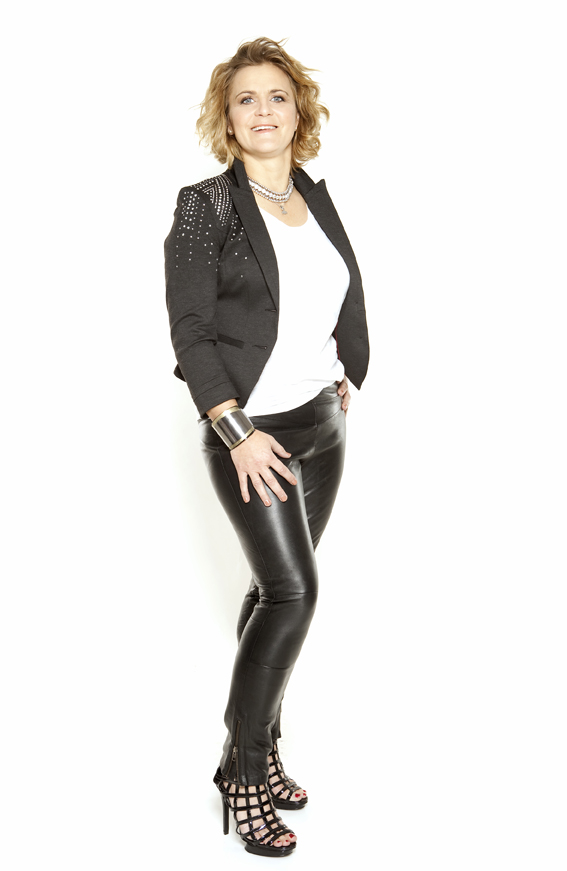
- Thörner in 2011

Personal information
- Nationality: (Sweden) Swedish
- Born: 24 February 1966 (age 60); Säffle, Sweden

World Rally Championship record
- Years active: 1985–2002
- Driver: (Sweden) Susanne Kottulinsky (Sweden) Ola Strömberg (Sweden) Lars-Erik Torph (Sweden) Fredrik Skoghag (United Kingdom) Louise Aitken-Walker (Finland) Mika Sohlberg (Sweden) Leif Asterhag (United Kingdom) Tiff Needell (Germany) Isolde Holderied (Sweden) Mikael Ericsson (Germany) Uwe Nittel (Sweden) Mattias Ekström (Sweden) Thomas Rådström (Sweden) Kenneth Eriksson
- Rallies: 77
- Championships: 0
- Rally wins: 0
- Podiums: 2
- Stage wins: 7
- First rally: 1985 RAC Rally
- Last rally: 2002 Rally GB

Maria Kristina Thörner (born in Säffle, Sweden on February 24, 1966) is a Swedish rally co-driver. Tina Thörner's career in motor sports started in 1990. Since then, she has won three FIA Ladies' World Rally Championship titles, a third and a second place overall in the Dakar Rally 1999 and 2006 and two FIA Cross-Country Rally World Cup wins in 2008 and 2009.

Thörner has co-driven for many renowned drivers, including Louise Aitken-Walker with whom she made history to become the first ever female FIA World Rally Champions. In the Dakar Rally, she raced with Jutta Kleinschmidt becoming the first women to get a podium finish in 1999, and with Colin McRae in 2004 and 2005. In 2008, she won her first FIA Cross-Country Rally World Cup with Nasser Al Attiyah.

Thörner also appeared in Let's Dance 2011 and a guest panelist in two episodes of Intresseklubben.

== Career ==
=== Rallying ===
In 1990, co-driver Thörner and driver Louise Aitken-Walker made history by becoming the first ever FIA Ladies' World Rally Champions.

In 1999, Thörner competed with driver Jutta Kleinschmidt in the Dakar Rally. Three days into the race after its fifth stage, Tina and Jutta were overall rally leaders. In the end, they finished third overall and were the first women to get a podium finish at the Dakar Rally.

Thörner made history again in 2008 by winning the FIA Cross Country Rally World Cup with Nasser Al-Attiyah becoming the first Middle Eastern man and European Woman to do so.

Thörner has co-driven with drivers Lars-Erik Torph, Carina Hermanson, Susanne Kottulinsky, Mats Jonsson, Ola Strömberg, Mats Karlsson, Leif Asterhag, Louise Atiken-Walker, Isolde Holderied, Simon Davison, Uwe Nittel, Mika Solberg, Mattias Ekström, Jutta Kleinschmidt, Thomas Rådström, Kenneth Eriksson, Ari Vatanen, Colin McRae, Giniel De Villiers, Nasser al-Attiyah and Guerlain Chicherit.
