= Citroën Xsara =

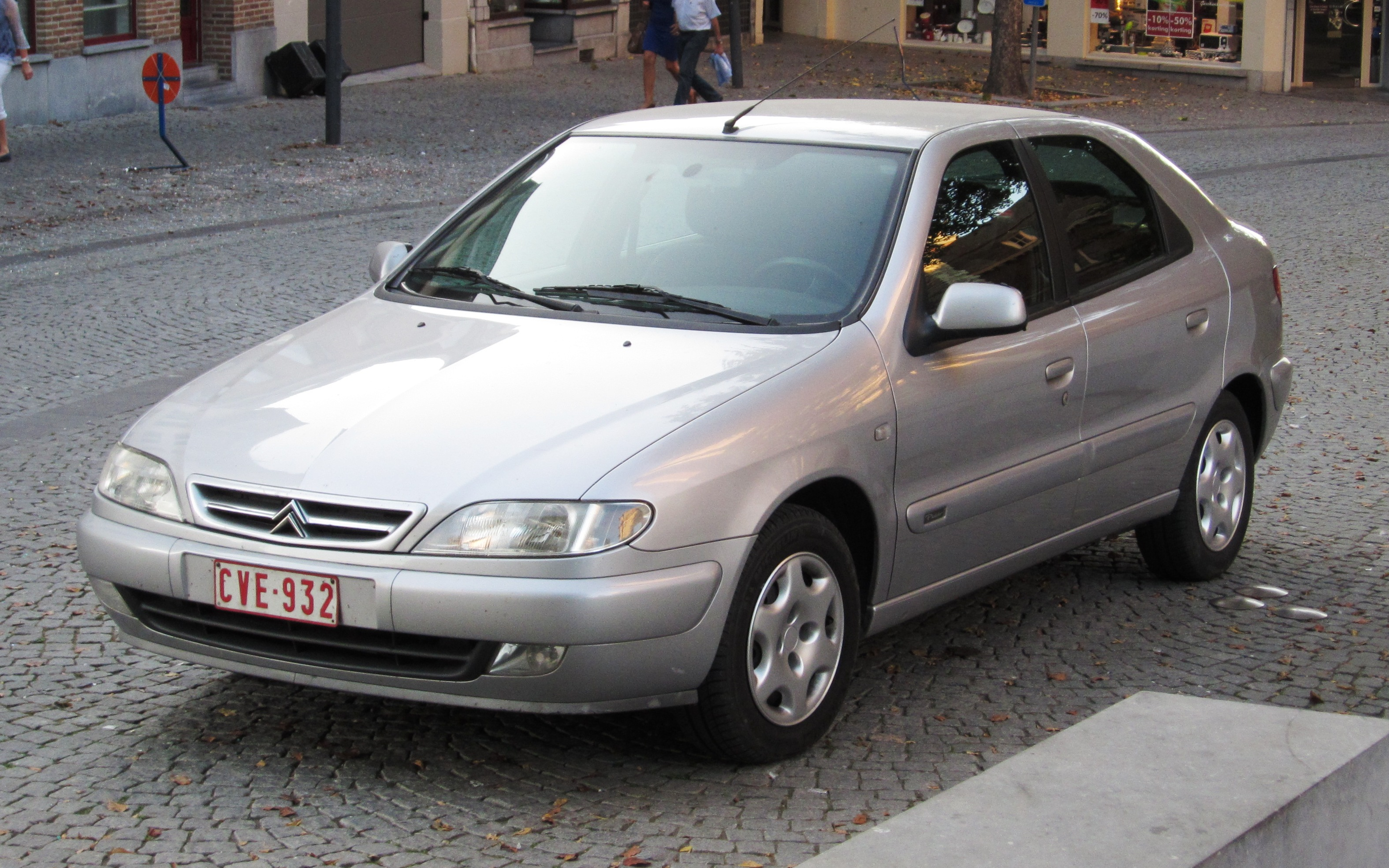

Overview
- Manufacturer: Citroën (PSA Peugeot Citroën)
- Production: 1997–2006
- Assembly: France: Rennes (PSA Rennes Plant); Spain: Villaverde, Madrid; Spain: Vigo (PSA Vigo Plant); Uruguay: Barra de Carrasco (Oferol); China: Wuhan, Hubei; Egypt: Cairo (AAV)
- Designer: Donato Coco, Giles Taylor

Body and chassis
- Class: Small family car (C)
- Body style: 5-door hatchback (notchback); 3-door hatchback (notchback); 5-door estate
- Layout: Front-engine, front-wheel-drive
- Related: Citroën ZX; Peugeot 306; Citroën Xsara Picasso

Dimensions
- Wheelbase: 2,540 mm (100.0 in)
- Length: 5-door: 4,167–4,188 mm (164.1–164.9 in); 3-door: 4,167–4,188 mm (164.1–164.9 in); Estate: 4,350–4,369 mm (171.3–172.0 in)
- Width: 1,705 mm (67.1 in)
- Height: 5-door: 1,405 mm (55.3 in); Estate: 1,420 mm (55.9 in)

Chronology
- Predecessor: Citroën ZX
- Successor: Citroën C4; Citroën C4 Picasso (for estate)

The Citroën Xsara (/ˈzɑːrə/) is a compact C-segment family car, produced by the French automaker PSA Peugeot Citroën, under their Citroën marque, from 1997 to 2006. The Xsara was a development of the Citroën ZX and Peugeot 306, which shared a platform and running gear.

It came in three and five door hatchback (notchback) and five door estate body styles; the estate was marketed as the Break and the three door as the Coupé. The styling shared cues with the larger Bertone designed Xantia, but was regarded as bland by the motoring press.

The straight-four engine range includes 1.4, 1.6, 1.8 and 2.0 litre petrol engines as well as 1.4, 1.8, 1.9 and 2.0 litre naturally aspirated and turbocharged diesels. In some countries, such as Portugal, the 1.5 litre TUD5 diesel engine was also available. The Xsara was 1998 Semperit Irish Car of the Year in Ireland.

== Chassis design ==
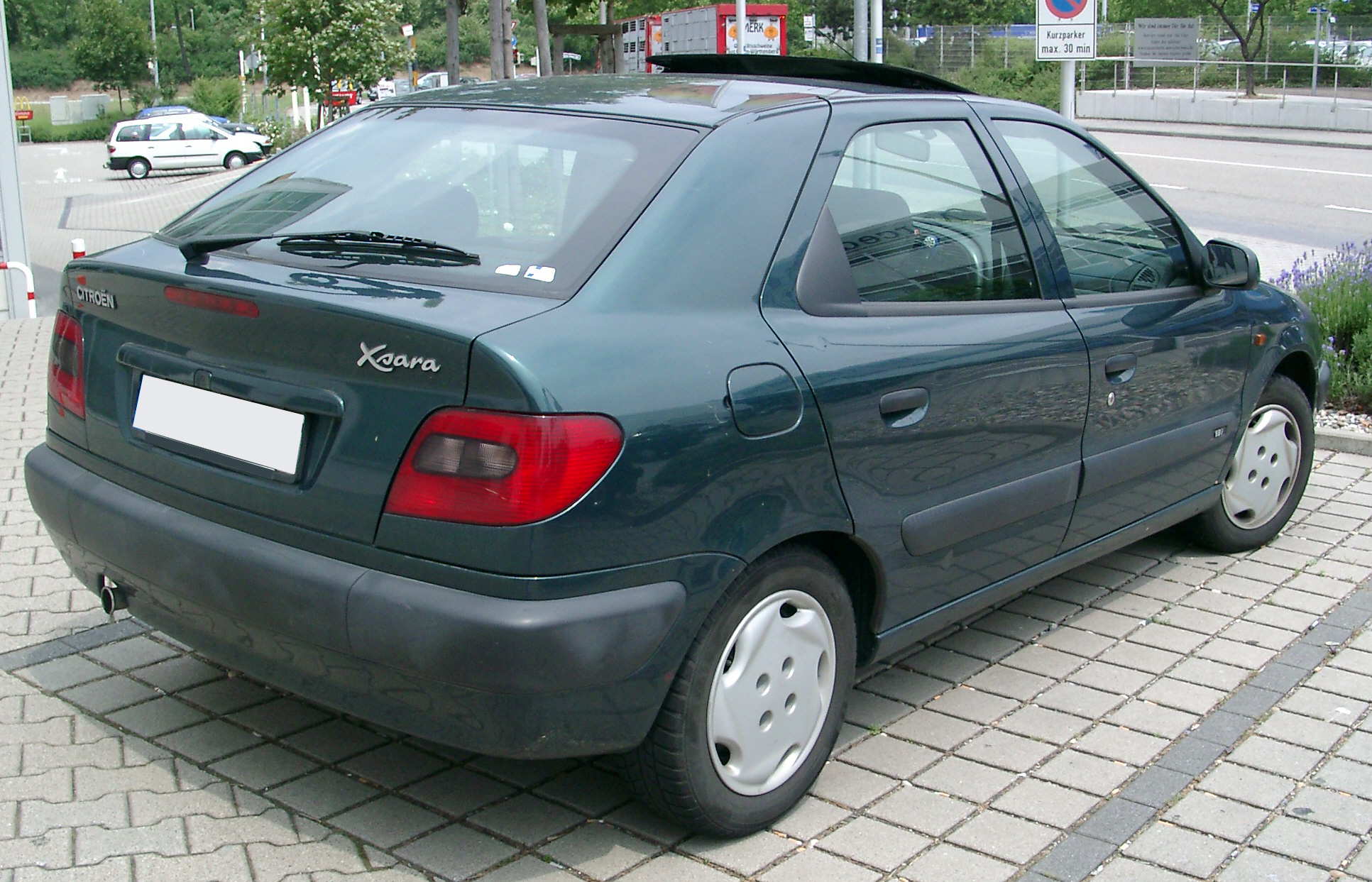
Pre facelift rear

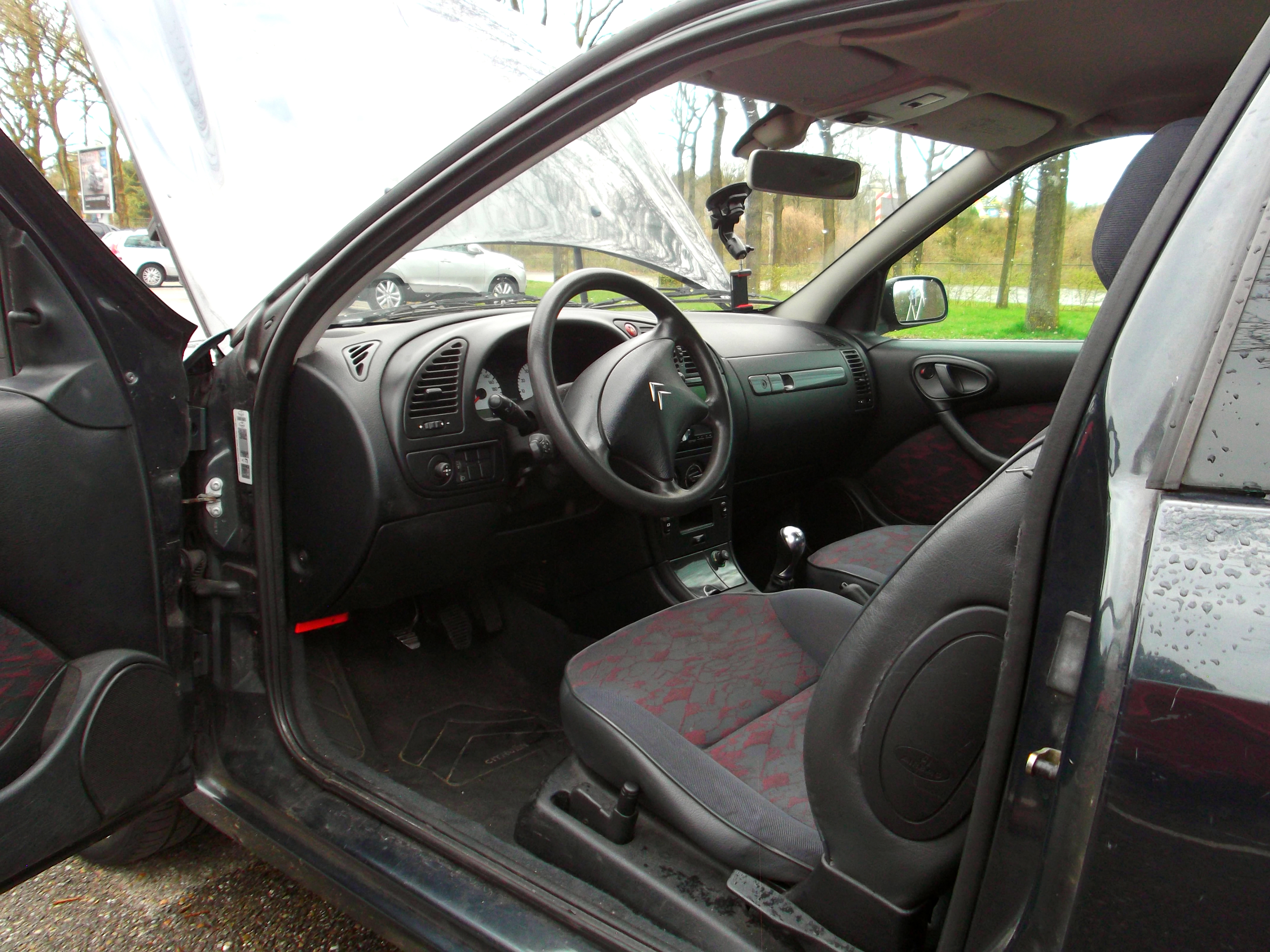
Interior

The familiar range of PSA powertrains drove the front wheels of a seemingly conventionally designed chassis. At the front was a standard MacPherson strut layout with anti-roll bar, while the rear used the PSA Peugeot-Citroën fully independent trailing arm/torsion bar set up, which was first introduced on the estate of the Peugeot 305.

However, PSA's chassis engineers employed some unusual features, including passive rear wheel steering by means of specially designed compliance bushes in the rear suspension – though less pronounced than on the ZX – and in-house developed and constructed shock absorbers.

At high mileages, this is prone to wear of the axle mounting bushes which is easily fixed. It is also prone to wear in the rear axle trailing arm bearings, which then wear the trailing arm axle tubes, requiring an expensive rebuild or a replacement axle assembly.

The diesel and larger capacity petrol engines are canted as far back as possible in the engine bay, in an effort to put as much weight as possible behind the front axle line, also reducing the centre of gravity, while improving weight distribution and minimising understeer.

== Overview ==
=== Pre-facelift ===
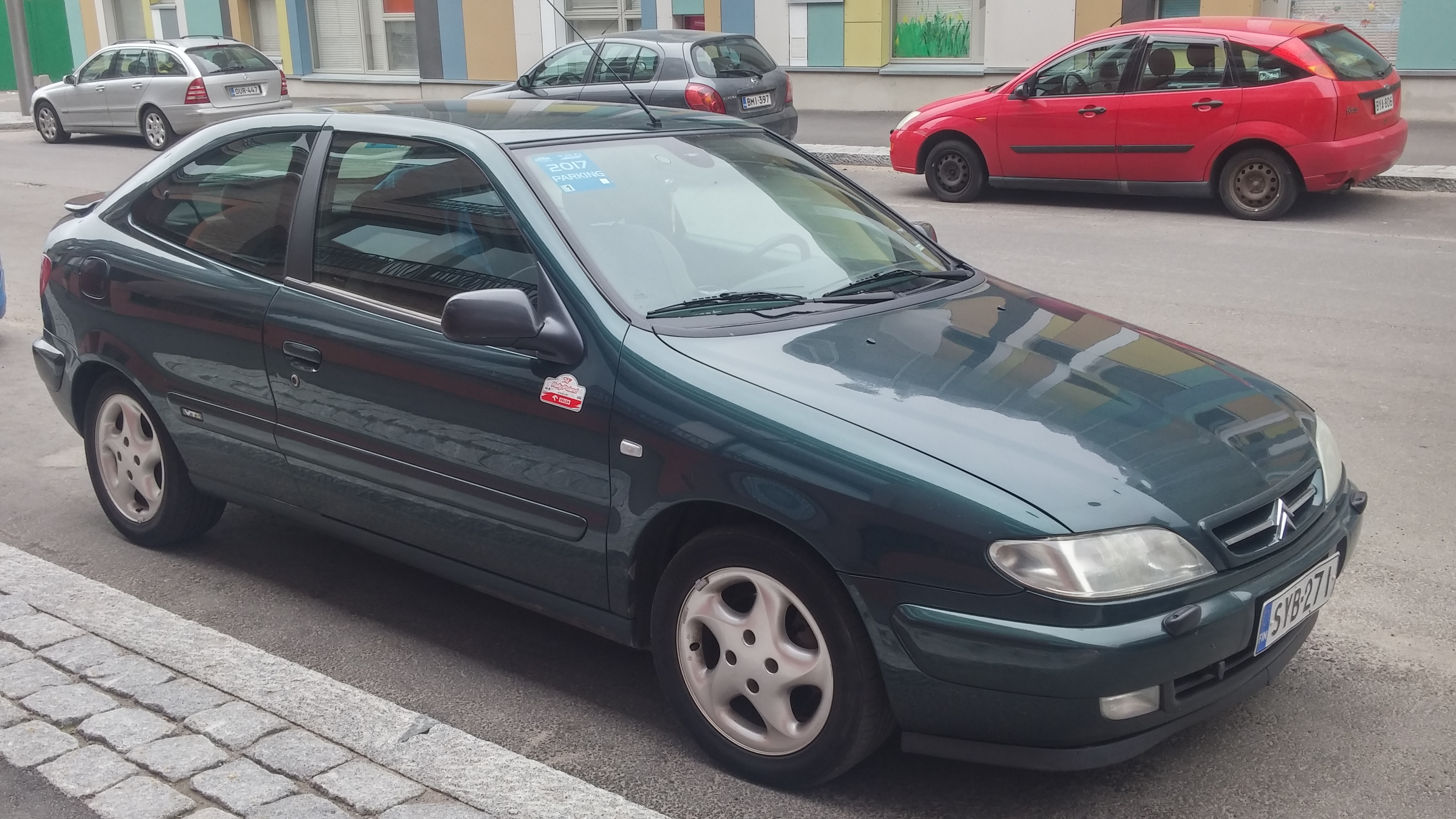
Citroën Xsara Coupé

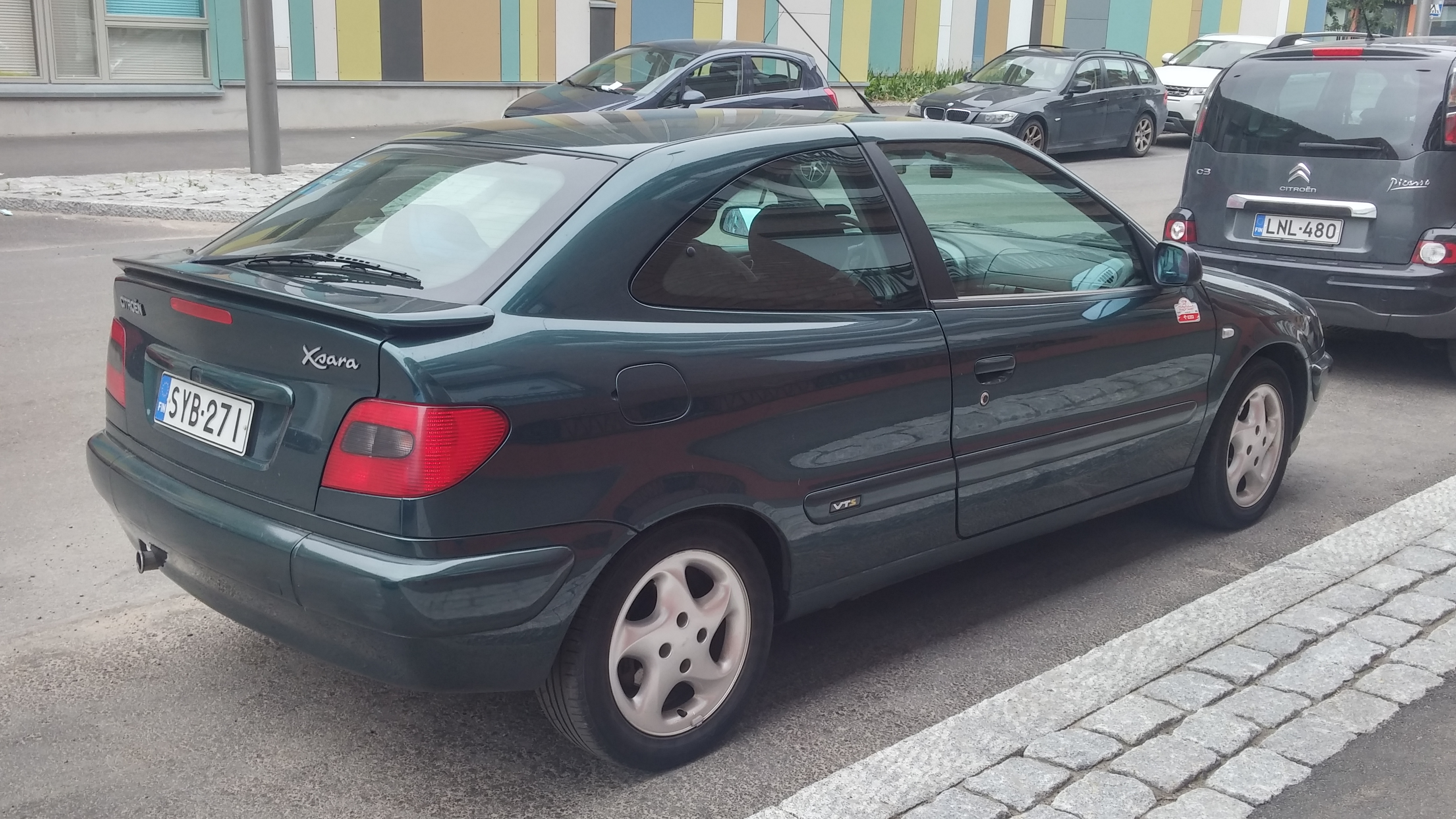
Citroën Xsara Coupé rear

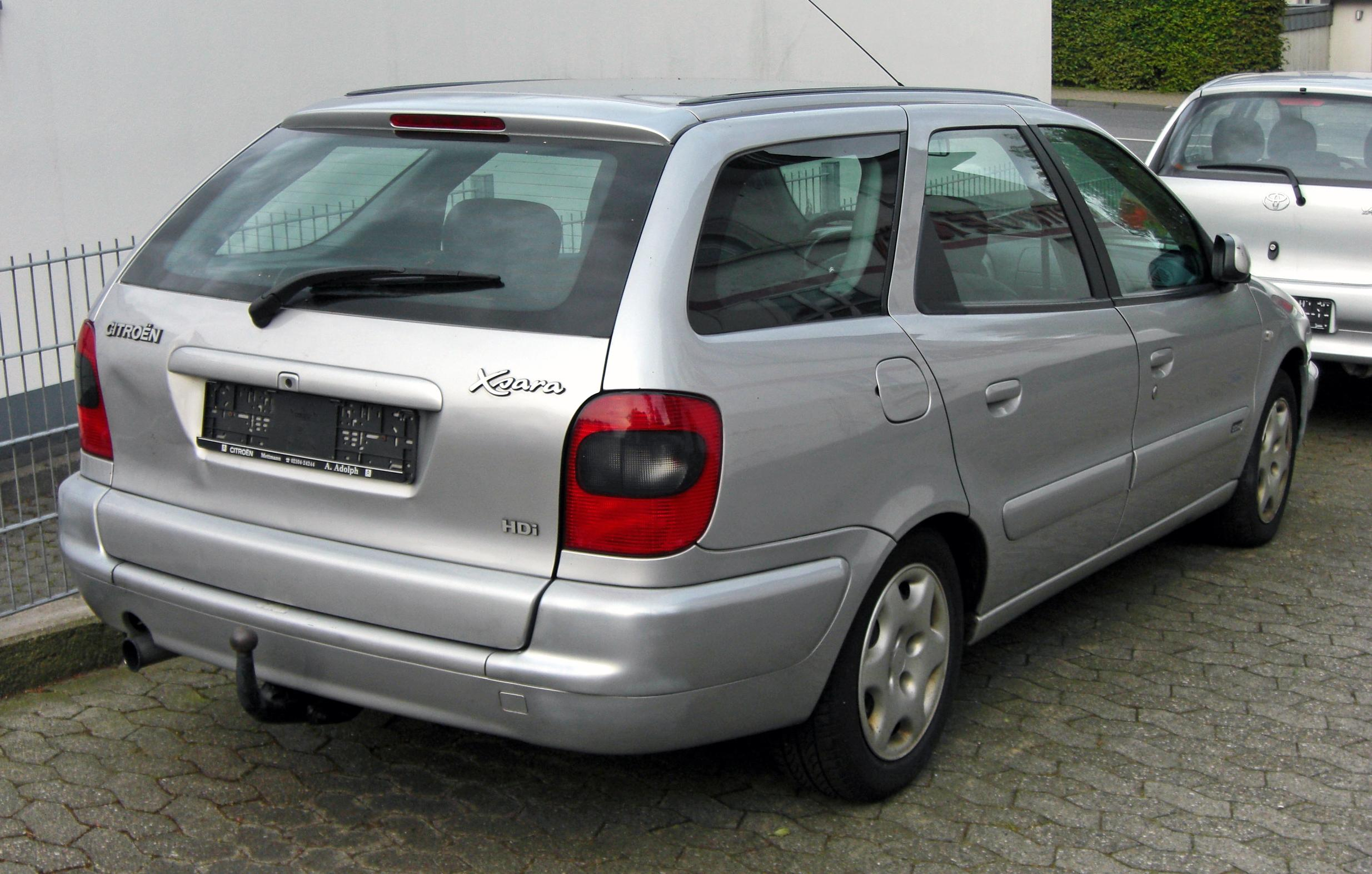
Citroën Xsara Break

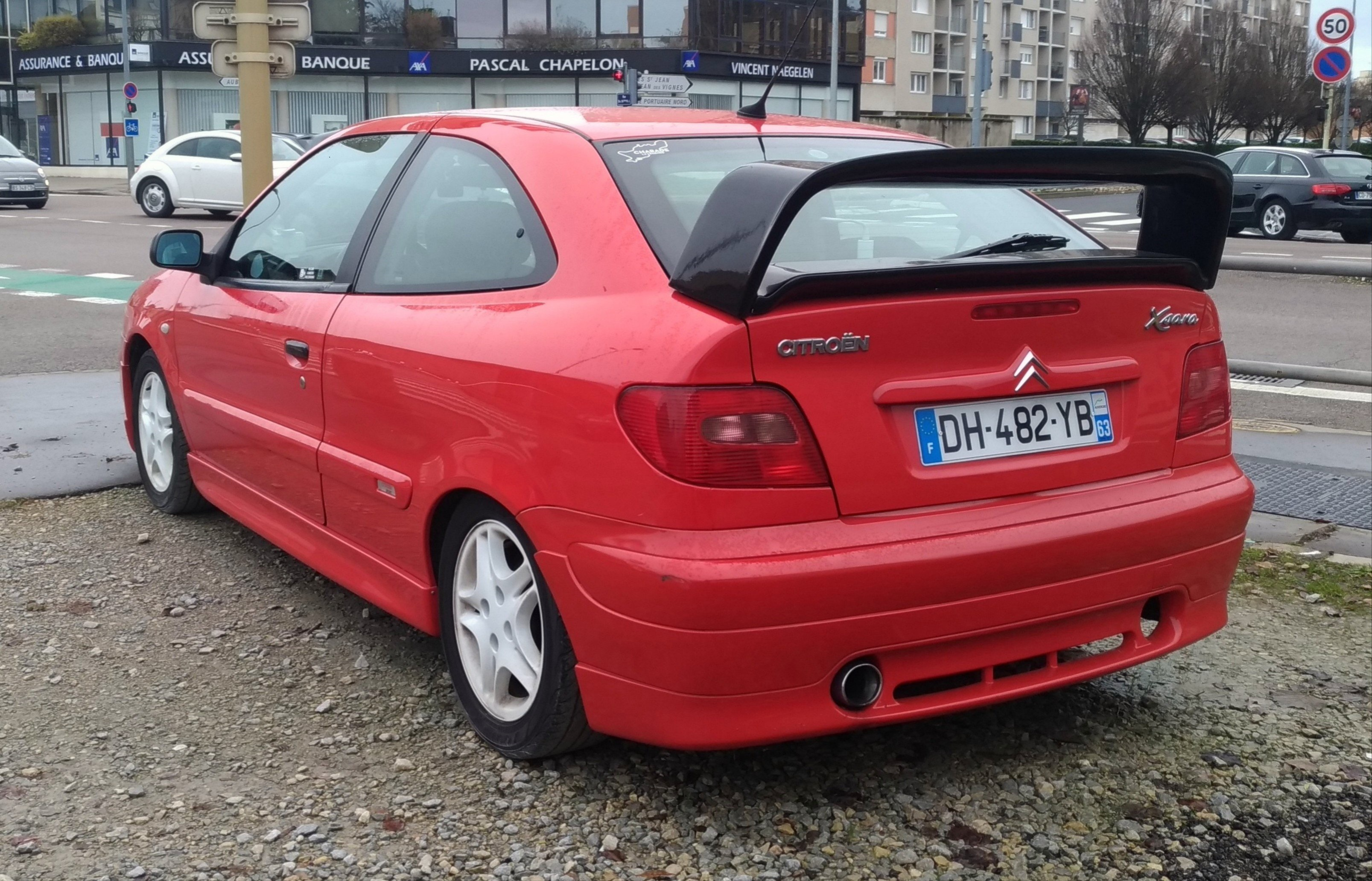
Citroën Xsara VTS Sport

The original Xsara was launched in September 1997, and was available with different engine choices:

- 1.4L (1361 cc 8 valve SOHC) 55 kW (75 PS; 74 hp) TU3JP 4-cylinder petrol, 111 Nm
- 1.6L (1587 cc) 66 kW (90 PS; 89 hp) TU5JP four cylinder petrol, 136 Nm
- 1.8L (1761 cc) 66 kW (90 PS; 89 hp) XU7JB four cylinder petrol
- 1.8L (1761 cc) 76 kW (103 PS; 102 hp) XU7JP four cylinder petrol
- 1.8L (1761 cc 16-valve DOHC) 82 kW (110 hp) XU7JP4 four cylinder petrol, 155 Nm
- 2.0L (1998 cc) 92 kW (125 PS; 123 hp) XU10J2C four cylinder petrol
- 2.0L (1998 cc 16 valve DOHC) 99 kW (135 PS; 133 hp) XU10J4R four cylinder petrol
- 2.0L (1998 cc 16 valve DOHC) 123 kW (167 PS; 165 hp) XU10J4RS four-cylinder petrol (Xsara VTS)
- 1.5L (1527 cc) 43 kW (58 PS; 58 hp) TUD5 diesel
- 1.9L (1905 cc) 50 kW (68 PS; 67 hp) XUD9A diesel
- 1.9L (1868 cc) 51 kW (69 PS; 68 hp) DW8 diesel
- 1.9L (1905 cc) 55 kW (75 PS; 74 hp) XUD9B SD diesel
- 1.9L (1905 cc) 66 kW (90 PS; 89 hp) XUD9TE turbodiesel
- 2.0L (1997 cc) 66 kW (90 PS; 89 hp) DW10TD turbodiesel
- 2.0L (1997 cc) 80 kW (109 PS; 107 hp) DW10ATED turbodiesel

=== Facelift ===
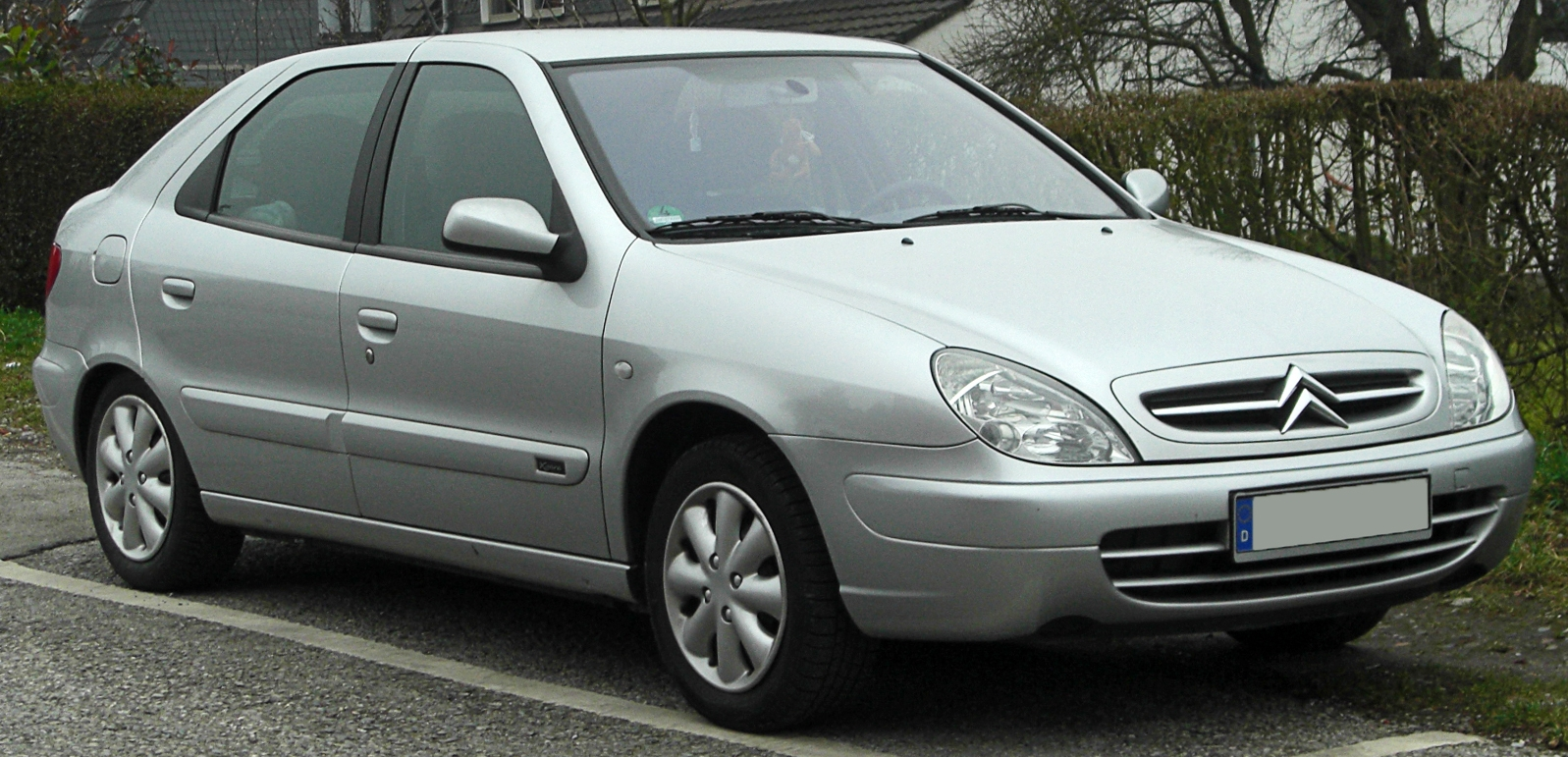
Post facelift Citroën Xsara

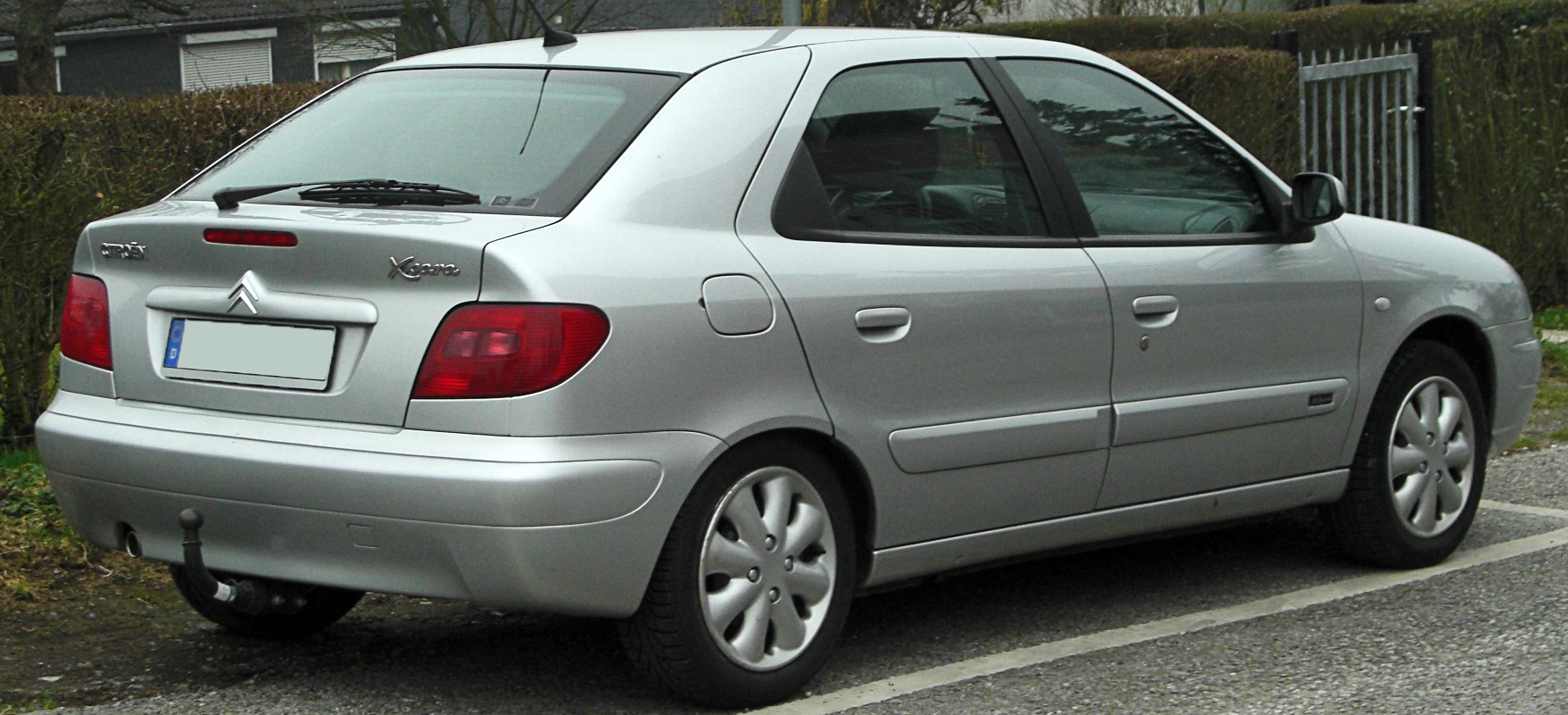
Post facelift rear

In September 2000, for the 2001 model year, the Xsara was substantially facelifted with a new bonnet, wings, bumper, grille and headlamps with integrated fog lights. The rear end of the car saw slight changes to the light cluster and the introduction of a new hatch with a prominent logo. The car was now heavier (around 80 kg) and longer (21 mm). The body was made stiffer with A pillars and side-door beams reinforced. The tracks were also widened and 15-inch wheels were now sold as standard. Trims and materials were improved and the new steering wheel taken over from Citroën C5 enabled the installation of a bigger airbag. The instrument displays were now clearer with side and curtain airbags made available on higher trims. The facelift also saw the introduction of multiplex wiring.

New 16-valve engines of 1.6 and 2.0 litres' displacement were introduced, while the earlier 1.8-litre engine was removed from the lists. As of the facelift, the Xsara was offered with following engine choices:

- 1.4L (1361 cc 8 valve SOHC) 55 kW (75 PS; 74 hp) TU3JP four cylinder petrol 121 Nm (catalyst and its position were changed).
- 1.6L (1587 cc 16 valve DOHC) 81 kW (110 PS; 109 hp) TU5 JP4 four cylinder petrol (new, replaced 8-valve TU5JP engine)
- 2.0L (1998 cc 16 valve DOHC) 122 kW (166 PS; 164 hp) XU10J4RS four cylinder petrol (used till 2002)
- 2.0L (1998 cc 16 valve DOHC) 101 kW (137 PS; 135 hp) EW10 J4 four cylinder petrol (new, replaced XU10 engine)
- 1.4L (1398 cc) HDI 50 kW (68 PS; 67 hp) DW4TD January 2004–December 2004
- 1.5L (1527 cc) 43 kW (58 PS; 58 hp) TUD5 diesel
- 1.9L (1868 cc) 51 kW (69 PS; 68 hp) DW8 diesel (used till 2002)
- 1.9L (1868 cc) 53 kW (72 PS; 71 hp) DW8B diesel (new)
- 2.0L (1997 cc) 66 kW (90 PS; 89 hp) DW10TD turbodiesel (catalyst was changed, later central silencer was removed)
- 2.0L (1997 cc) 79 kW (107 PS; 106 hp) DW10ATED turbodiesel (new)

The 2002 model had slight interior modifications (e.g. a different way of controlling the sound system from the steering wheel). In February 2003, there were also some exterior modifications (e.g. new front bumper, new instrument panel design with Eurostile typeface (to replace the Futura typeface) with dial design from the Peugeot 307).

The Xsara hatchback was discontinued in Europe, and replaced by the C4 in November 2004. Dongfeng Peugeot-Citroën Automobile, a joint venture between Dongfeng and the PSA Group, continued to manufacture the Xsara hatchback one more year.

In Europe, the Xsara Estate continued to be produced until 2006 and did not get a replacement. The Xsara Picasso small MPV was continued, concurrently with its successor that was based on the C4, 'Picasso' becoming the name for MPV derivatives of any Citroën model.

=== Xsara Dynalto & Dynactive ===
A prototype mild hybrid was developed in 1998 after the release of the 1997 Toyota Prius. The Dynalto uses an integrated starter alternator in between the engine and gearbox to accomplish multiple things to improve fuel economy:

- Starting the engine
- Overboost to add an 8hp boost during acceleration
- Stop and Start which turns the engine off after sitting idle for 2 seconds and starts the engine quickly with the electric motor when moving again

Updated in 2000 and unveiled at the 2000 Geneva Motor Show, the Xsara Dynactive prototype used the experience they gained from the Xsara Dynalto, Saxo Dynavolt, and Berlingo Dynavolt to produce a parallel hybrid. This differs from earlier models as the Dynalto was a mild hybrid and the Dynavolt twins were series hybrids. Based on the estate version, the Dynactive had a 55 kW (74 hp) 1.4L gasoline engine, paired with a permanent magnet synchronous motor in between the engine and automatic transmission, connected via a wet clutch. The computer controlled when the electric motor was needed and could add or recover power as needed. It had an electric only range of 20 km (12 mi) which could be used by a special selection on the gear shift called ZEV (Zero Emision Vehicle).

This technology was later utilized in the Citroën C3 and is called Stop & Start.

=== Computer technology prototypes and Windows CE edition ===
In 1997, Intel partnered with Citroën to produce one of the first cars with computer integration. After their experience with building the 1995 Citroën Evasion Windows 95 edition, they partnered with Intel to continue their push for technology in vehicles. Displayed at Internationale Automobile Ausstellung (IAA), the Xsara was very advanced for the time, including the ability to:

- Play DVD films with Dolby Surround Sound Stereo
- Update the driver with the latest traffic news with RDS Radio
- Read incoming emails using a text to speech converter when requested using the Connected Car PC
- Update the driver with the weather, traffic, and tourism by downloading information on demand from the Internet using the Connected Car PC

This car was a demonstration for their push for developing technology for the car, and the new Pentium processor powering it. The Connected Car PC continued development and pushed the boundaries of what was possible in a car.

In 1998, an updated prototype called the Auto PC was displayed at the Consumer Electronics Show (CES) in Las Vegas in January 1998. This updated model featured a head unit designed in partnership with Microsoft and Clarion, with a big focus on voice recognition. Developed by Lernout and Hauspie Speech Products, voice recognition was a new way for technology to be utilized in the car. This, paired with the Windows CE 2.0 operating system, the Auto PC allows the driver to ask for and receive GPS data, request to call a specific person, obtain weather and stock market info, and even have emails read to them. For contact storage, sometimes a PDA was used to transfer contacts for the radio to remember for future use using an infrared receiver utilizing IrDA communication. This later resulted in the Auto PC head unit being sold to the public in 1999.

In 2000, Citroën used their knowledge to produce the Xsara Windows CE edition. 500 examples were produced after a three-year development with Microsoft. It featured an updated Auto PC head unit from the 1998 prototype and claimed the title as the first Windows operating system capable car, first car equipped with a dual band GSM communications system and color navigation unit, and the first car equipped with a voice recognition system that controls operation of the information system.

The features of this trim level included:

- GPS navigation run on a disc held behind the removable front panel
- The ability to receive and listen to an email
- The ability to send e-mails by sending a stored message or typing on the integrated keyboard when the vehicle is stopped
- Hands-free mobile phone operation utilizing an Ericsson T28S cell phone that came with the car including hands free calling and the ability to send SMS text messages
- Address book storage and the ability to interface with a PDA device
- 6 disc CD changer in the trunk

== See also ==
- Citroën Total World Rally Team
