= Buggy Schlesser =

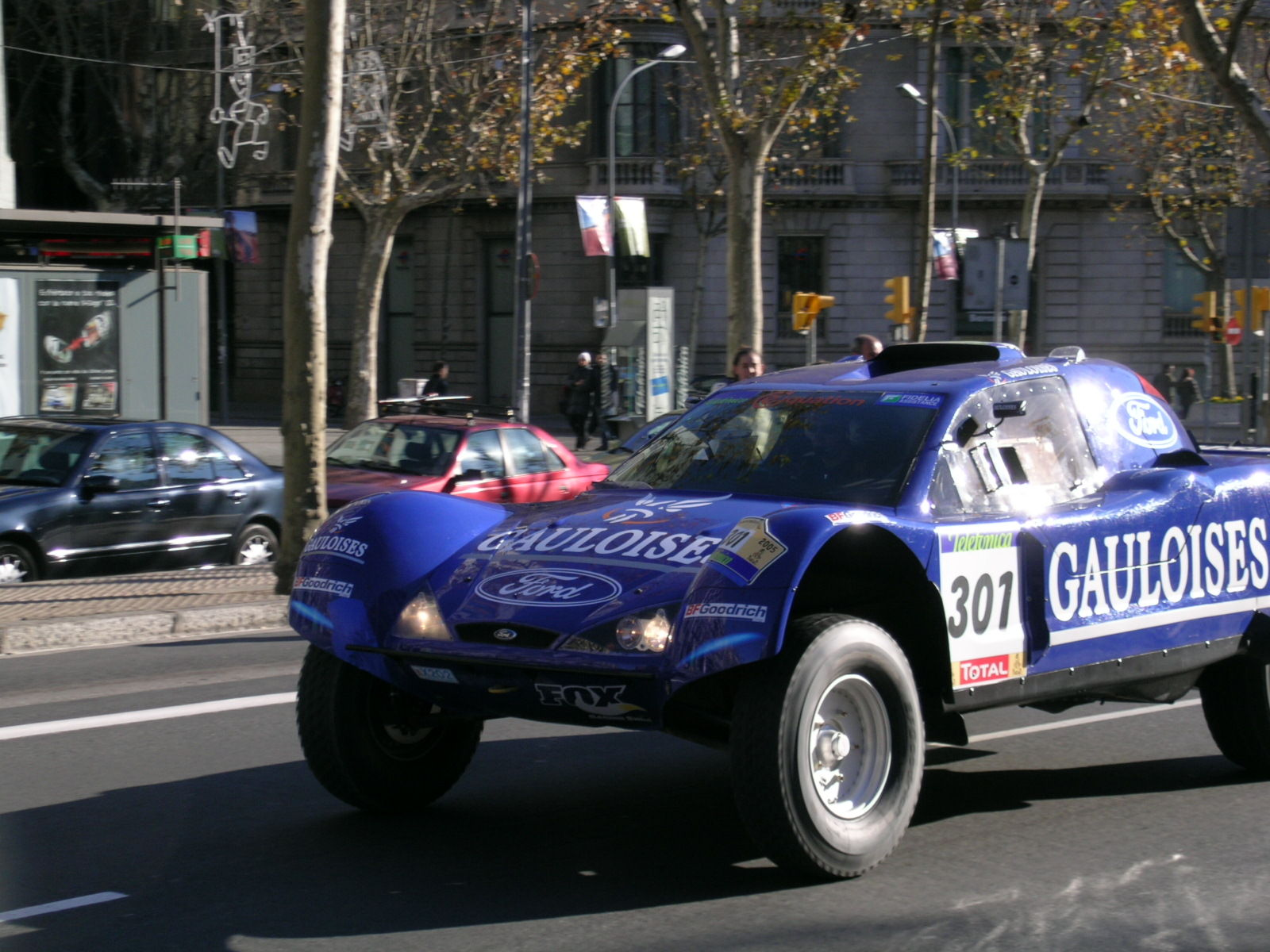

Overview
- Manufacturer: Jean-Louis Schlesser
- Also called: Buggy Schlesser MK II
- Production: 1992–2014

Body and chassis
- Class: Rally raid
- Body style: Dune Buggy
- Layout: Front-mid engine, RWD
- Chassis: Space frame

Powertrain
- Engine: 5,409 cc (330.1 cu in) Schlesser-Triton V8
- Power output: 285 CV (281 bhp); 450 lb⋅ft (610 N⋅m)
- Transmission: 6-speed manual

Dimensions
- Wheelbase: 3,000 mm (120 in)
- Length: 4,500 mm (180 in)
- Width: 2,750 mm (108 in)
- Height: 1,700 mm (67 in)
- Curb weight: 1,400 kg (3,100 lb)

The Buggy Schlesser is an off-road competition car specially designed by the French racing driver Jean-Louis Schlesser to take part in the rally raids.

== Results ==
- 5 wins FIA Cross-Country Rally World Cup (from 1998 to 2002)
- 2 wins Rally Dakar (1999, 2000)
- 6 wins Africa Race (from 2009 to 2014)
- 6 wins Rallye de Tunisie (from 1998 to 2000, 2003, 2007, 2010)
- 2 wins Rallye des Pharaons (2010, 2011)
- 6 wins Abu Dhabi Desert Challenge (1994, 1995, 1998, 1999, 2000, 2001)
- 4 wins Rallye du Maroc (2000, 2001, 2002, 2009, 2010)
- 2 wins Italian Baja (1998, 2002)
- 2 wins Baja Portugal 1000 (1992, 2000)

== Gallery ==
Gallery

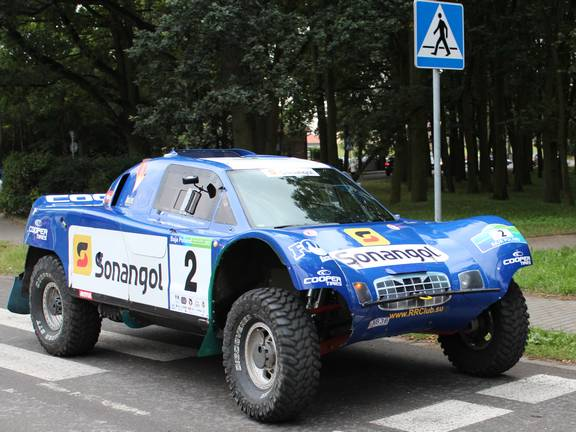

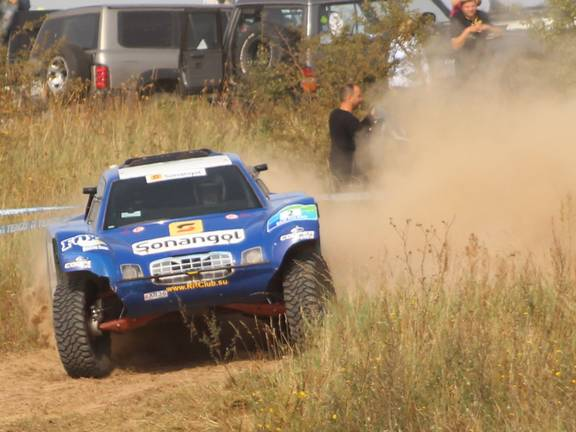

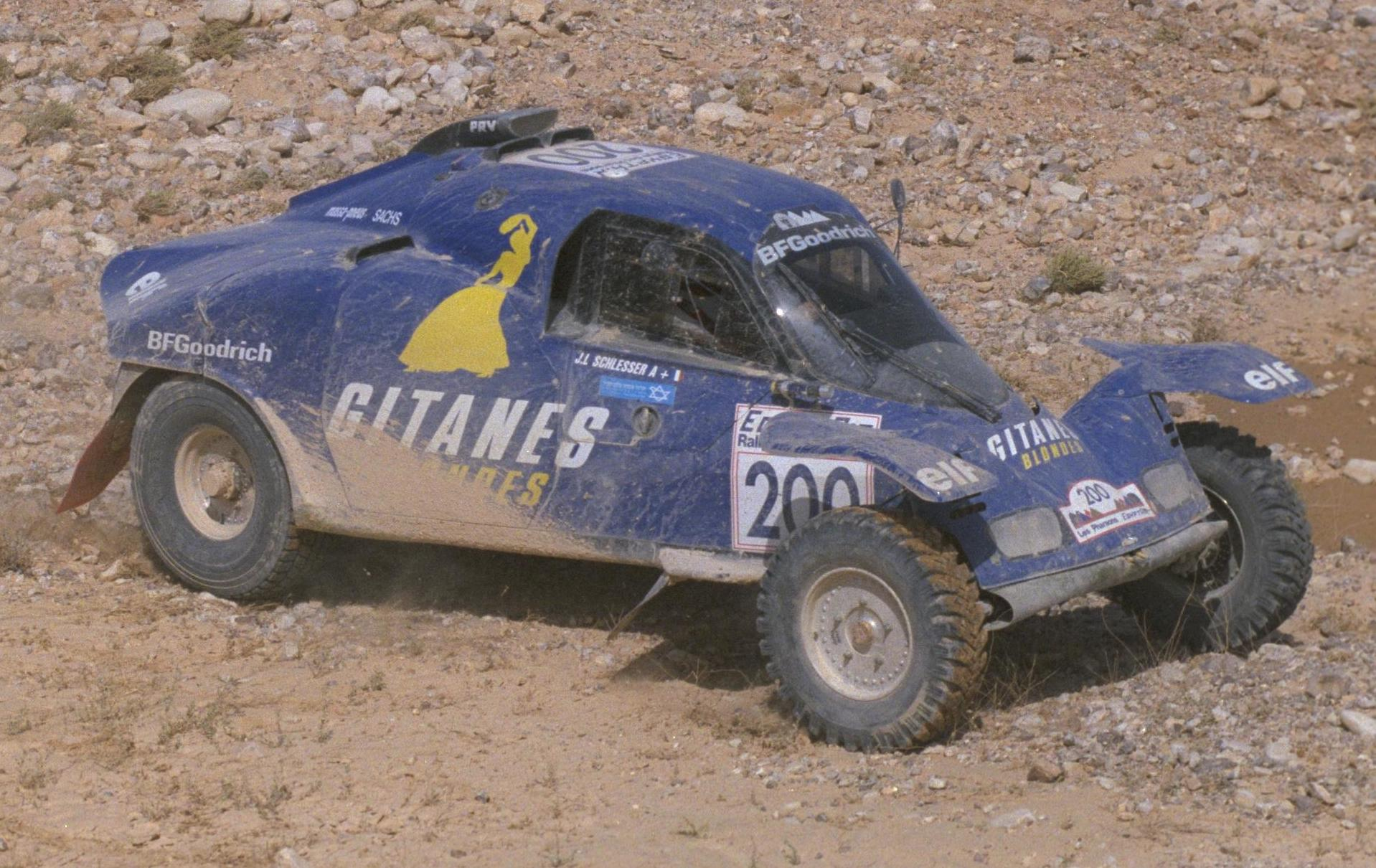

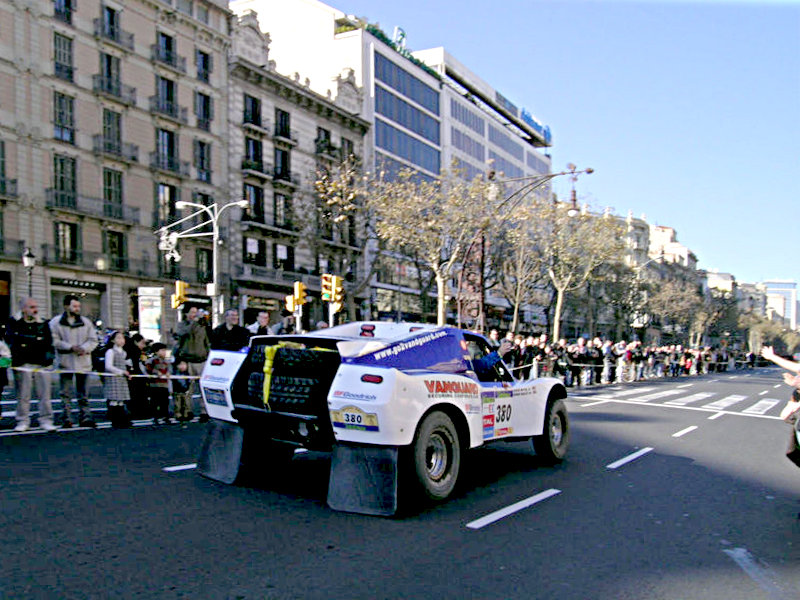
