= Michel Périn =

French rally navigator (born 1957)

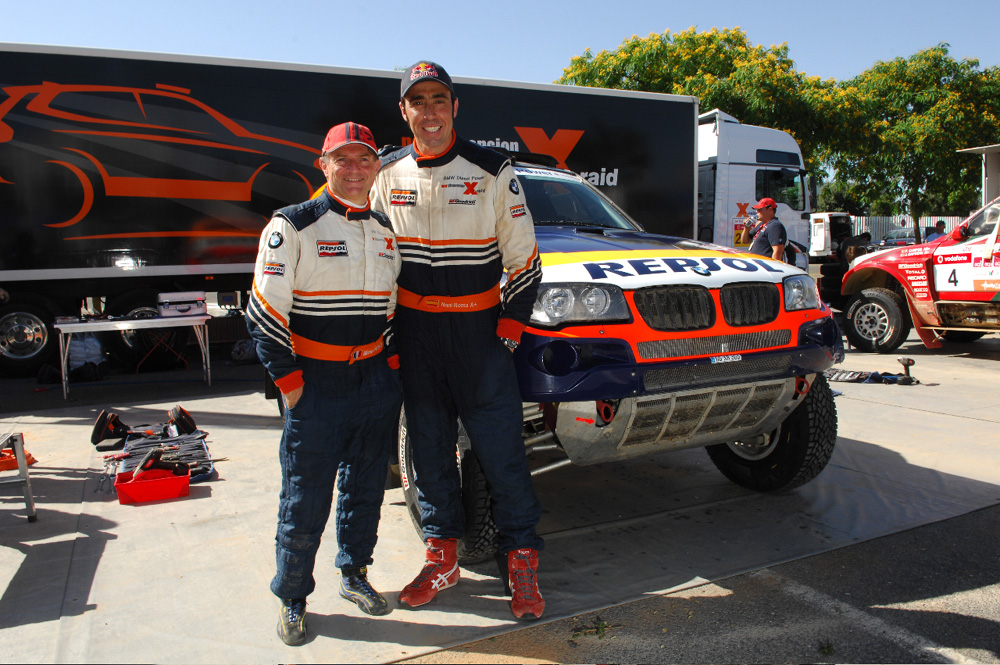
Michel Périn and Nani Roma in the Rally Transibérico 2009

Michel Périn (born 19 January 1957, in Saint-Mihiel) is a French rally navigator.

== Biography ==
He started racing in 1977. In 1984 he turned professional as co-pilot of François Chatriot, and finished second in the French Rally Championship, championship that he would win in 1988, 1989 and 1990.

He changed to off-road rally racing in 1992, to the side of Pierre Lartigue, winning the Dakar Rally in 1994, 1995 and 1996. He also achieved multiple victories and podium finishes in many of the most important offroad races, including Rally of Tunisia, Atlas Rally, Baja Italy, Spanish Baja and Baja Portugal. From 1993 to 1996, he won the FIA Cross Country World Cup.

In 1997 and 1998 he switched again to rally, participating in the French Rally Championship with the driver Patrick Magaud.

He ended his career at the end of 1998, turning into team manager of Citroën Sport. Six years later, he returned in 2004, sharing cockpit with Guerlain Chicherit. In 2005, he signed for the Volkswagen Motorsport Team. Being Bruno Saby's codriver, he won the FIA Cross Country World Cup for 5th time in his career, including victories on Rally of Morocco and Rallye d'Orient, and a fifth place in the Dakar Rally. In 2007, riding with Carlos Sainz, he won again the Cross Country World Cup, after winning the Rally Transibérico and finishing second in the Rally of Morocco and the UAE Desert Challenge. They were 9th in the final classification of the Dakar Rally, after suffering a breakdown. After the 2007 killing of French tourists in Mauritania, the Dakar Rally effectively moved to Central Europe for 2008, which the pair won. In the 2009 Dakar Rally, after leading the classification for several days, he and Sainz suffered an accident because of the lack of documentation in the roadbook. Périn broke his arm, and the team was forced to abandon the race.

In 2009, he was contracted by BMW as co-driver of Nani Roma in a BMW X3, winning the Baja Spain that year. In the 2010 Dakar Rally, they accomplished a great start, winning the first stage, but after two accidents, they had to abandon in third stage.

In 2015, Périn became co-driver of Finn rally raid driver Mikko Hirvonen for X-Raid. In 2018 he will again compete in the Dakar Rally as co-driver of Dutchman Bernhard ten Brinke with a Toyota Hi-Lux for Toyota Gazoo Racing South Africa.
