= Rally of Tunisia =

- Region: Tunisia
- Inaugural season: 1981
- Official website: Rallye de Tunisie

The rally of Tunisia (Rallye de Tunisie) is a rally-raid which was disputed each year in Tunisia from 1981 to 2011.

== Editions ==
Year	Cars		Bikes	
Year	Driver - Co-driver	Car	Driver	Bike
1981	(France) Jean-Claude Briavoine - Catherine Plessis	Lada	(France) Luc Duriez	Yamaha
1982	(France) Jacques Regis - Yves Hollebecq	Range Rover	(France) Gilles Moneret	Yamaha
1983	not held			
1984	(France) Arnault Lucbert - Patrick Destaillats	Range Rover	(France) Gilles Picard	SWM
1985	(Spain) Mikel Prieto - Julio Vázquez	Nissan	(France) Pierre Marie Poli	Yamaha
1986	(France) Pierre Lartigue - René Ponte	Lada	(France) Marc Joineau	Suzuki
1987	(France) Jean Da Silva - Bernard Maingrets	Mitsubishi	(Spain) Carles Mas	Yamaha
1988	(Finland) Ari Vatanen - Bruno Berglund	Peugeot 405 Turbo 16	(Italy) Alessandro De Petri	Cagiva
1989	(France) Pierre Lartigue - Bernard Maingrets	Mitsubishi	(Italy) Alessandro De Petri	Cagiva
1990	(France) Pierre Lartigue - Henri Magne	Mitsubishi	(France) Stéphane Peterhansel	Yamaha
1991	not held			
1992	(France) Pierre Lartigue - Michel Périn	Citroën	(Italy) Luigi Medardo	Yamaha
1993	(Qatar) Saeed Al Hajri - Henri Magne	Mitsubishi	(Italy) Flavio Agradi	Gilera
1994	(France) Pierre Lartigue - Michel Périn	Citroën	(France) Stéphane Peterhansel	Yamaha
1995	(France) Pierre Lartigue - Michel Périn	Citroën	(France) Alain Olivier	Yamaha
1996	(France) Pierre Lartigue - Michel Périn	Citroën	(France) Thierry Magnaldi	KTM
1997	(France) Pierre Lartigue - Michel Périn	Citroën	(Italy) Fabrizio Meoni	KTM
1998	(France) Jean-Louis Schlesser - Philippe Monnet	Buggy Schlesser	(France) Richard Sainct	KTM
1999	(France) Jean-Louis Schlesser - Philippe Monnet	Buggy Schlesser	(France) Richard Sainct	BMW
2000	(France) Jean-Louis Schlesser - Henri Magne	Buggy Schlesser	(Italy) Fabrizio Meoni	KTM
2001	(France) Bruno Saby - Thierry Delli Zotti	Ford Protruck	(Italy) Fabrizio Meoni	KTM
2002	(France) Stéphane Peterhansel - Jean-Paul Cottret	Mitsubishi	(Spain) Nani Roma	KTM
2003	(France) Jean-Louis Schlesser - Jean-Marie Lurquin	Buggy Schlesser	(Italy) Fabrizio Meoni	KTM
2004	(France) Stéphane Peterhansel - Jean-Paul Cottret	Mitsubishi	(France) Cyril Despres	KTM
2005	(France) Luc Alphand - Gilles Picard	Mitsubishi	(France) Cyril Despres	KTM
2006	(France) Stéphane Peterhansel - Jean-Paul Cottret	Mitsubishi	(Spain) Isidre Esteve	KTM
2007	(France) Jean-Louis Schlesser - Arnaud Debron	Buggy Schlesser	(Spain) Marc Coma	KTM
2008	(France) Dominique Housieaux - Jean-Michel Polato	Buggy Schlesser	(France) Olivier Pain	Yamaha
2009	(Argentina) Orlando Terranova - Filip Palmeiro	BMW X-Raid	(France) Cyril Despres	KTM
2010	(France) Jean-Louis Schlesser - Konstantin Zhiltsov	Buggy Schlesser	(Chile) Chaleco López	Aprilia
2011	(Russia) Leonid Novitskiy - Andreas Schulz	BMW X-Raid	(Portugal) Hélder Rodrigues	Yamaha
