= 1994 Paris–Dakar Rally =

Off-road motorsport event in Europe and Africa

1994 Dakar Rally

Seasons
- ← 1993 1995 →

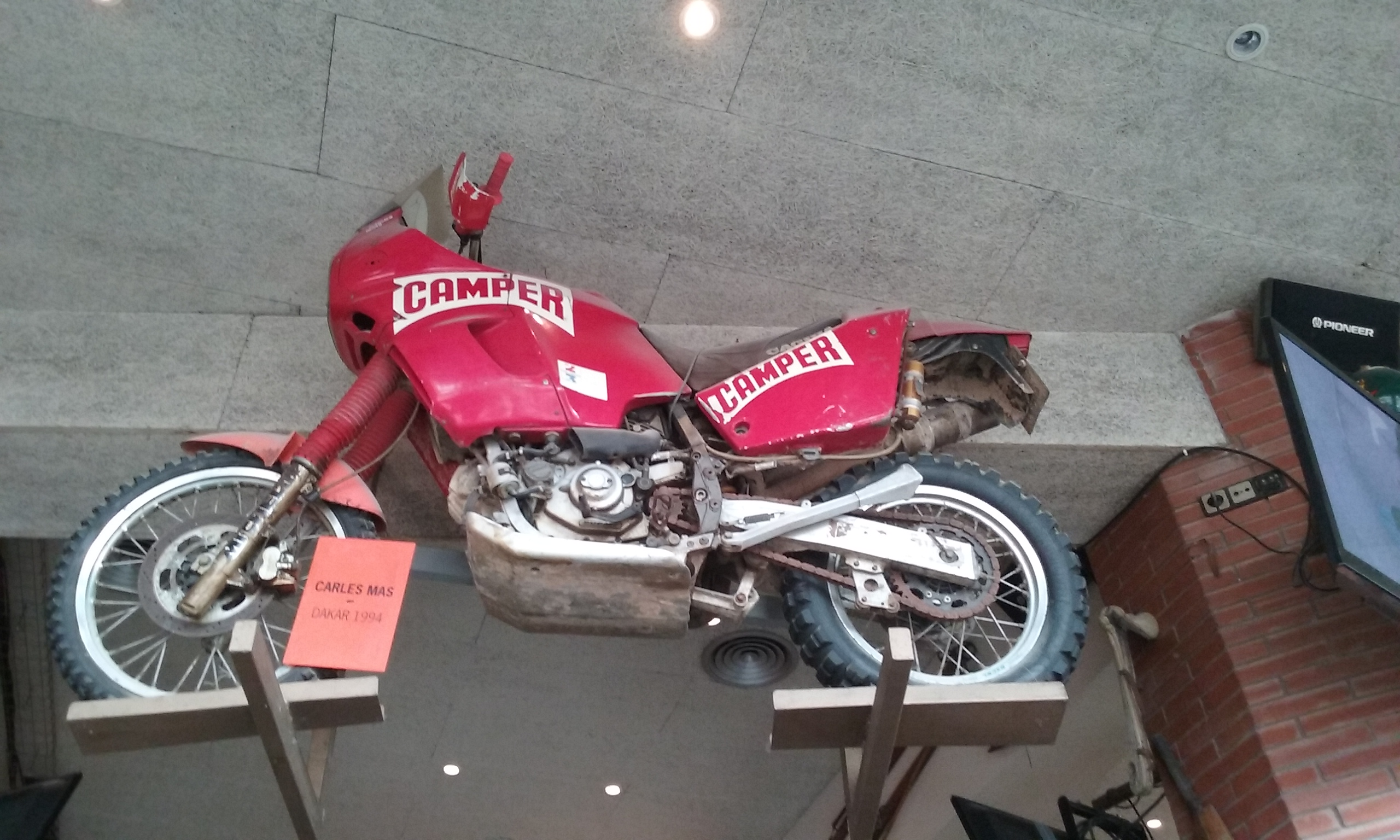
1994 Paris–Dakar Rally

The 1994 Paris–Dakar–Paris Rally was the 16th running of the Dakar Rally event. The route was from Paris to Dakar (via Bordeaux and Agadir) and back to Paris (via Ouarzazate and Motril). it was the first Dakar Rally organized by Amaury Sport Organisation. Fenouil (Jean-Claude Morellet) designed the route.

Pierre Lartigue won the rally while Edi Orioli won his third motorcycle title. Karel Loprais won the truck title in a Tatra 815.
