= Pierre Lartigue =

French rally driver

- Born: 22 October 1948 (age 78) France
- Former teams: Citroën
- Championships: 1994 Dakar Rally (cars); 1995 Dakar Rally (cars); 1996 Dakar Rally (cars)

Pierre Lartigue (born 22 October 1948) is a former French racecar driver who won several international rally raid competitions, most notably the Rally Dakar three times and the FIA World Cup for Cross-Country Rallies four times. Lartigue was a factory driver at Mitsubishi from 1988 to 1991, and a Citroën factory driver from 1992 to 1997.

== Rally Dakar ==
He won 21 stages in the African rally raid.

Year	Car	Co-pilot	Rank	Stages
1982	Range Rover	(France) Patrick Destaillats	4th	1
1983	Range Rover	(France) Patrick Destaillats	3rd	1
1984	Lada Niva	(France) Jean-Charles Djaoui	DNF	1
1985	Lada Niva	(France) Bernard Giroux	DNF	
1986	Lada Niva	(France) Bernard Giroux	4th	
1987	Lada Niva	(France) Pierre Roy	DNF	
1988	Mitsubishi Pajero	(France) Bernard Maingret	DNF	1
1989	Mitsubishi Pajero	(France) Bernard Maingret	DNF	
1990	Mitsubishi Pajero	(France) Bernard Maingret	DNF	1
1991	Mitsubishi Pajero	(France) Patrick Destaillats	2nd	
1992	Citroën	(France) Patrick Destaillats	7th	1
1993	Citroën	(France) Michel Périn	2nd	1
1994	Citroën	(France) Michel Périn	1st	10
1995	Citroën	(France) Michel Périn	1st	3
1996	Citroën	(France) Michel Périn	1st	1
1998	Protruck	(France) Alain Guehennec	DNF	
2001	Protruck	(France) Alain Guehennec	DNF	

== Achievements ==
- FIA World Cup for Cross-Country Rallies (4): 1993, 1994, 1995, 1996.
- Rally Dakar (3): 1994, 1995, 1996.
- Rally of Tunisia (8): 1985, 1989, 1990, 1992, 1993, 1994, 1995, 1996.
- Rally Atlas (5): 1983, 1984, 1990, 1991, 1994.
- Rally Paris-Moscow-Beijing: 1992.
- Rally Algeria: 1985.
- Baja Aragón (4): 1985, 1993, 1995, 1997.
- Baja Italy (4): 1994, 1995, 1996, 1997.
- Baja Portugal 1000 (3): 1993, 1994, 1996.
