= Jean-Louis Schlesser =

French racing driver (born 1948)

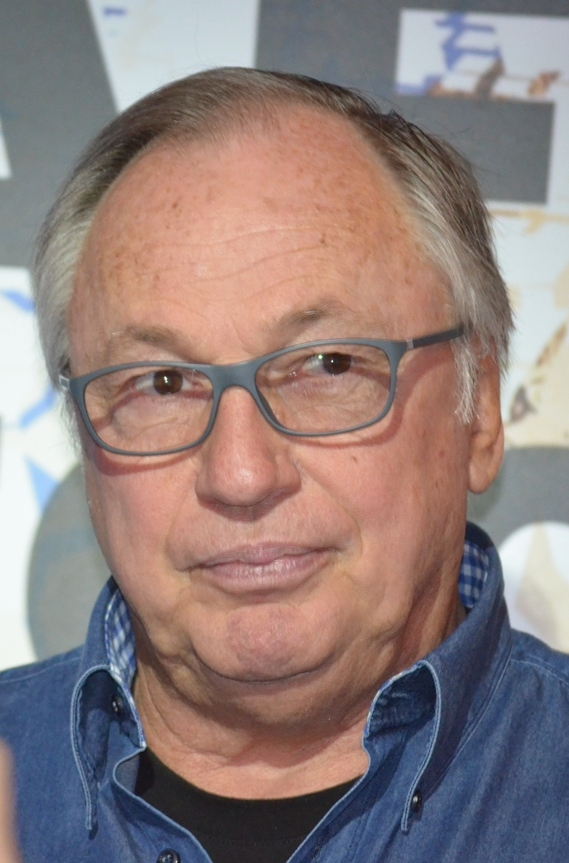
- Schlesser in 2013
- Born: 12 September 1948 (age 78); Nancy, Meurthe-et-Moselle, France

Formula One World Championship career
- Nationality: (France) French
- Active years: 1983, 1988
- Team(s): RAM Racing, Williams
- Entries: 2 (1 start)
- Championships: 0
- Wins: 0
- Podiums: 0
- Career points: 0
- Pole positions: 0
- Fastest laps: 0
- First entry: 1983 French Grand Prix
- Last entry: 1988 Italian Grand Prix

Jean-Louis Schlesser (born 12 September 1948) is a French former racing driver who has competed in both circuit racing and cross-country rallying, winning the World Sportscar driver's Championship in 1989 and 1990 while driving for Sauber-Mercedes. He is the nephew of Jo Schlesser, a former Formula One driver. Jean-Louis entered two Formula One races five years apart.

== Early career ==
Schlesser grew up in Morocco before returning to France to study and to complete military service. He began racing in the early 1970s after enrolling at the racing school at Le Mans, starting with numerous rally events. In 1976, he entered Formula Three, alternating between the French and European series for the next six years, and sharing the 1978 French championship with Alain Prost. In 1977, he began racing sports cars, and in 1981, he attempted the Le Mans 24 Hours for the first time, placing second with Philippe Streiff and Jacky Haran. He also began racing touring cars in 1980, competing in the French Supertouring Championship. In 1982, he moved from Formula Three to Formula Two, but it was not a success. Nonetheless, he moved into Formula One in 1983, while continuing to race sports cars and touring cars.

== Formula One ==
Schlesser was working as a test driver for Williams when he gained his first taste of Formula One (F1) in early 1983 when he bought a drive in the RAM team's March-RAM 01-Cosworth. His first race was the non-championship Race of Champions at Brands Hatch, where he started last of the 13 entrants and finished sixth. A week later, at the French Grand Prix at Paul Ricard, he was the slowest of the 29 cars in qualifying and thus failed to qualify. He did not take part in another F1 race for five years, though he continued to test for Williams, and was active in sports car racing.

=== 1988 Italian Grand Prix ===
In 1988, Williams called upon Schlesser to deputise for an unwell Nigel Mansell at the Italian Grand Prix at Monza. With 26 of the 31 cars allowed to start, Schlesser qualified 22nd, and thus made his Grand Prix debut the day before his 40th birthday.

In the race, Schlesser worked his way up to 11th, while Ayrton Senna led from pole position in his McLaren. In the closing stages, the Ferraris of Gerhard Berger and Michele Alboreto started to catch Senna, and were only a few seconds behind at the start of lap 49, with three laps remaining. At that point, Senna came up to lap Schlesser for the second time. Going into the tight Rettifilo chicane at the end of the start-finish straight, Schlesser went wide, expecting Senna to pass on the inside, and in the process locked his brakes. Wishing to keep his car on the track, Schlesser turned inside, and his left front wheel hit Senna's right rear. With the rear suspension broken, the McLaren spun and beached itself on a kerb, leaving the Ferraris to secure a one-two finish on home soil, less than a month after Enzo Ferrari's death. The collision also prevented the McLaren team from winning all 16 races of the 1988 season, as Alain Prost had retired fifteen laps earlier.

Afterwards, Schlesser said that he did not think the collision was his fault. Nonetheless, he made a tearful apology to Senna.

Twenty-five years later, at the 2013 Monaco Grand Prix, McLaren chairman Ron Dennis was reintroduced to Schlesser. Dennis said, "This is the man who ruined my life and our perfect record back in 1988." Schlesser said that "what happened that day at Monza kept you hungry."

== Touring car and sports car racing ==
The mid-1980s saw Schlesser perform in touring cars and sports cars, winning the French Touring Car Championship in 1985 with a TWR Rover Vitesse, as well as driving the works TWR Jaguars in the World Sportscar Championship. In 1986, he raced in the British Touring Car Championship, again in a TWR Rover Vitesse.

In 1988, Schlesser joined the Sauber-Mercedes squad full-time, winning the German Supercup and finishing the World Sportscar Championship in second place, (behind Martin Brundle). before winning the WSC title in 1989 and 1990, on this occasion sharing the title with co-driver Mauro Baldi. His last season in WSC was 1991 during which he raced alongside Michael Schumacher with Sauber-Mercedes. He also won the "Classic Masters" title at the 1994 Race of Champions.

== Off-road racing ==
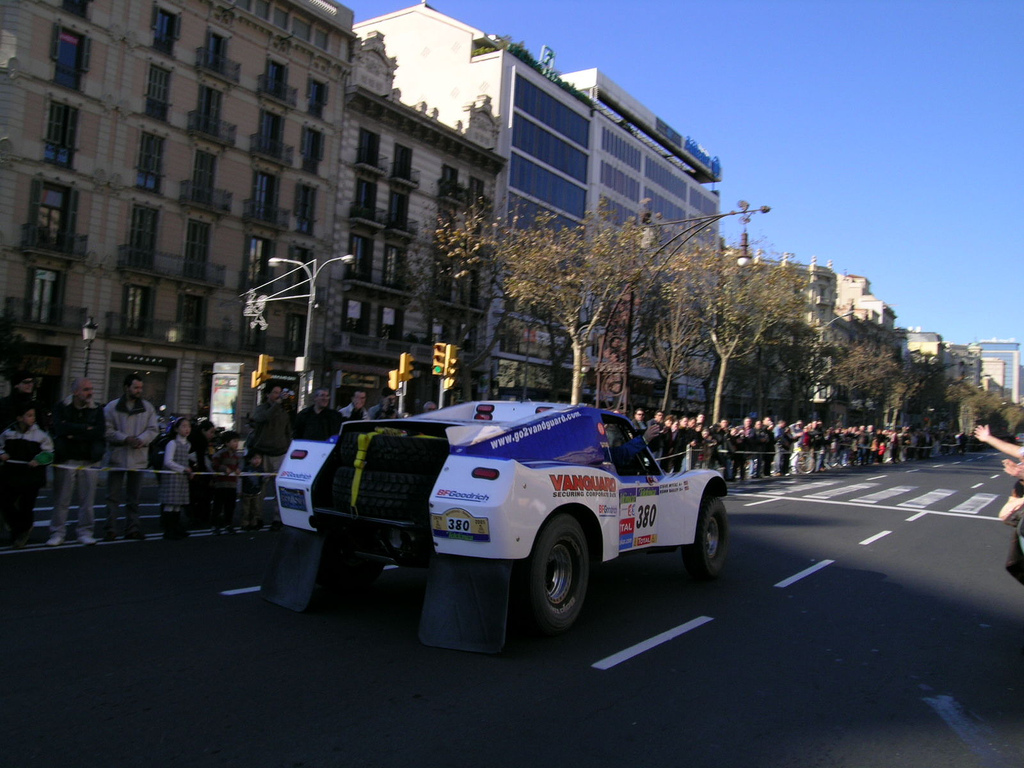
Schlesser Buggy, Rally Paris-Dakar, 2005.

After a first outing in 1984, Schlesser began to compete regularly in the Paris-Dakar Rally in 1989. In 1992, he began to build his own dune buggies to compete in the Dakar and other desert marathons and European bajas. His first buggy, the Porsche-powered Schlesser Original, debuted in 1992 in the Baja Portugal 1000, which Schlesser won outright, beating the works Citroën cars with a two-wheel-drive vehicle and without a navigator by his side.

Schlesser went on to several 2WD class and overall wins the following years, before taking the overall victory in the 1999 and 2000 editions of the Dakar (respectively, Granada-Dakar and Paris-Dakar-Cairo). In the 2001 Dakar, he was near victory but penalised one hour for unsportsmanlike conduct after illegally blocking his closest competitor both at the start and during the penultimate stage.

Returning to the podium for 2004 Dakar Rally with third overall, and once again in 2007, beating many factory efforts and winning stages, Schlesser and his team continued to compete in the event until 2008 Dakar Rally. That year, the rally raid was cancelled due to concerns over a possible terrorist attack. The outfit had three cars entered but did not return for the 2009 event.

Schlesser also won the FIA Cross Country Rally World Cup from 1998 to 2002 and the 2 WD FIA Cross Country Rally World Cup several times. Schlesser won every edition of the Africa Eco Race from its establishment in 2009 to 2014.

== Racing record ==
=== Complete World Sportscar Championship results ===
(key) (Races in bold indicate pole position; races in italics indicate fastest lap)

Year	Entrant	Class	Chassis	Engine	1	2	3	4	5	6	7	8	9	10	11	12	13	14	15	Pos.	Pts
1977	KWS-Freizeit-Racing-Team 77	Div. 1	Ford Escort	Ford 2.0 L4	DAY	MUG	SIL	NÜR; Ret	GLN	MOS	BRH	HOC	VAL							(Note: In 1976 and 1977 the World Championship was divided into two series that ran simultaneously but separately: The World Sportscar Championship and the World Championship for Makes.)	
1979	Jacques Guérin	GT +2.0	Porsche 911SC	Porsche 3.0 F6	DAY	MUG	DIJ; 15	SIL; 7	NÜR	PER	GLN									(Note: No drivers' Championship.)	
1979	Gerard Bleynie	GT +2.0	Porsche 911SC	Porsche 3.0 F6								BRH; 13	VAL							(Note: No drivers' Championship.)	
1980	Jacques Guérin	GT +2.0	Porsche 934	Porsche 3.0 F6t	DAY	BRH; 16	MUG; 9	MNZ	SIL	NÜR	LMS	GLN	MOS	VAL	DIJ						
1981	Jean Rondeau	GTP 3.0	Rondeau M379	Ford Cosworth DFV 3.0 V8	DAY	SEB	MUG	MNZ	RSD	SIL	NÜR	LMS; 2	PER	DAY	GLN					112th	20
1981	KWS Motorsport	serT+2.5	Ford Capri	Ford 3.0 V8												SPA; Ret	MOS	ROA	BRH	112th	20
1982	BASF Cassetten Team GS Sport	C	Sauber SHS C6	Cosworth DFL 4.0 V8	MNZ	SIL	NÜR	LMS; Ret	SPA	MUG	FUJ	BRH								NC	0
1983	John Fitzpatrick Racing	C	Porsche 956	Porsche Type 935 2.6 F6t	MNZ	SIL	NÜR	LMS; 10	SPA	FUJ	KYA									93rd	1
1984	New-Man Joest Racing	C1	Porsche 956	Porsche Type 935 2.6 F6t	MNZ	SIL	LMS; Ret	NÜR	BRH	MOS	SPA	IMO	FUJ	KYA	SAN					NC	0
1985	John Fitzpatrick Racing	C1	Porsche 962C	Porsche Type 935 2.6 F6t	MUG	MNZ	SIL	LMS; DNQ	HOC											NC	0
1985	TWR Jaguar	C1	Jaguar XJR-6	Jaguar 6.2 V12						MOS; 3	SPA; Ret	BRH; Ret	FUJ	SHA						NC	0
1986	TWR Jaguar	C1	Jaguar XJR-6	Jaguar 6.5 V12	MNZ; Ret	SIL; 7		NOR; 17	BRH; 4	JER; Ret	NÜR; Ret	SPA; 5	FUJ; 17							20th	22
1986	TWR Jaguar	C1	Jaguar XJR-6	Jaguar 6.0 V12			LMS; Ret													20th	22
1987	Kouros Racing	C1	Sauber C9	Mercedes-Benz M117 5.0 V8t	JAR	JER	MNZ	SIL	LMS	NOR	BRH	NÜR	SPA; 7	FUJ						47th	4
1988	Team Sauber Mercedes	C1	Sauber C9	Mercedes-Benz M117 5.0 V8t	**JER**; 1	**JAR**; 2	**MNZ**; 2	**SIL**; 2	LMS	**BRN**; 1	BRH; 3	NÜR; 1	SPA; 3	FUJ; 5	**SAN**; 1					2nd	208 (259)
1989	Team Sauber Mercedes	C1	Sauber C9	Mercedes-Benz M119 5.0 V8t	SUZ; 1	**DIJ**; 2	JAR; 1	BRH; 3	NÜR; 1	DON; 1	SPA; Ret	MEX; 1								1st	115 (127)
1990	Team Sauber Mercedes	C	Mercedes-Benz C9	Mercedes-Benz M119 5.0 V8t	SUZ; 1															1st	49.5
1990	Team Sauber Mercedes	C	Mercedes-Benz C11	Mercedes-Benz M119 5.0 V8t		MNZ; 1	**SIL**; Ret	SPA; 8	**DIJ**; 1	**NÜR**; 1	DON; 1	**CGV**; 1	MEX; DSQ							1st	49.5
1991	Team Sauber Mercedes	C2	Mercedes-Benz C11	Mercedes-Benz M119 5.0 V8t	SUZ; 2	MNZ; 3	SIL; 4	LMS; Ret												7th	45
1991	Team Sauber Mercedes	C1	Mercedes-Benz C291	Mercedes-Benz M291 3.5 F12					NÜR; Ret	MAG; Ret	MEX; Ret	AUT; 5								7th	45

Footnotes

=== Complete 24 Hours of Le Mans results ===
Year	Team	Co-Drivers	Car	Class	Laps	Pos.	Class Pos.
1981	(France) Jean Rondeau	(France) Jacky Haran (France) Philippe Streiff	Rondeau M379-Ford Cosworth	GTP; 3.0	340	**2nd**	**1st**
1982	(Germany) BASF Cassetten Team GS Sport	(Germany) Hans-Joachim Stuck (Austria) Dieter Quester	Sauber SHS C6-Ford Cosworth	C	76	DNF	DNF
1983	(United States) Preston Henn T-Bird Swap Shop (United Kingdom) John Fitzpatrick Racing	(United States) Preston Henn (France) Claude Ballot-Léna	Porsche 956	C	327	10th	10th
1984	(Germany) New-Man Joest Racing	(Sweden) Stefan Johansson (Colombia) Mauricio De Narváez	Porsche 956	C1	170	DNF	DNF
1985	(United Kingdom) John Fitzpatrick Racing	(United Kingdom) Kenny Acheson (United Kingdom) Dudley Wood	Porsche 962C	C1	-	DNQ	DNQ
1986	(United Kingdom) Silk Cut Jaguar (United Kingdom) Tom Walkinshaw Racing	(United Kingdom) Derek Warwick (United States) Eddie Cheever	Jaguar XJR-6	C1	239	DNF	DNF
1989	(Germany) Team Sauber Mercedes	(France) Jean-Pierre Jabouille (France) Alain Cudini	Sauber C9-Mercedes	C1	378	5th	5th
1991	(Germany) Team Sauber Mercedes	(Germany) Jochen Mass (France) Alain Ferté	Mercedes-Benz C11	C2	319	DNF	DNF

=== Complete European Formula Two Championship results ===
(key) (Races in bold indicate pole position; races in italics indicate fastest lap)

Year	Entrant	Chassis	Engine	1	2	3	4	5	6	7	8	9	10	11	12	13	Pos.	Pts
1982	Maurer Motorsport	Maurer MM82	BMW	SIL	HOC	THR	NÜR	MUG; 14	VAL; Ret	PAU; 8	SPA; 7	HOC	DON; 8	MAN; 7	PER; 14	MIS; Ret	NC	0

=== Complete Formula One World Championship results ===
(key)

Year	Entrant	Chassis	Engine	1	2	3	4	5	6	7	8	9	10	11	12	13	14	15	16	WDC	Pts
1983	RAM Automotive Team March	RAM March 01	Ford Cosworth DFV 3.0 V8	BRA	USW	FRA; DNQ	SMR	MON	BEL	DET	CAN	GBR	GER	AUT	NED	ITA	EUR	RSA		NC	0
1988	Canon Williams Team	Williams FW12	Judd CV 3.5 V8	BRA	SMR	MON	MEX	CAN	DET	FRA	GBR	GER	HUN	BEL	ITA; 11	POR	ESP	JPN	AUS	NC	0

=== Complete British Saloon Car Championship results ===
(key) (Races in bold indicate pole position – 1973–1990 in class) (Races in italics indicate fastest lap – 1 point awarded ?–1989 in class)

Year	Team	Car	Class	1	2	3	4	5	6	7	8	9	DC	Pts	Class
1986	TWR – Herbie Clips	Rover Vitesse	A	SIL	THR	SIL	DON	**BRH** ovr:2 cls:2	SNE	BRH	DON	SIL	21st	7	8th

=== Complete Deutsche Tourenwagen Meisterschaft results ===
(key)

Year	Team	Car	1	2	3	4	5	6	7	8	9	10	11	12	13	14	15	16	17	18	19	20	21	22	23	24	Pos.	Pts
1988	AMG Motorenbau GmbH	Mercedes 190E 2.3-16	ZOL; 1	ZOL; 2	HOC; 1	HOC; 2	NÜR; 1	NÜR; 2	BRN; 1	BRN; 2	AVU; 1	AVU; 2	MFA; 1	MFA; 2	NÜR; 1	NÜR; 2	NOR; 1	NOR; 2	WUN; 1	WUN; 2	SAL; 1	SAL; 2	HUN; 1	HUN; 2	HOC; 1; 7	HOC; 2; 10	27th	21

== Filmography ==
- Taxi 2 (2000)

== See also ==
- Buggy Schlesser

Sporting positions
Preceded by Dany Snobeck	French Touring Car Champion; 1985	Succeeded by Xavier Lapeyre
Preceded by Martin Brundle	World Sportscar Champion; 1989–1990; With: Mauro Baldi (1990)	Succeeded by Teo Fabi
Preceded by Inaugural	Race of Champions; Classic Master; 1994	Succeeded by Marc Duez
Preceded by Jean-Pierre Fontenay	Dakar Rally; Car Winner; 1999–2000	Succeeded by Jutta Kleinschmidt
