= Aeolus S30 =

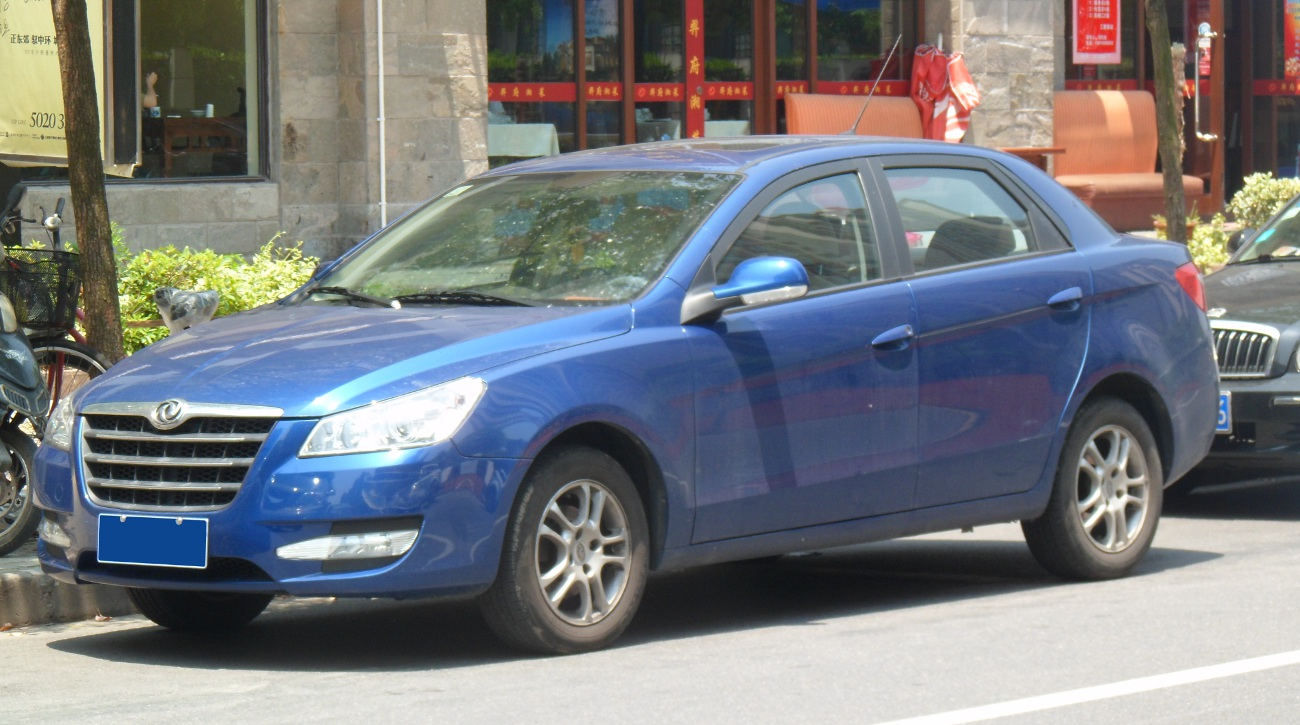

Overview
- Also called: Aeolus H30 (hatchback)
- Production: 2009–2017
- Assembly: China: Wuhan; Iran: Tehran (IKCO)
- Designer: Italdesign

Body and chassis
- Class: Compact car (C)
- Body style: 4-door sedan (S30); 5-door hatchback / Crossover Hatchback (H30 / H30 Cross)
- Layout: Front-engine, front-wheel-drive
- Related: Citroën Elysée; Citroën ZX; Citroën Fukang

Powertrain
- Engine: 1.5 L DFMA15 I4 (petrol); 1.6 L TU5 I4 (petrol)
- Electric motor: 89 kW (121.0 PS; 119.4 hp) Permanent magnet motor (S30 EV concept & S30 PHEV concept)
- Transmission: 5-speed manual (PSA); 4-speed automatic (Aisin)
- Hybrid drivetrain: PHEV (S30 PHEV concept)

Dimensions
- Wheelbase: 2,610 mm (102.8 in)
- Length: 4,526 mm (178.2 in) (S30); 4,268 mm (168.0 in) (H30); 4,336 mm (170.7 in) (H30 Cross)
- Width: 1,740 mm (68.5 in)
- Height: 1,465 mm (57.7 in) (S30); 1,482 mm (58.3 in) (H30); 1,528 mm (60.2 in) (H30 Cross)

Chronology
- Predecessor: Yunbao Fengshen 7200
- Successor: Aeolus A30; Aeolus Yixuan GS (for Aeolus H30 Cross)

The Aeolus S30 or previously the Dongfeng Fengshen S30 is a compact sedan produced by Dongfeng Motor Corporation under the Aeolus (Dongfeng Fengshen) sub-brand from 2009 to 2017. The 5-door hatchback version was called Aeolus H30.

== Overview ==
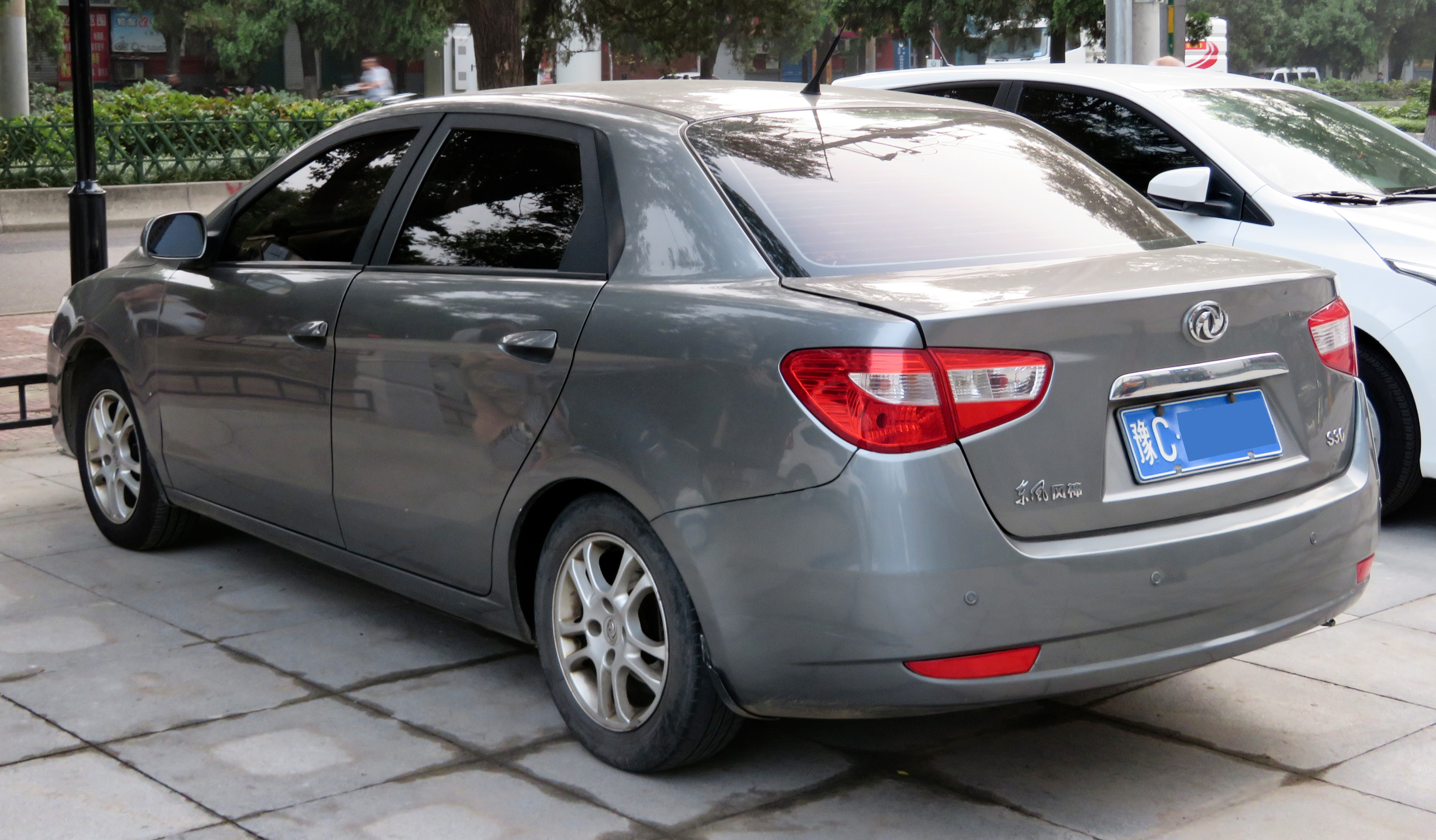
2012 Aeolus S30, rear

The development of a new Dongfeng brand sedan began in the mid-2000s by exploiting the synergy with the French group PSA which, thanks to Dongfeng, built numerous models for the local market in China. A first prototype called Dongfeng DFM7160 was built on the chassis of the Citroën Fukang (the Chinese version of the Citroën ZX) and was a three-volume sedan with front lights of the Peugeot 206 and rear lights of the Mercedes-Benz C-Class while the doors and cockpit were the same as the Citroën Elysée. However, this prototype remained a unique example as it was too cheap and technically outdated to enter the market and Dongfeng began working in 2007 on a new project based on PSA technologies. An agreement was also made with Italdesign for the style and engineering of the new car. In April 2009, the new Dongfeng Fengshen S30 officially debuted, the first car of the new Fengshen brand (translated into English language as Aeolus) intended to sell passenger vehicles (sedans and crossovers) of the Dongfeng group. The S30 used the platform of the Citroën ZX/Fukang but had a specific body design and a more modern interior. The mechanical scheme was the same as the Citroën models with front-wheel drive, MacPherson suspension at the front and interconnected wheels with a torsional axle at the rear, 105 horsepower 1.6 PSA four-cylinder TU5 engine. The gearbox was a 5-speed PSA manual or a 4-speed Aisin automatic. 4.56 meters long, it had a wheelbase of 2.61 meters. Production of the sedan version starts in July 2009 at the Wuhan plant.

The top level Automatic Navigation model was equipped with a navigation system with screen, five-spoke alloy wheels and a four-speed automatic transmission.

=== 2013 facelift ===
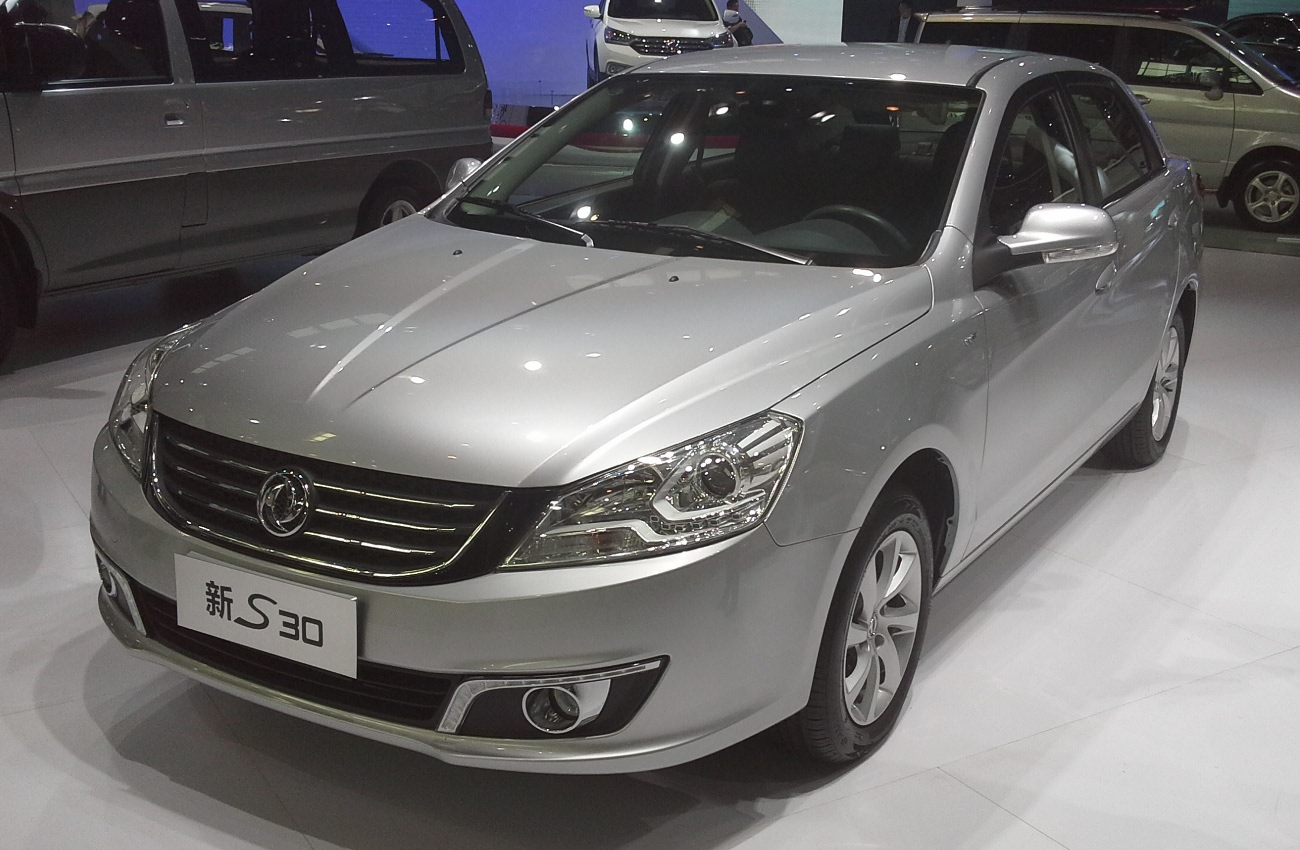
Aeolus S30 facelift

A facelift was revealed in March 2013, changing the front and rear DRG styling, with prices starting from 59,800 yuan and ending at 88,800 yuan.

== Aeolus S30 PHEV concept ==
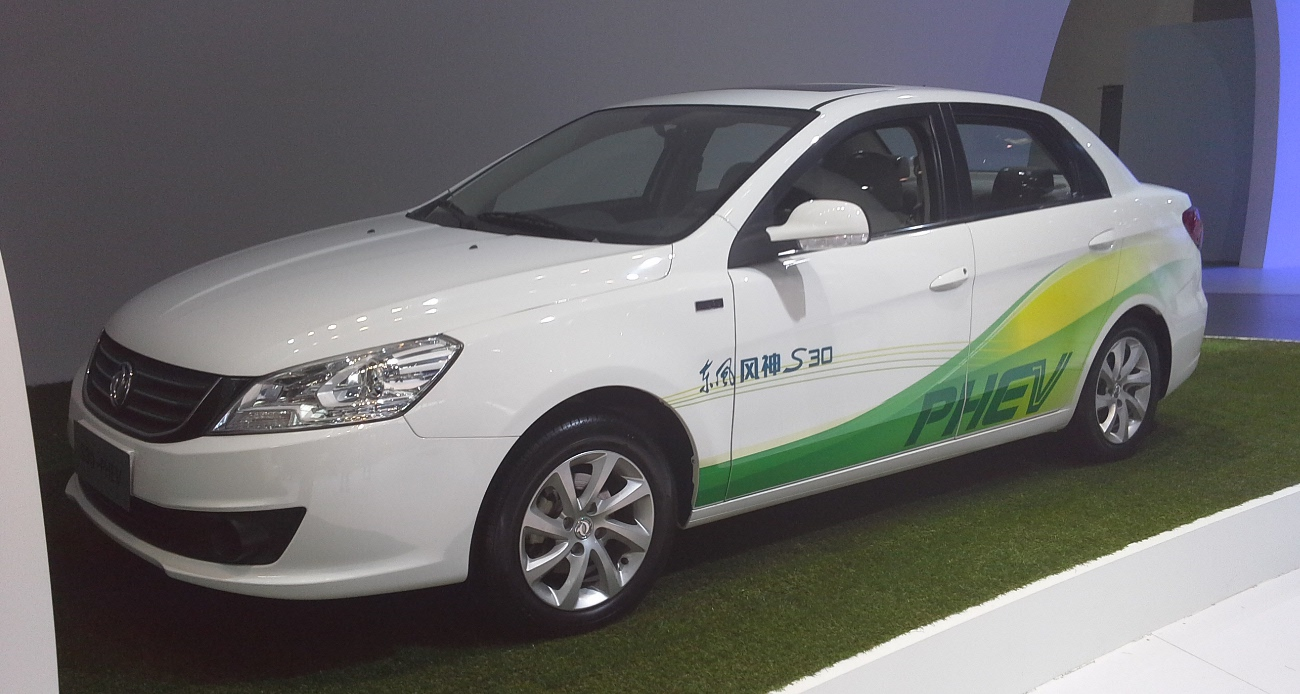
Aeolus S30 PHEV Concept

Dongfeng revealed the Aeolus S30 PHEV based on the facelifted Aeolus S30 sedan during the 2016 Beijing Auto Show in concept form, but was never intended for production.

== Aeolus H30 hatchback ==
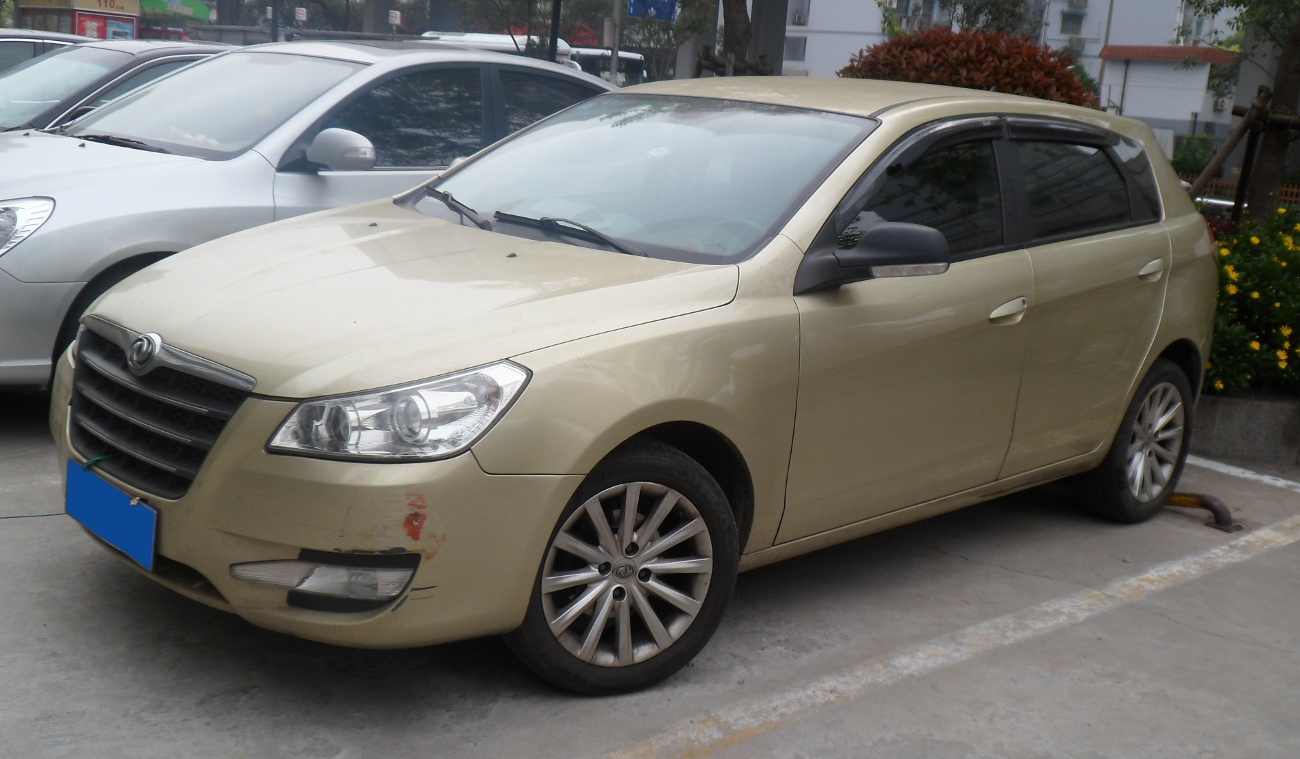
Aeolus H30

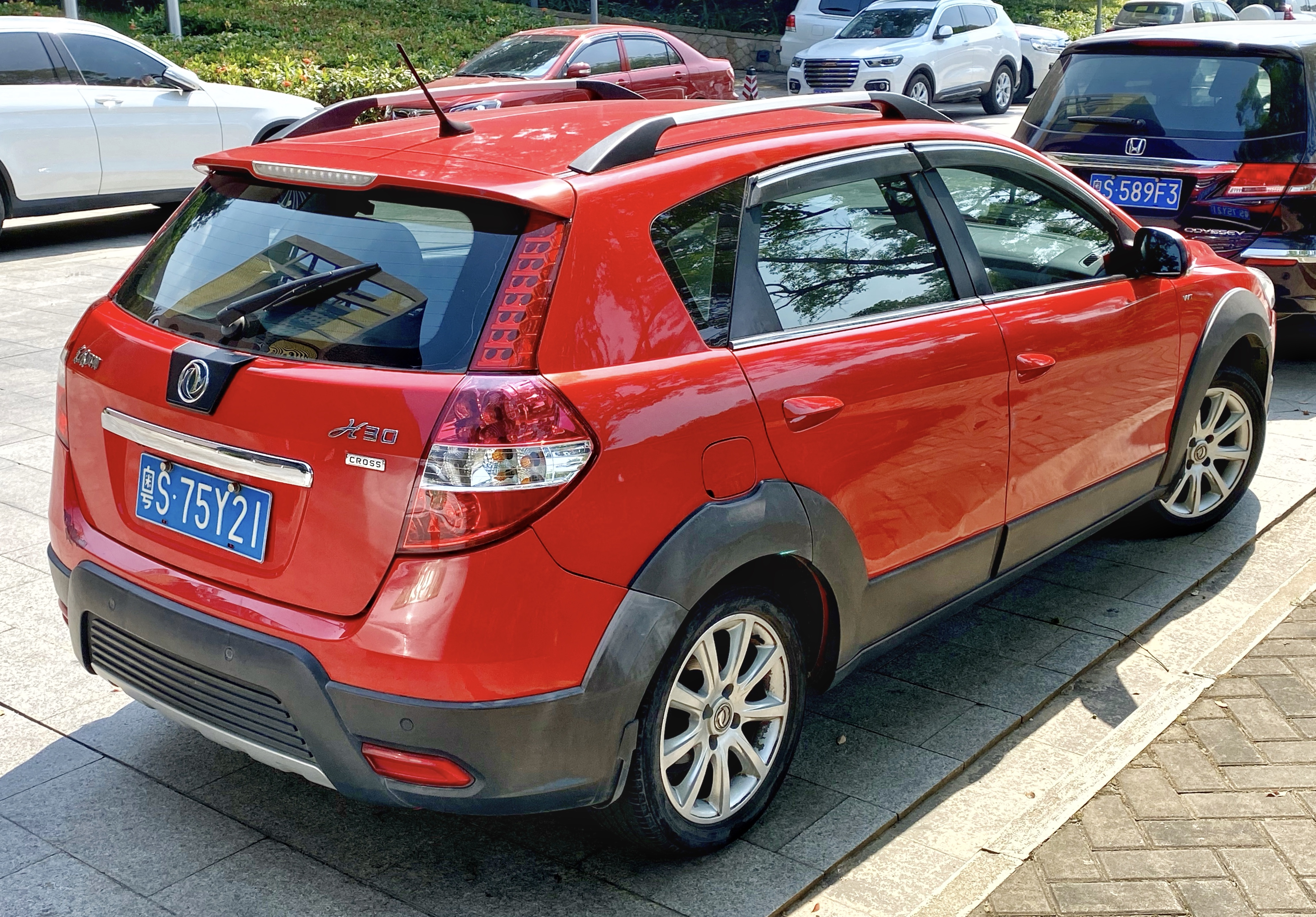
Aeolus H30 cross (rear)

The Aeolus H30 is essentially the hatchback version of the Aeolus S30 subcompact sedan, with prices starting from 69,800 yuan and ending at 93,800 yuan.

=== Aeolus H30 Cross ===
A version of the H30 featuring crossover accents variant the such as plastic cladding around the wheel arches and bumpers was introduced also at the 2010 Beijing Auto Show as the Aeolus H30 Cross, with prices starting from 86,800 yuan and ending at 97,800 yuan. A facelift was revealed in March 2013, discontinuing the regular H30 hatchback and changing the front DRG styling of the H30 Cross.
