= TU5 =

TU5 may refer to:

- Tupolev Tu-154, a Russian airliner (IATA aircraft type code)
- PSA TU engine#TU5, an automobile engine
