= Citroën Elysée =

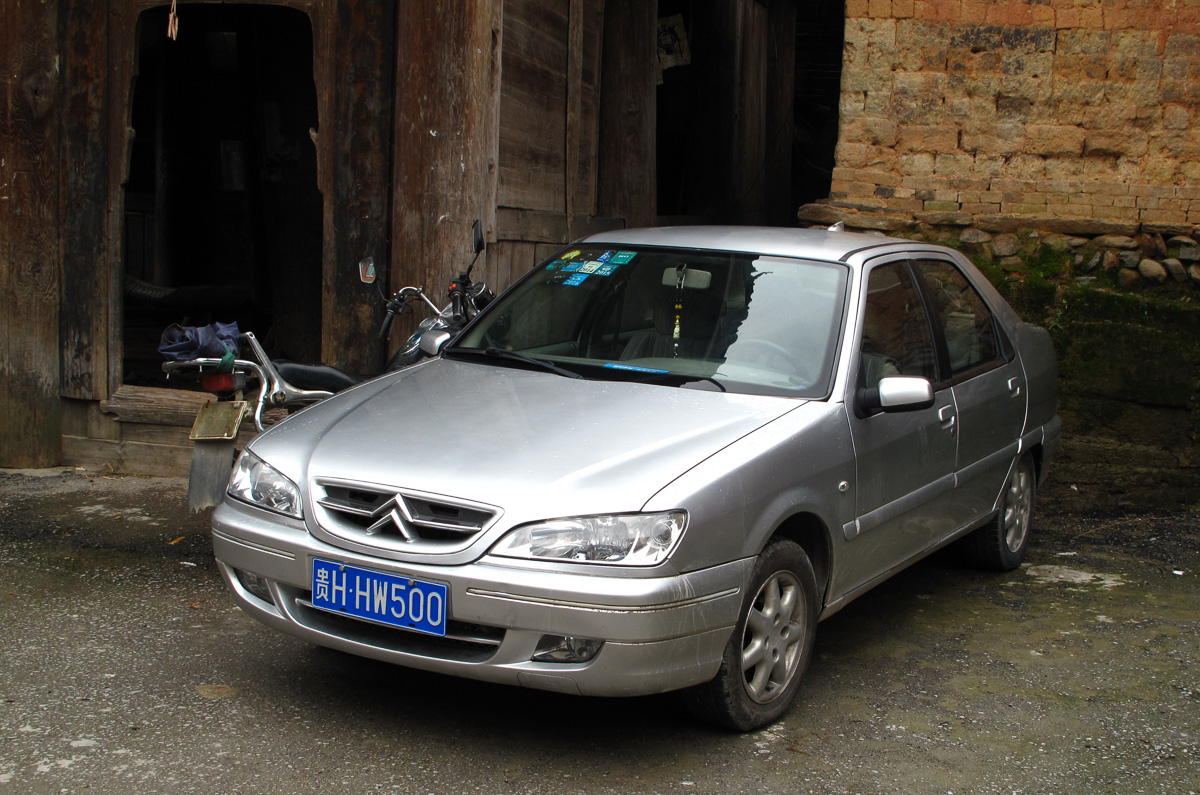

Overview
- Manufacturer: Citroën
- Also called: Citroën C-Elysée (facelift)
- Production: 2002–2013
- Assembly: China: Wuhan, Hubei

Body and chassis
- Class: Small family car (C)
- Body style: 4-door saloon
- Layout: FF layout
- Related: Citroën ZX; Citroën Fukang; Dongfeng Fengshen S30

Powertrain
- Engine: 1.6 L N6A 10XA3A PSA I4 (petrol)
- Transmission: 5-speed manual 4-speed automatic

Dimensions
- Wheelbase: 2,540 mm (100.0 in)
- Length: 4,305 mm (169.5 in) (2002–2007); 4,367 mm (171.9 in) (2008–2013)
- Width: 1,707 mm (67.2 in) (2002–2007); 1,708 mm (67.2 in) (2008–2013)
- Height: 1,413 mm (55.6 in)
- Curb weight: 1,125 kg (2,480 lb)–1,165 kg (2,568 lb)

Chronology
- Predecessor: Citroën Fukang
- Successor: Citroën C-Elysée; Citroën C4 hatchback (for hatchback)

The Citroën Élysée is a small family saloon car produced for the Chinese domestic market by the Dongfeng Peugeot-Citroën Automobile, a joint venture between the French PSA Group (Peugeot-Citroën) and the Chinese manufacturer Dongfeng Motor. Production commenced in June 2002.

== History ==
=== 2002–2008: Élysée ===
Citroën Elysée (rear view)

Introduced in 2002 with a 4-door sedan body, the car was nothing more than a profound restyling of the previous Citroën Fukang or the specific version for the Chinese market of the Citroën ZX produced by the joint venture between the PSA Group and the Chinese manufacturer Dongfeng Motor in the Wuhan plant. The Élysée, while maintaining the layout of the old car, introduced a totally new front with new headlights inherited from the second series Peugeot 306, a new grille and bumpers similar to those of the Saxo and new taillights made their debut at the rear. Inside, the change was more evident: the same dashboard as the Xsara debuts with a rounded and more modern style and the finish and overall quality of the car are greatly improved. The engine range consisted of the 1.4 four-cylinder 75 horsepower with 5-speed manual gearbox and the 1.6 four-cylinder delivering 88 and 105 horsepower with a 5-speed manual and a four-speed automatic gearbox. Shortly after the launch, the Élysée VIP was also introduced, a version with the wheelbase extended by 16 centimeters and a 4.50 meter long bodywork characterized by richer and more luxurious fittings with faux briar finishes and leather seats as well as external chrome along the car body. The VIP engine was the only 1.6 four-cylinder sixteen valve engine delivering 105 horsepower combined with a 4-speed automatic gearbox.

Citroën Elysée VIP (Long wheelbase)

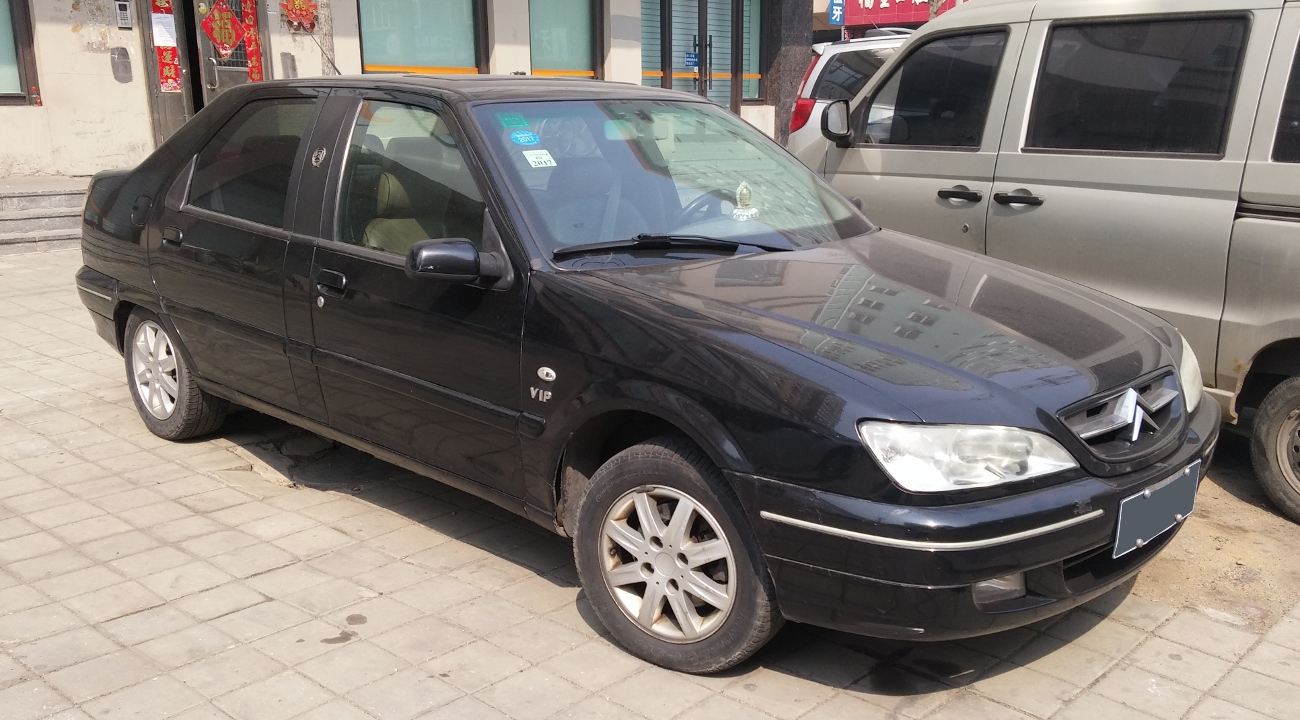

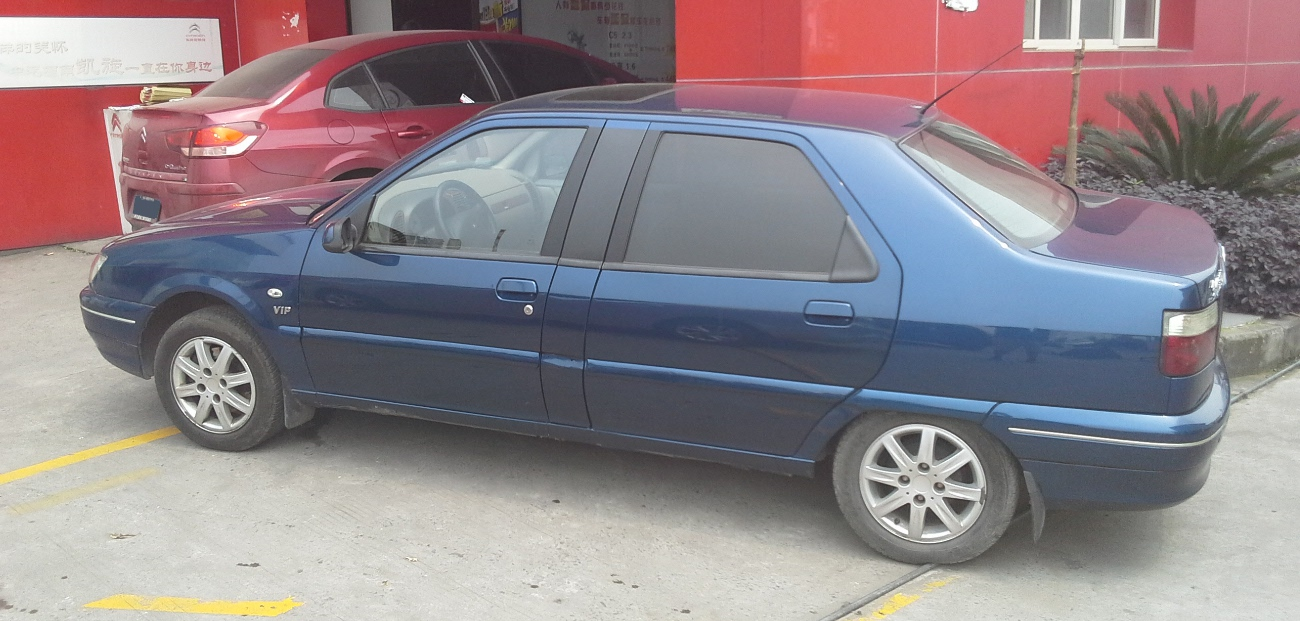

=== 2008: the C-Élysée debuts ===
On April 8, 2008, an updated version was presented at the Beijing Motor Show and there was a change of name to C-Élysée and at the same time the car underwent another restyling to bring it into line with the range of cars produced by Citroën for the Chinese market.; the "C" in the name was chosen to maintain consistency in the new names adopted by the manufacturer. The most evident aesthetic change was in the grille, now in line with the European Citroën, and in particular with the second generation of the Citroën C5, as it incorporated the emblem into the two large horizontal chromed bars that made up the grille itself. In total, 300 changes were made by Dongfeng technicians compared to the previous model. The new car was a step lower than the C-Triomphe based on the C4, and was equipped with the 109 HP 1.6 16v engine, as well as a decidedly more modern equipment than the previous Élysée, which included the latest generation ABS system, updated suspension and an audio system with USB socket. As for the transmission, there were two gearbox variants available: 5-speed manual or 4-speed automatic. Inside, the dashboard maintained the same setting as the previous one, but new seats with better padding were introduced. The VIP variant was also restyled. Starting from 2009, the C-Élysée was also offered with a hatchback two-volume bodywork, replacing the old Fukang: in this case the rear lights, while recalling in form those of a normal ZX or a normal Fukang a two volumes, were more rounded in the corners and were more modern in the graphics of the plastics.

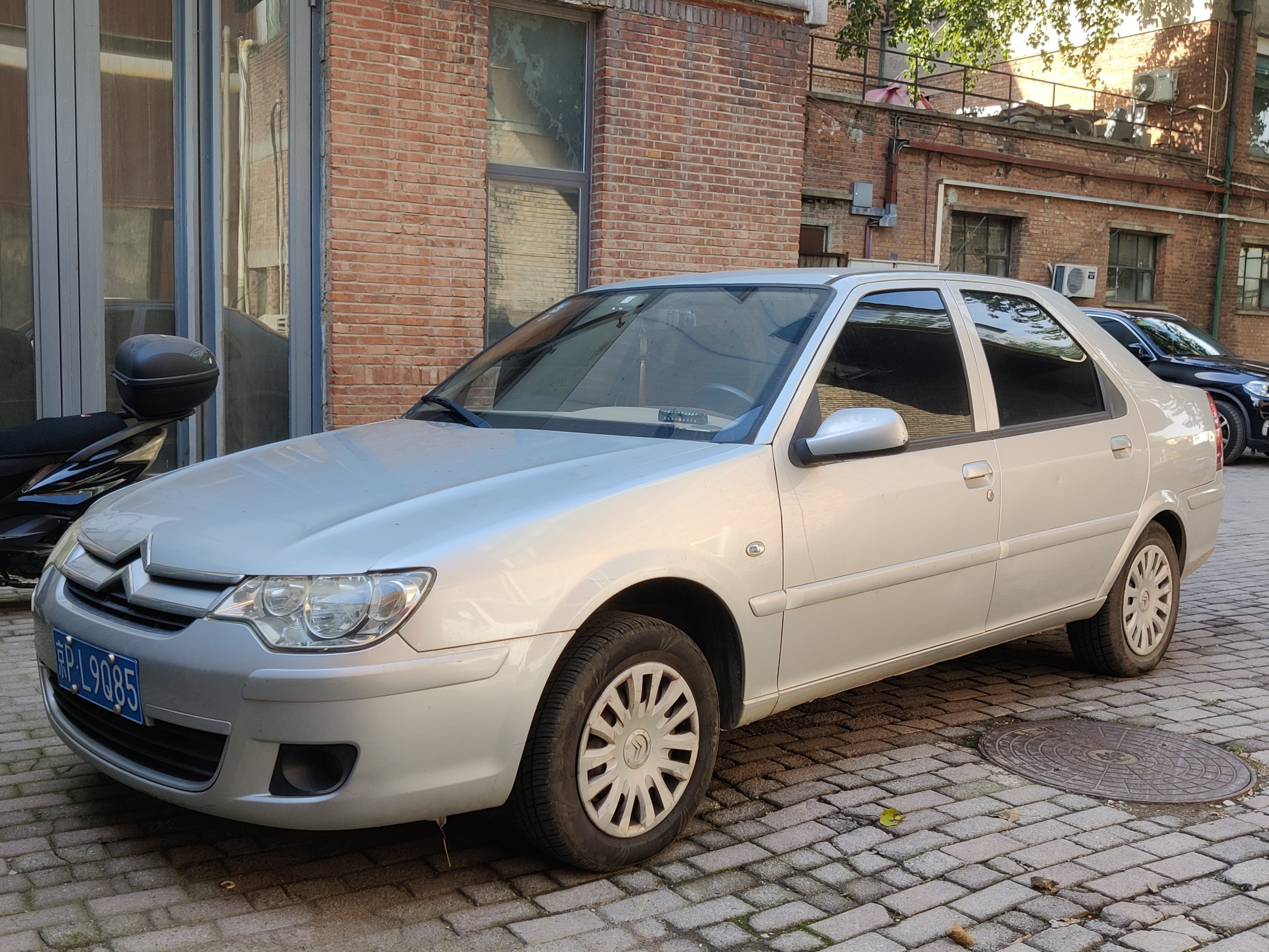
Citroën C-Élysée front (2008–2010)

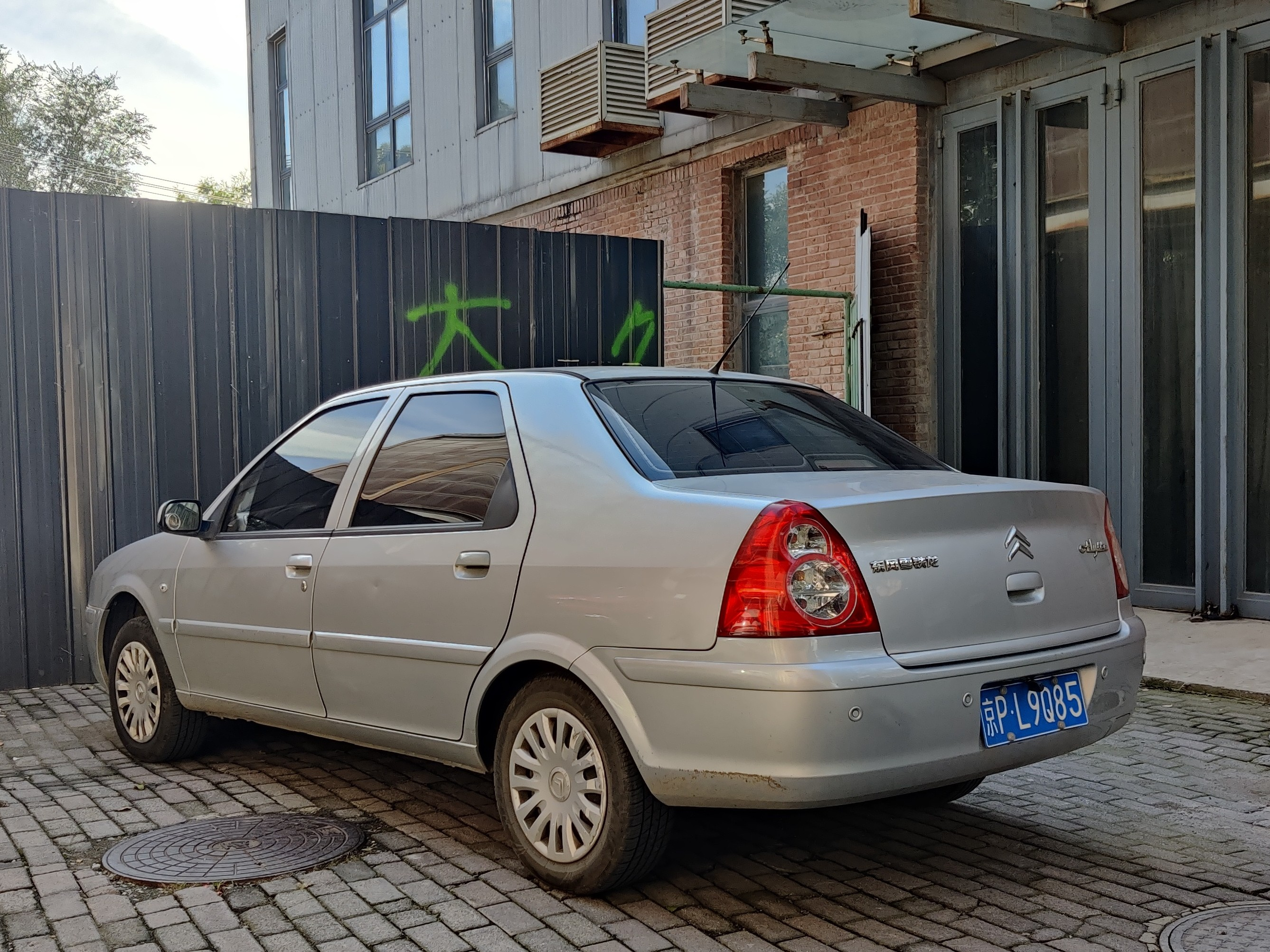
Citroën C-Élysée rear (2008–2010)
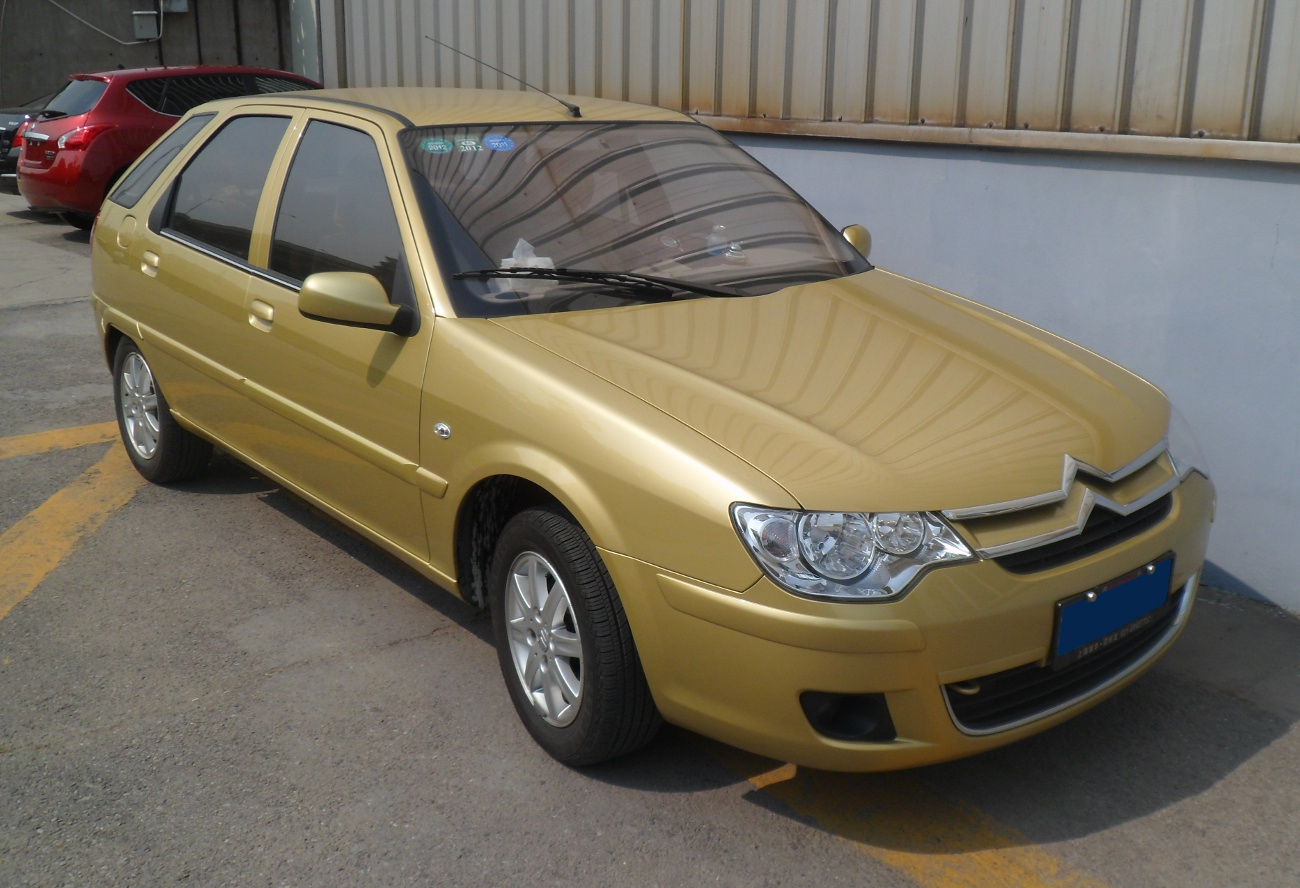
Citroën Élysée hatch (front)

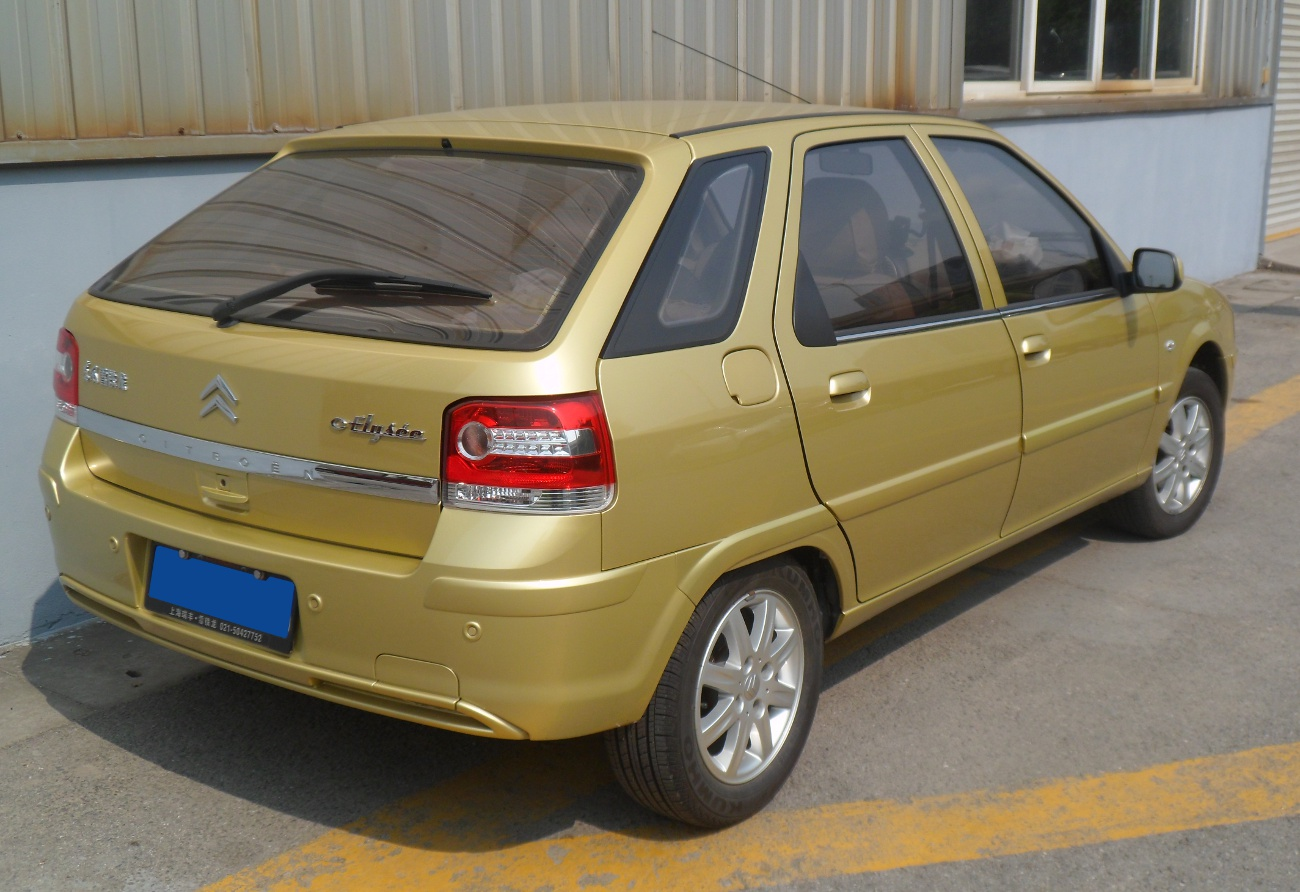
Citroën Élysée hatch (rear)

=== 2012: last update ===
In 2012, a final restyling of the car was presented which saw only the front bumpers and rear light clusters modified. The general line remains the same as the 2008 model. The 5-door and VIP models are out of production replaced by the locally assembled Citroën C4 5-door and sedan. Production of the first generation of C-Elysee ends in early 2013 when the parent company begins to produce the second generation of the car, completely new and the result of a global project.

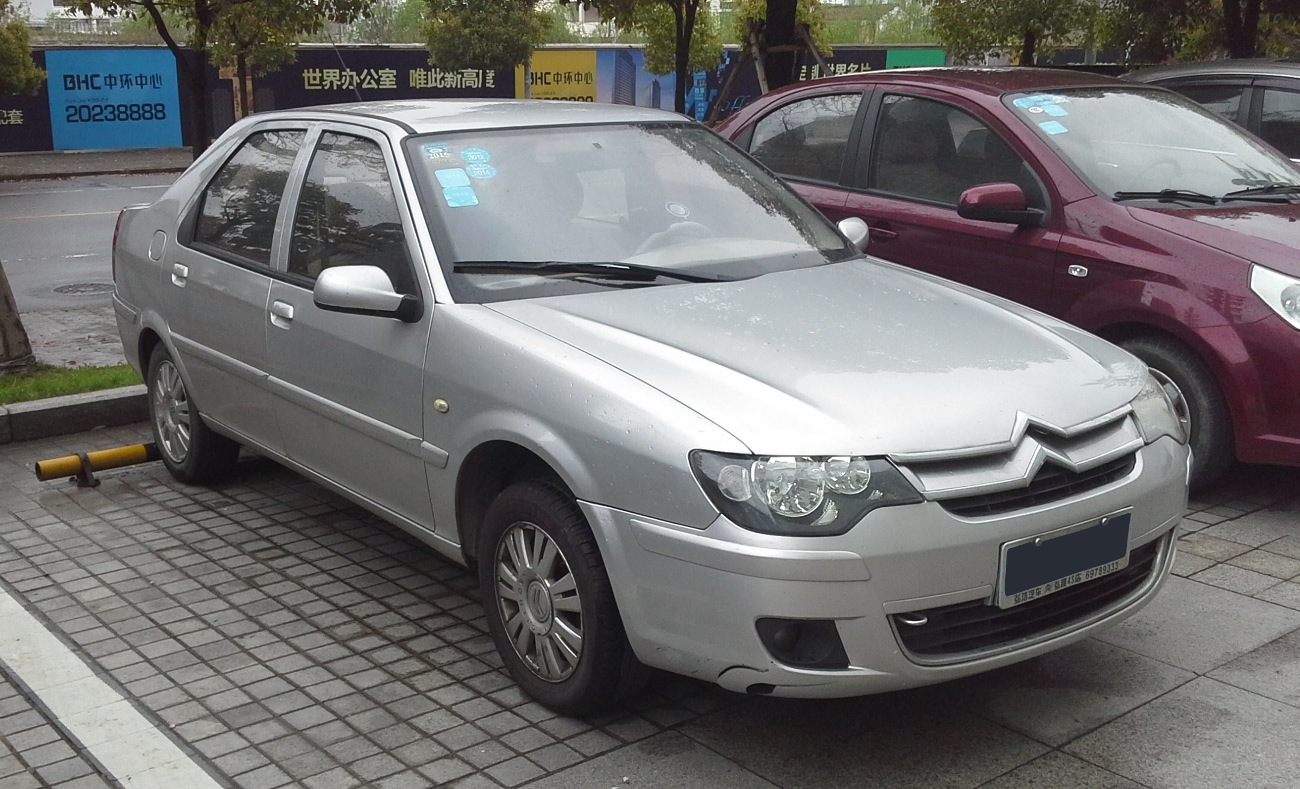
Citroën C-Élysée front (2011–2013)

== Specification ==
=== Design ===
The Élysée was designed in China and is derived from the Citroën ZX, with many parts (including the dashboard) taken from the Citroën Xsara and Citroën Saxo.

The car has a VTS sport version with only red colour.

=== Related vehicle ===
The platform and the engine of the Élysée/Fukang was used by Dongfeng Motor for the Dongfeng Fengshen S30

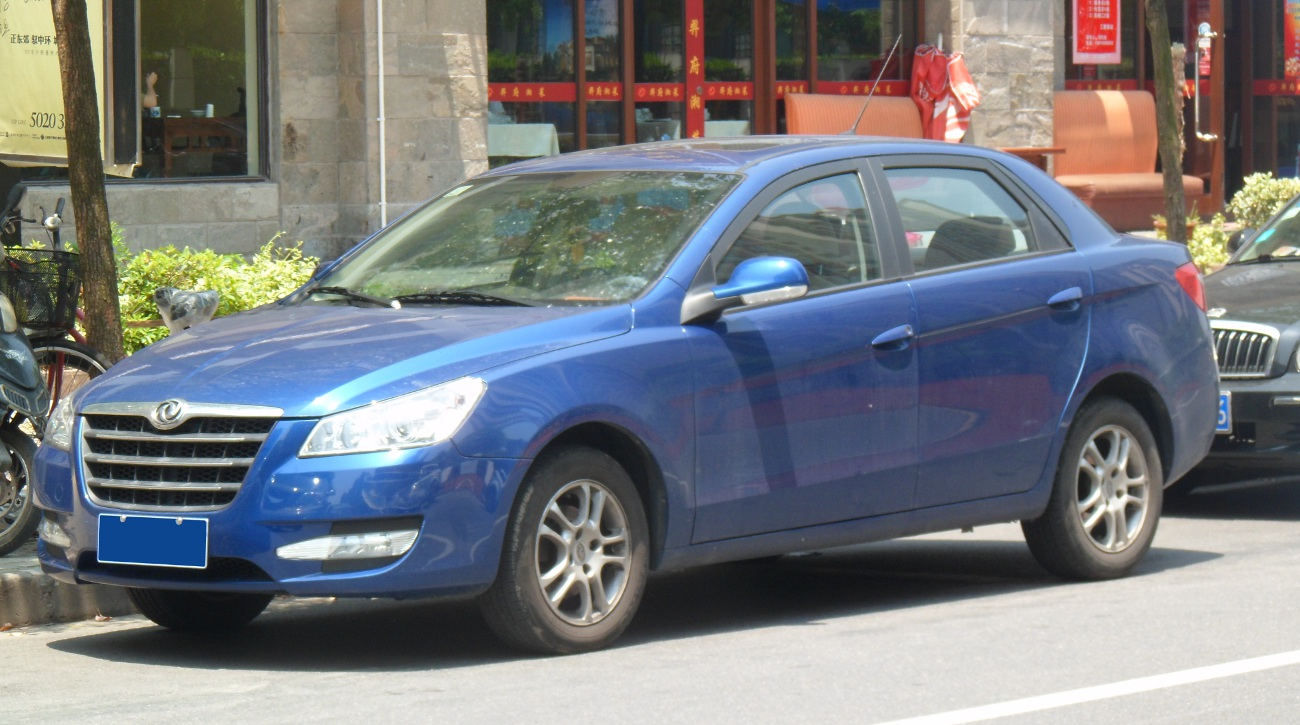
Dongfeng Fengshen S30

== Second generation (2012–present) ==
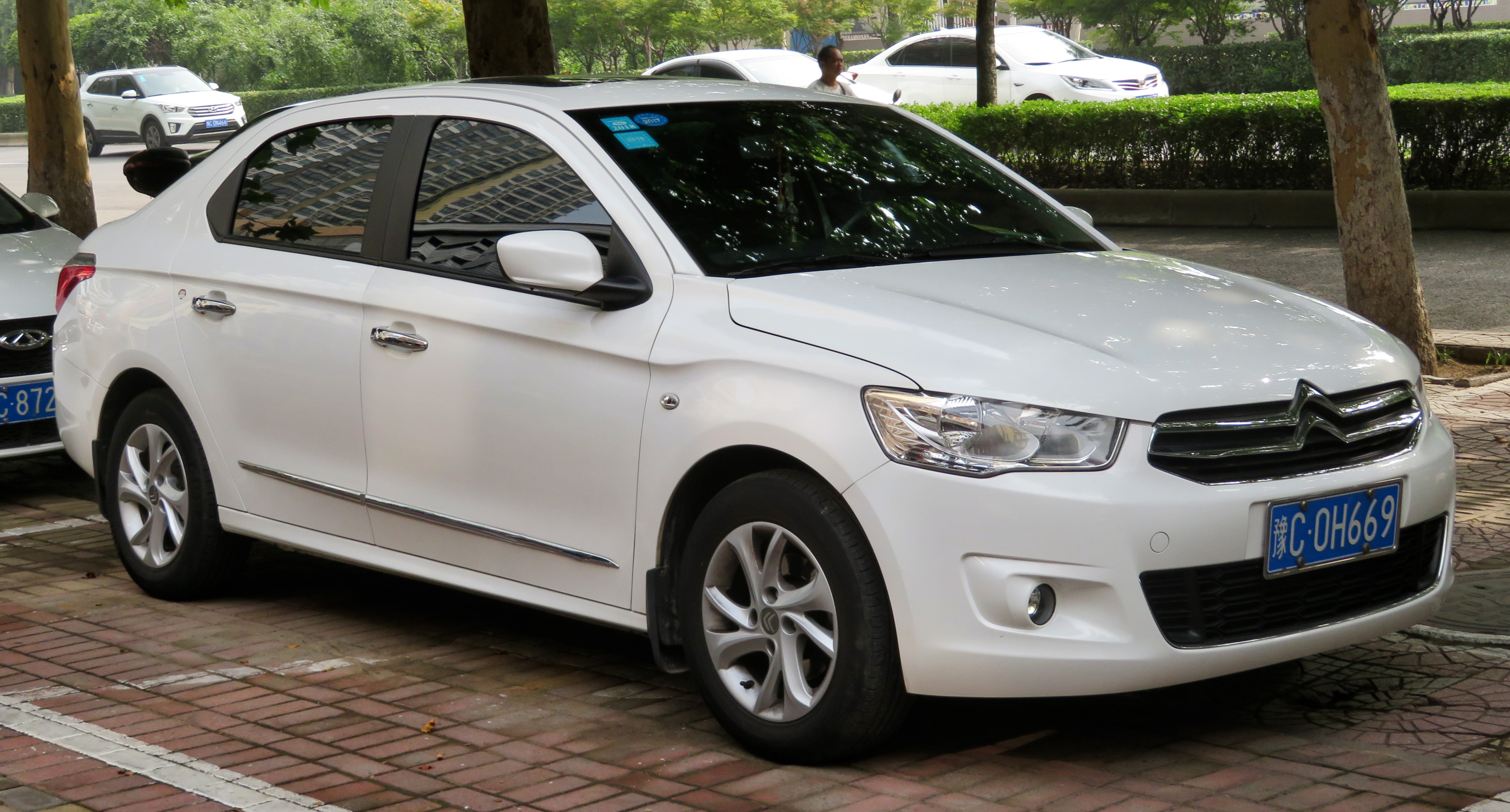
A 2016 Dongfeng-Citroën C-Elysée

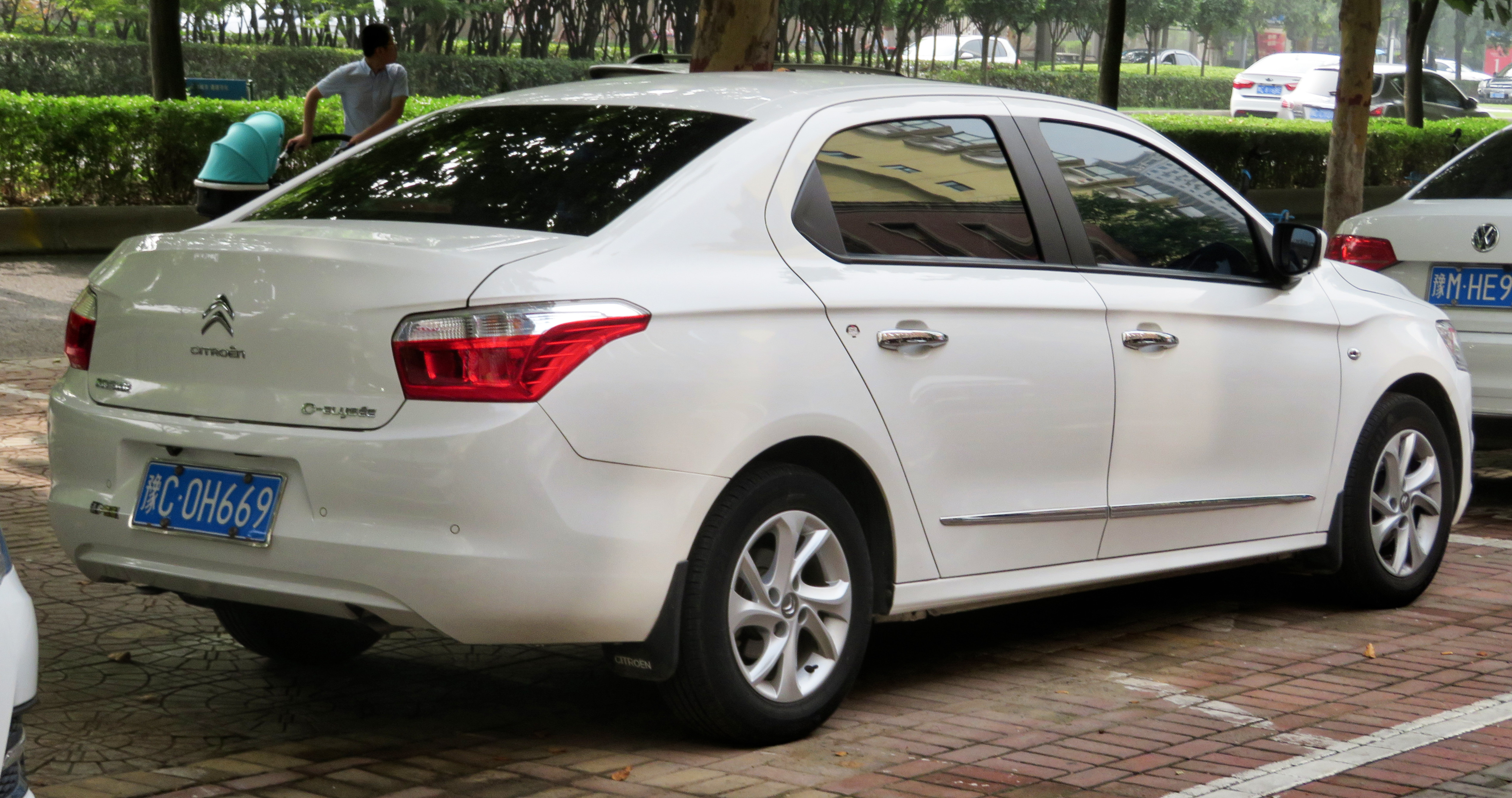
Citroën C-Élysée rear
