= Citroën C-Elysée =

French compact car

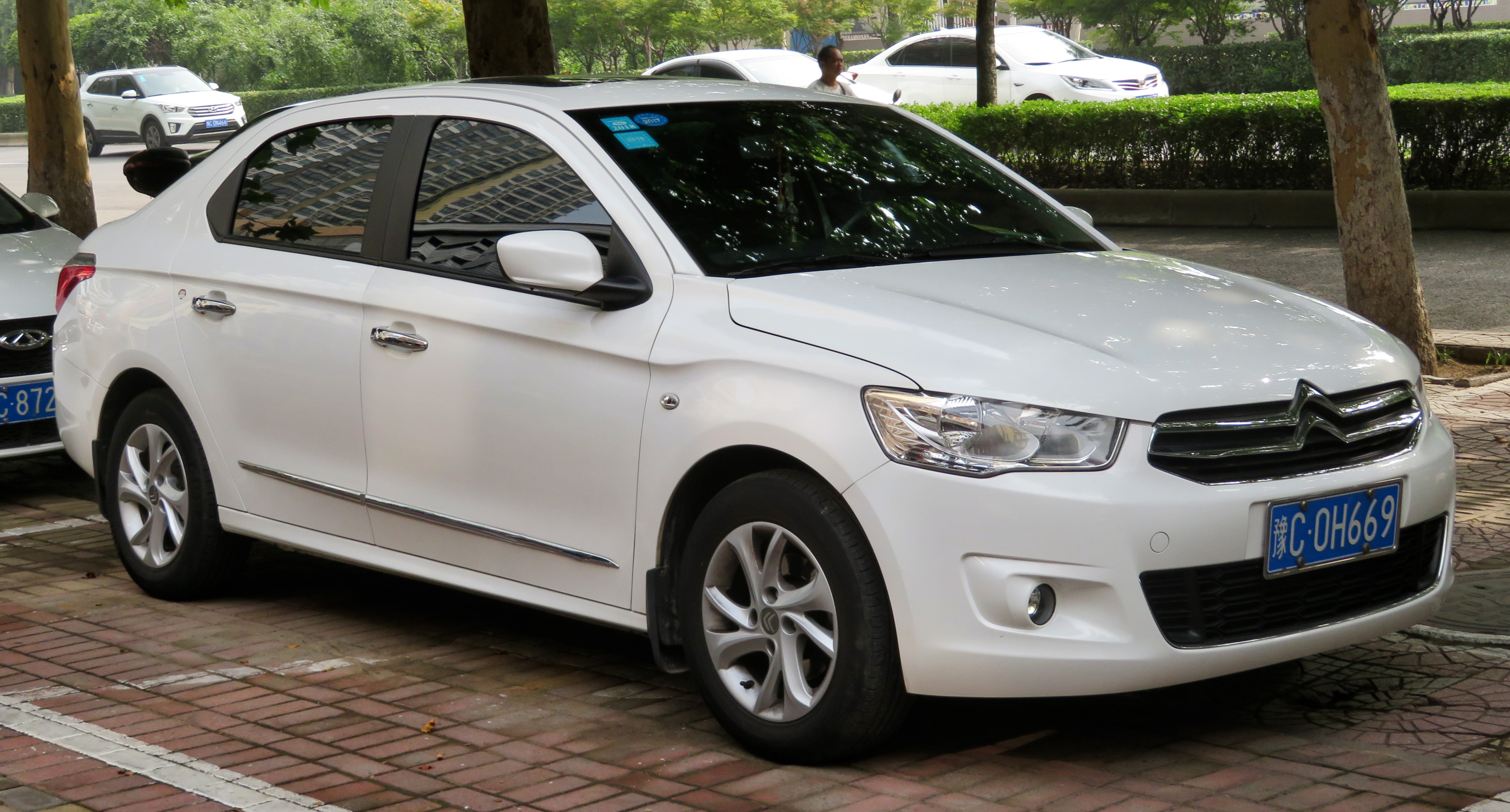

Overview
- Manufacturer: Citroën (Note: PSA Group (2012–2021); Stellantis (2021–2022))
- Also called: Peugeot 301; Dongfeng Fukang e-Elysée; Dongfeng Junfeng EV30; Citroën E-Elysée; Citroën C3L; IKCO Tara
- Production: 2012–2022
- Assembly: Spain: Vigo (PSA Vigo Plant); China: Wuhan (DPCA)

Body and chassis
- Class: Subcompact car
- Body style: 4-door saloon
- Layout: Front-engine, front-wheel-drive
- Platform: PSA PF1
- Related: Peugeot 207; Peugeot 208; Citroën C3; Citroën C3-XR; Citroën DS3

Powertrain
- Engine: Petrol: 1.2 L EB2 VTi/PureTech I3; 1.6 L EC5 VTi I4; Diesel: 1.5 L DV5 BlueHDi Turbodiesel I4; 1.6 L DV6 HDi/BlueHDi Turbodiesel I4
- Transmission: 5 or 6-speed manual 4-speed automatic 5-speed semi-automatic

Dimensions
- Wheelbase: 2,655 mm (104.5 in)
- Length: 4,442 mm (174.9 in)
- Width: 1,748 mm (68.8 in)
- Height: 1,446 mm (56.9 in)
- Kerb weight: 1,055–1,165 kg (2,326–2,568 lb)

Chronology
- Predecessor: Citroën Elysée
- Successor: Citroën C4 X (Europe)

Citroën C-Elysée is a subcompact (B-segment) sedan produced by the French manufacturer Citroën from 2012 to 2022, introduced at the Paris Motor Show the same year. It is closely related to the Peugeot 301, launched the same year. It was facelifted in November 2016.

== History ==
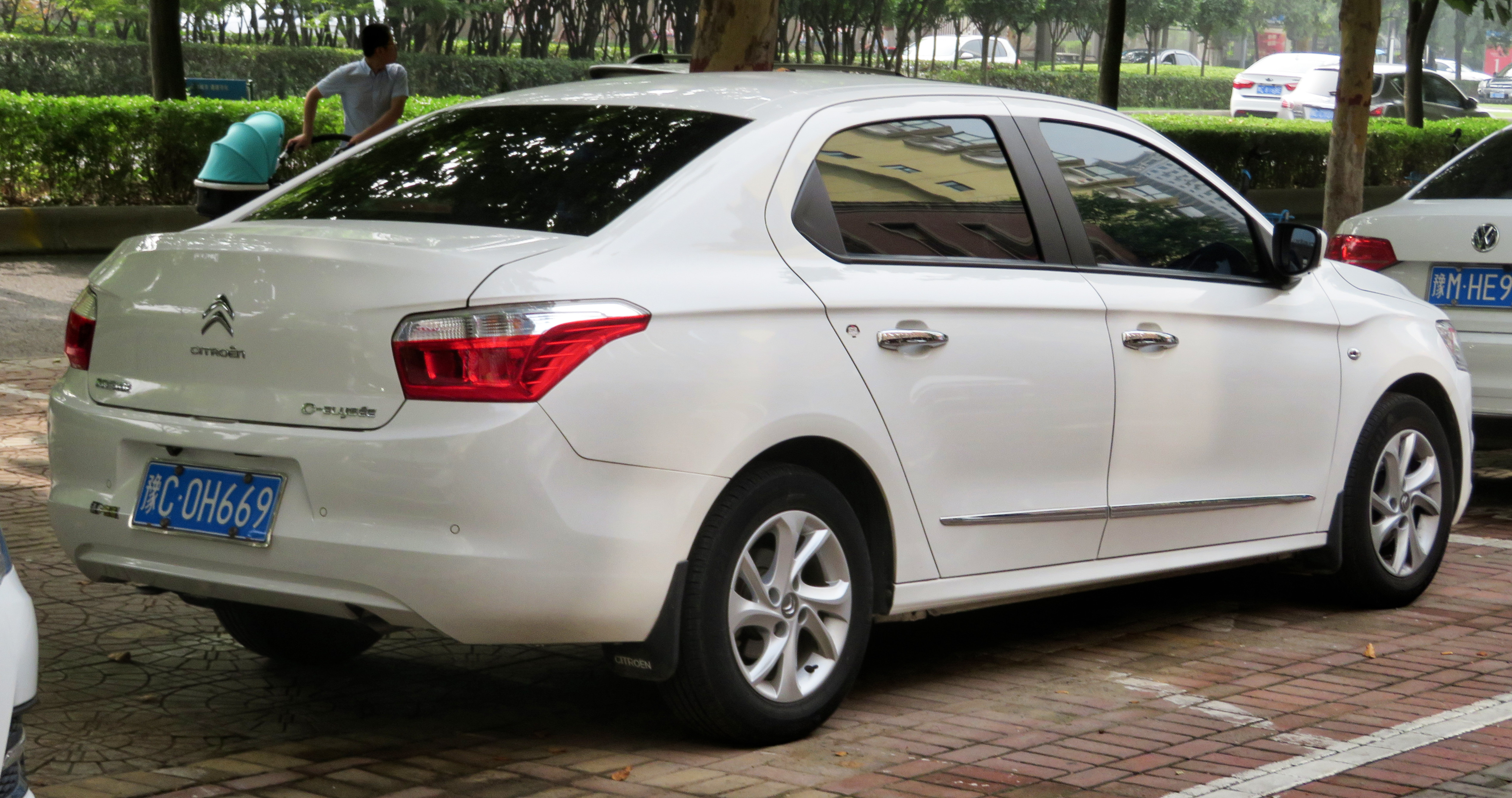
Rear view

On June 20, 2012, the second generation of C-Elysée was presented in France. The result of a global project, the car is no longer an exclusive model for the Chinese market but is a brand new car based on the front-wheel drive PSA platform called PF1 common to numerous models such as the Peugeot 208 and Citroën C3.

Specifically, the new C-Elysée was a close relative of the Peugeot 301 from which it also inherited numerous sheet metal such as the doors, fenders and rear trunk lid as well as the interiors while the front characterized by the grille in the shape of an elongated hexagon with the two bars was specific chrome that form the Citroën emblem in a much more pronounced way. The headlights are reminiscent of those of the second generation C4 in style. The wheelbase measures 2.655 meters and the body is 4.44 meters long (14 cm more than the previous model).

The engines are three and also integrate a diesel unit, consisting of the 1.6 HDi 92 bhp. The two petrol units are the 1199 cm³ three-cylinder EB2 with maximum power of 72 hp and a 1.6 EC5 four-cylinder 1587 cm³ with maximum power of 115 hp. Production takes place in Spain in Vigo for export to South European, Eastern European, Latin American, Middle-Eastern and African countries while the version for the Chinese market has been produced since 2013 in Wuhan through the joint venture with Dongfeng.

In the Spring of 2016, the C-Elysée also lands in several European markets, including Metropolitan France (it was already marketed in French overseas territories) and Italy. There are two engines planned for Europe, the 82 bhp 1.2 PureTech and the 99 bhp 1.6 BlueHDi. In the Chinese market, however, the 115 bhp 1.6 EC5 remains as the only engine, while at the Beijing Motor Show.

=== 2016 facelift ===
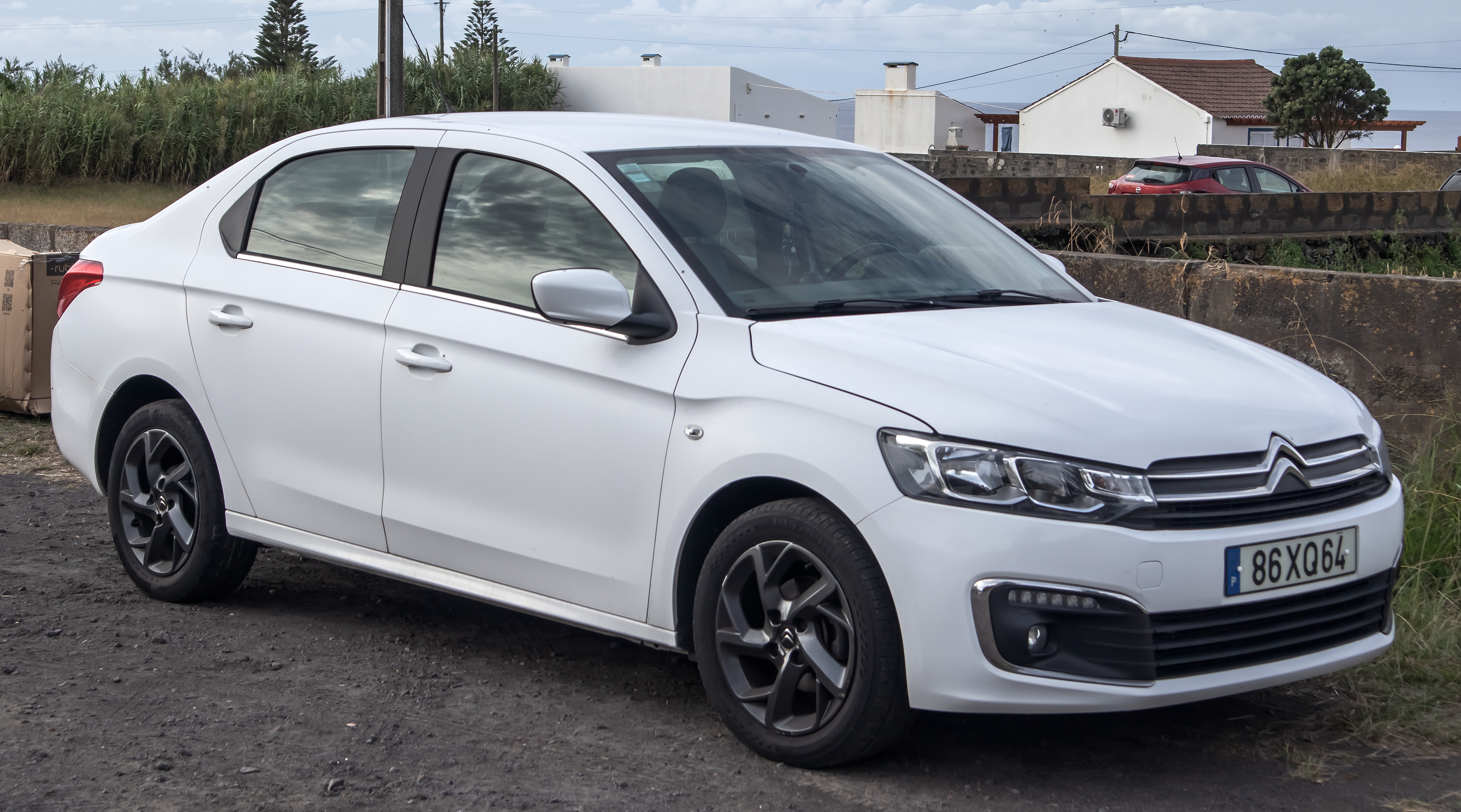

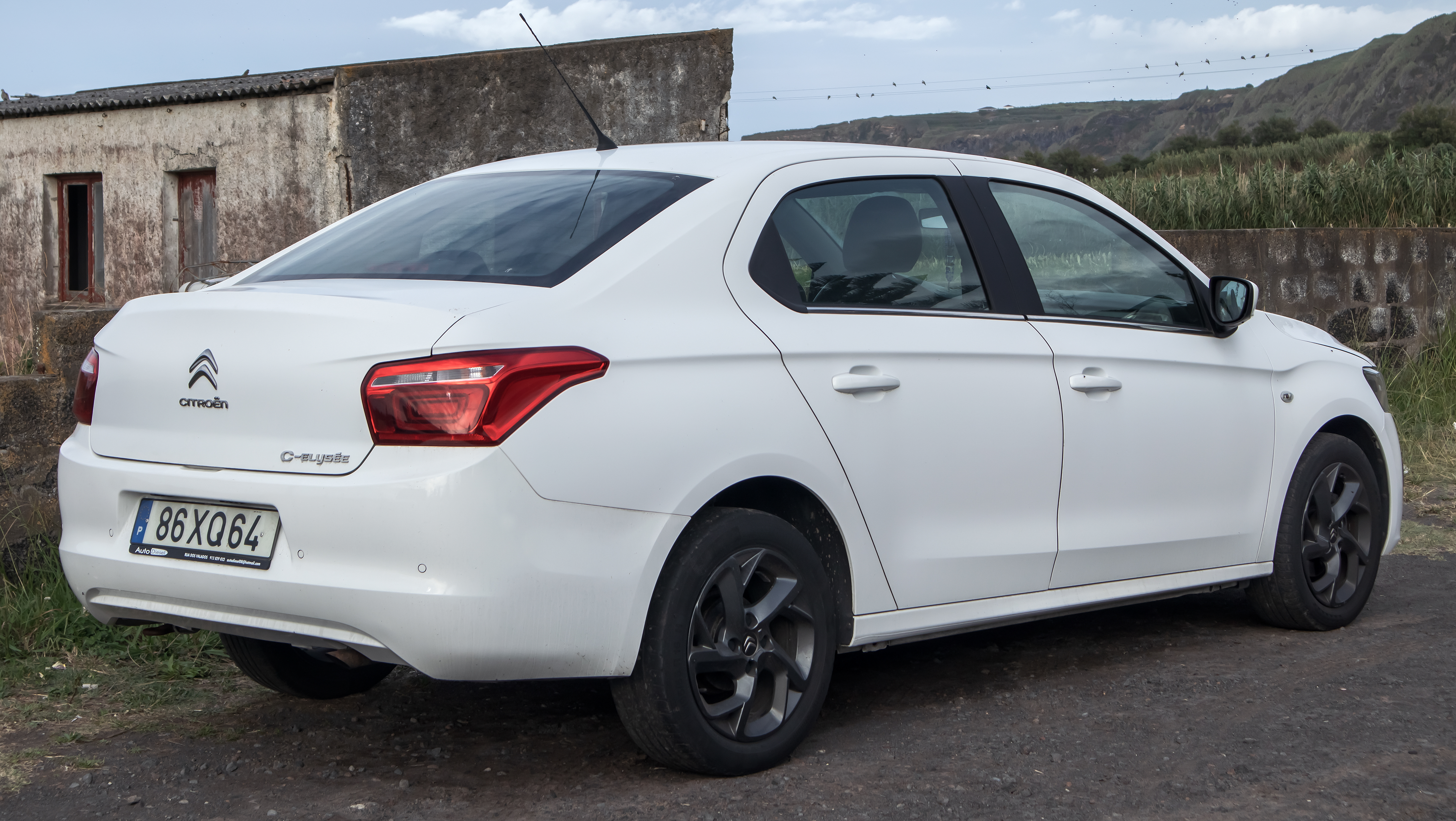
Facelift

In November 2016 the car was restyled with the redesign of the grille, now wider and the front and rear light clusters, now with a three-dimensional effect. As for the equipment, a new 7-inch touchscreen multimedia system compatible with Apple CarPlay and Android Auto has been installed. The engine range, on the other hand, remained unchanged.

In 2018 the range underwent a drastic downsizing: while in China the usual 115 bhp 1.6 continued to be used, in Europe the engine range present up to that moment was downsized and significantly modified: only the 82 bhp 1.2 engine remained available and debuted the new 100 bhp 1.5 BlueHDi. Only in Poland did the old 99 HP 1.6 Blue HDI continue to be used. Since the beginning of 2019 the C-Elysée has been discontinued in some European countries, such as France.

== Citroën E-Elysée ==
Presented on April 25, 2016 at the Beijing Motor Show, the E-Elysée is an electrically powered prototype of the C-Elysée. Equipped with a lithium-ion battery capable of guaranteeing a range of 250 km. The car was unveiled together with the other Citroën electric car, the ë-Méhari. The overall dimensions and the bodywork remain the same as the thermal versions but the overall mass increases due to the greater weight of the batteries used. Only planned for the Chinese market, the production never started.

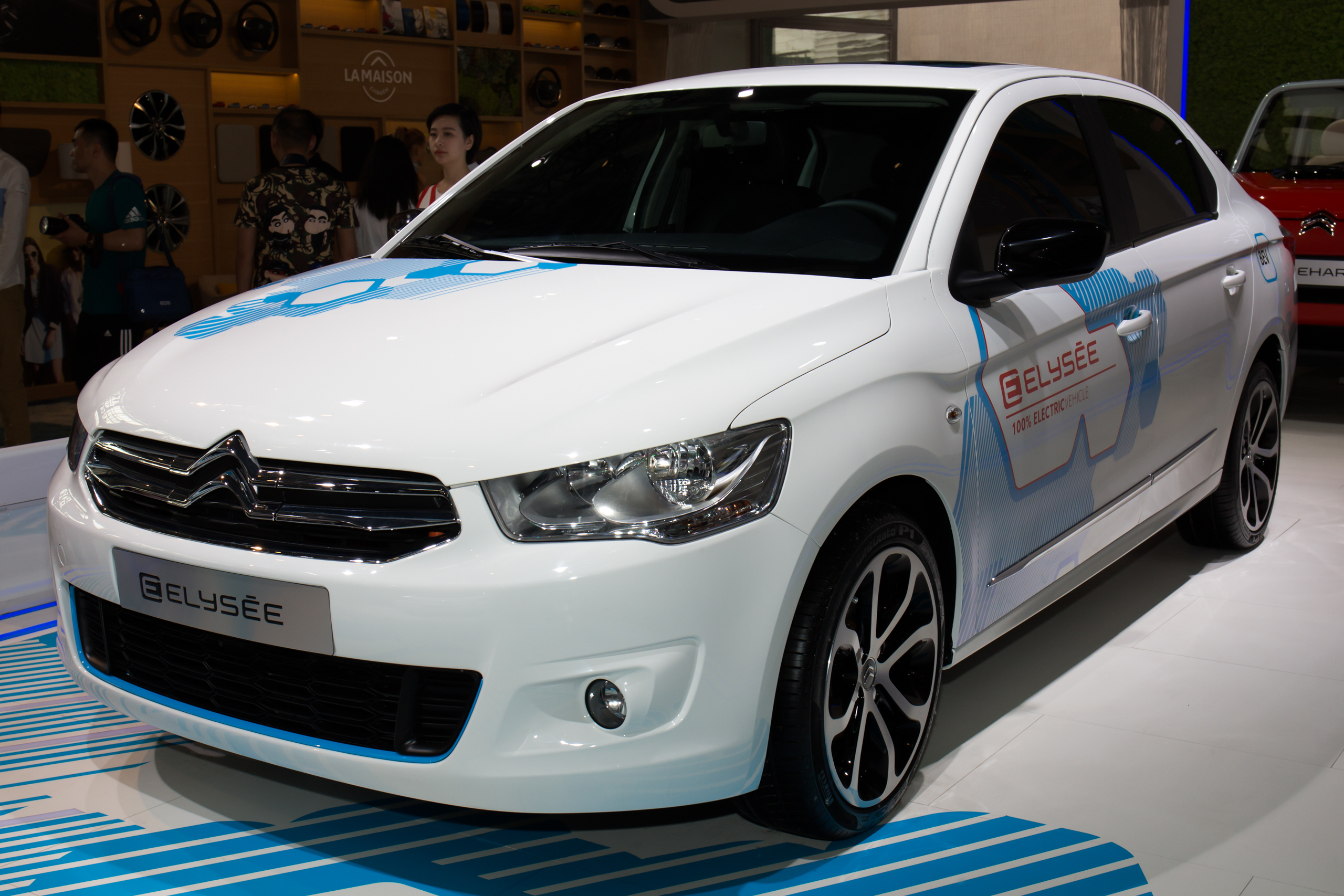
E-Elysée concept 2016

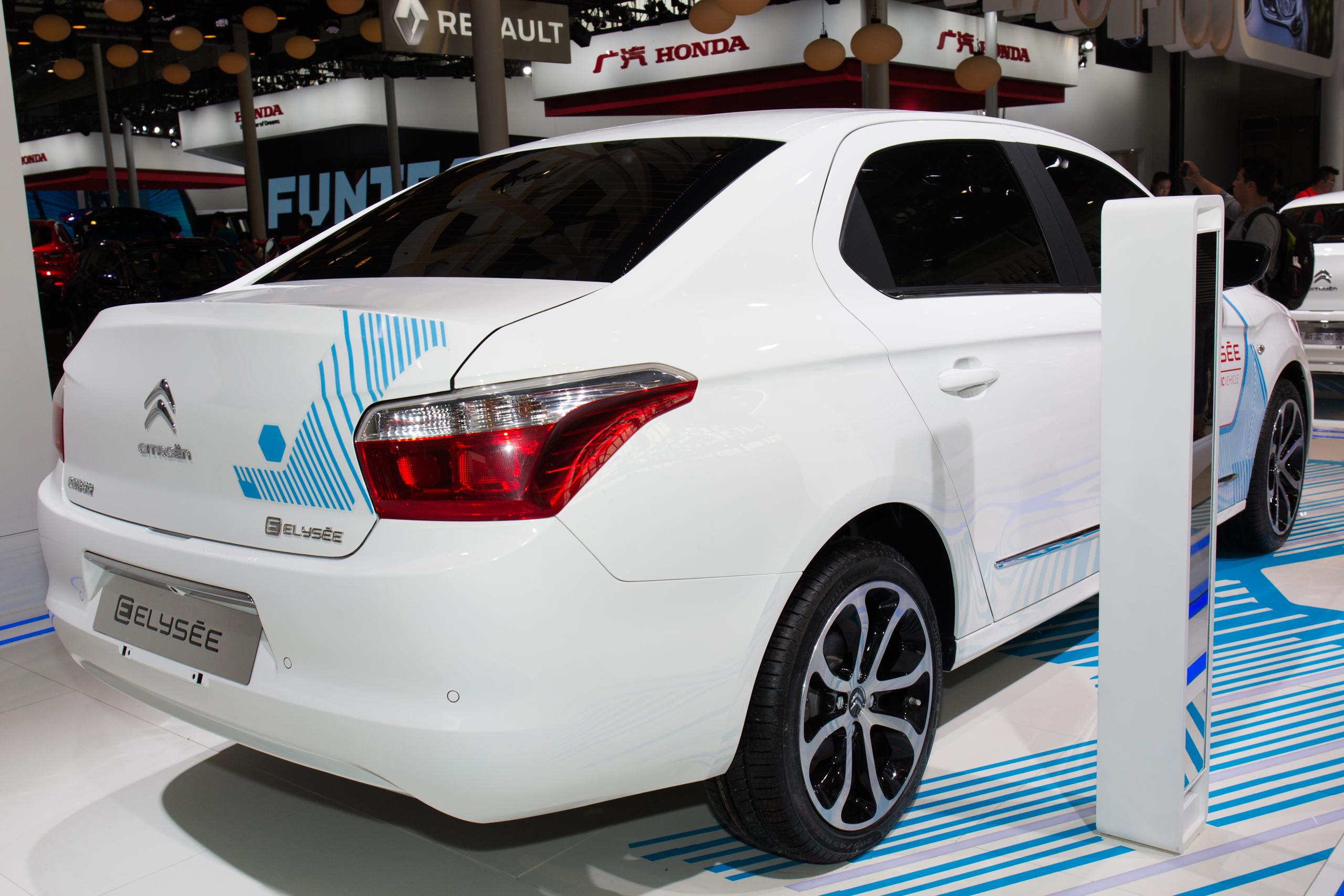
Rear view

== Dongfeng Junfeng EV30 / Dongfeng Fukang E-Elysée ==
Replaced in China in 2020 by the C3-L, the C-Elysée continues to be produced in another form. Dongfeng launched an electric version as part of two new joint venture brands, Junfeng and Fukang. The second name is a tribute to the 1992 Citroën Fukang. The full name of this electric C-Elysée are Dongfeng Junfeng EV30 (from 2018) and Dongfeng Fukang E-Elysée (from 2021). Both vehicles are mainly aimed at driving education market.

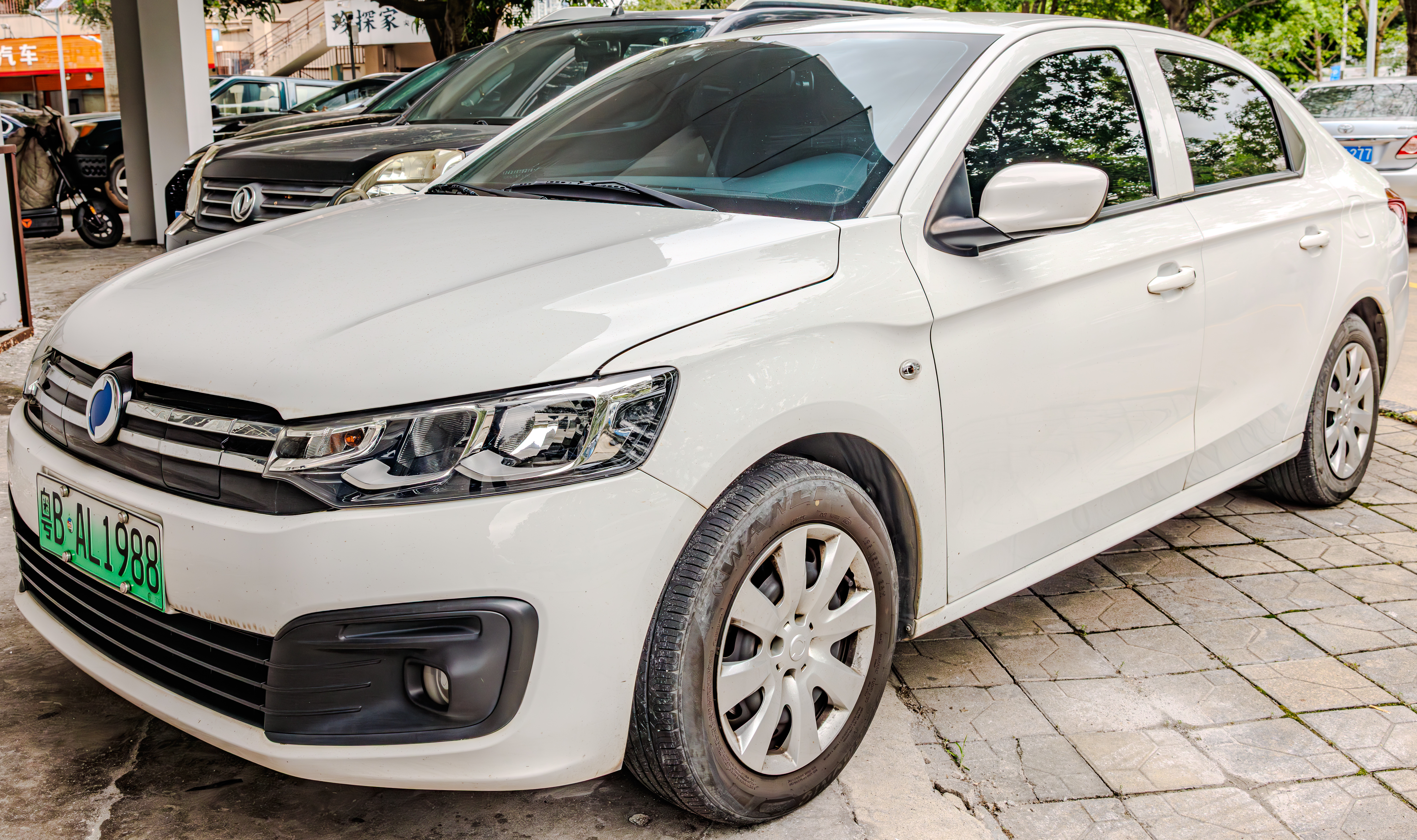
Dongfeng Fukang E-Elysée

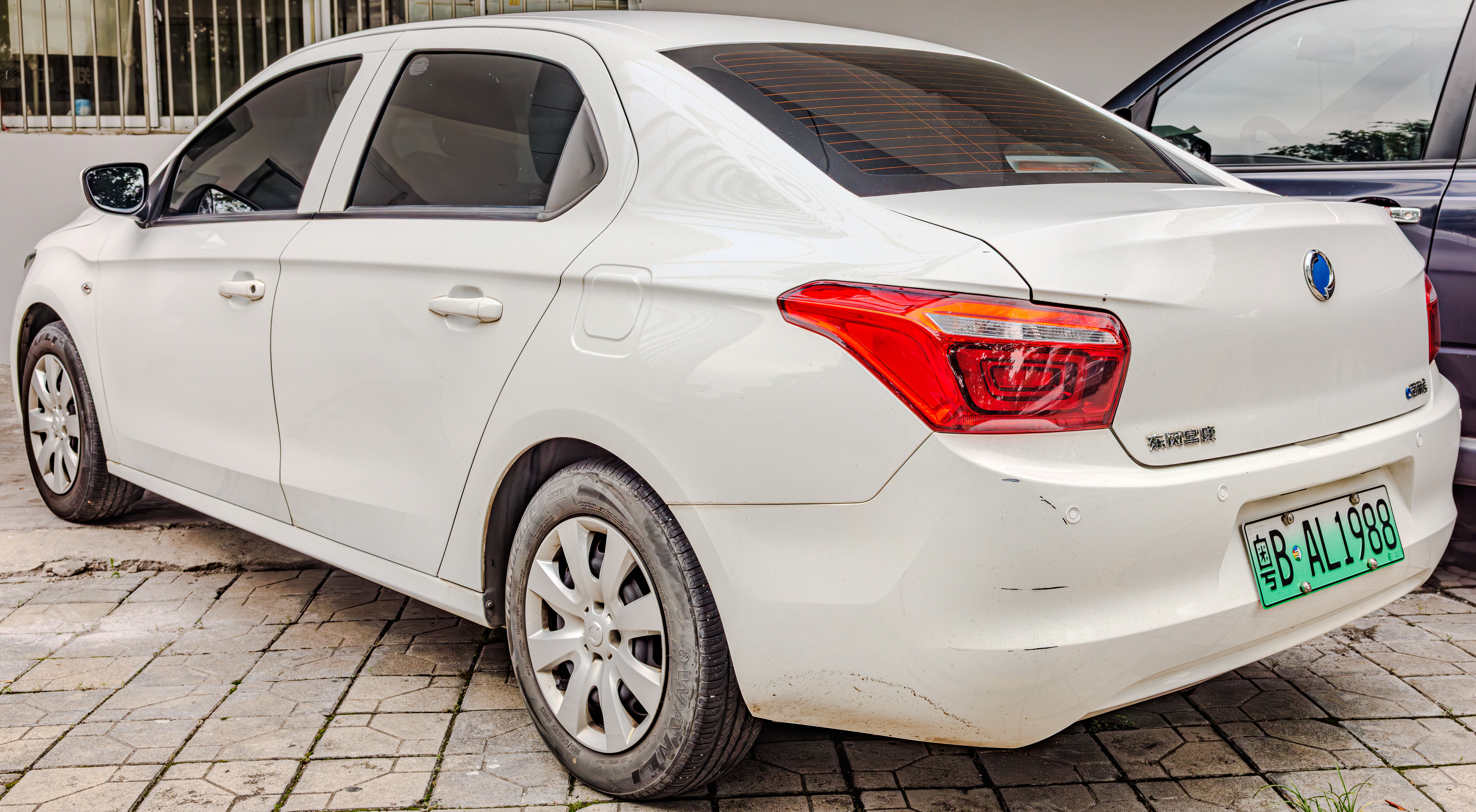
Rear view

== Citroën C3L ==
The C3L is the crossover-sedan version of the C-Elysée produced only for Chinese market at the Wuhan plant. The design incorporates numerous elements from the C3-XR, another vehicle derived from the C-Elysee. The suspension is raised and the bodywork has plastic protections in the bumpers and along the side. The Citroën C3L is 4,505 mm long, 1,748 mm wide, 1,513 mm tall with a 2,655 mm long wheelbase. The engine is a 1.2-liter VTi three-cylinder producing 114 hp and 140 lb-ft (190 Nm) of torque and mated to a six-speed Aisin automatic transmission. The C3L replaced the C-Elysée in China.

== Motorsport ==
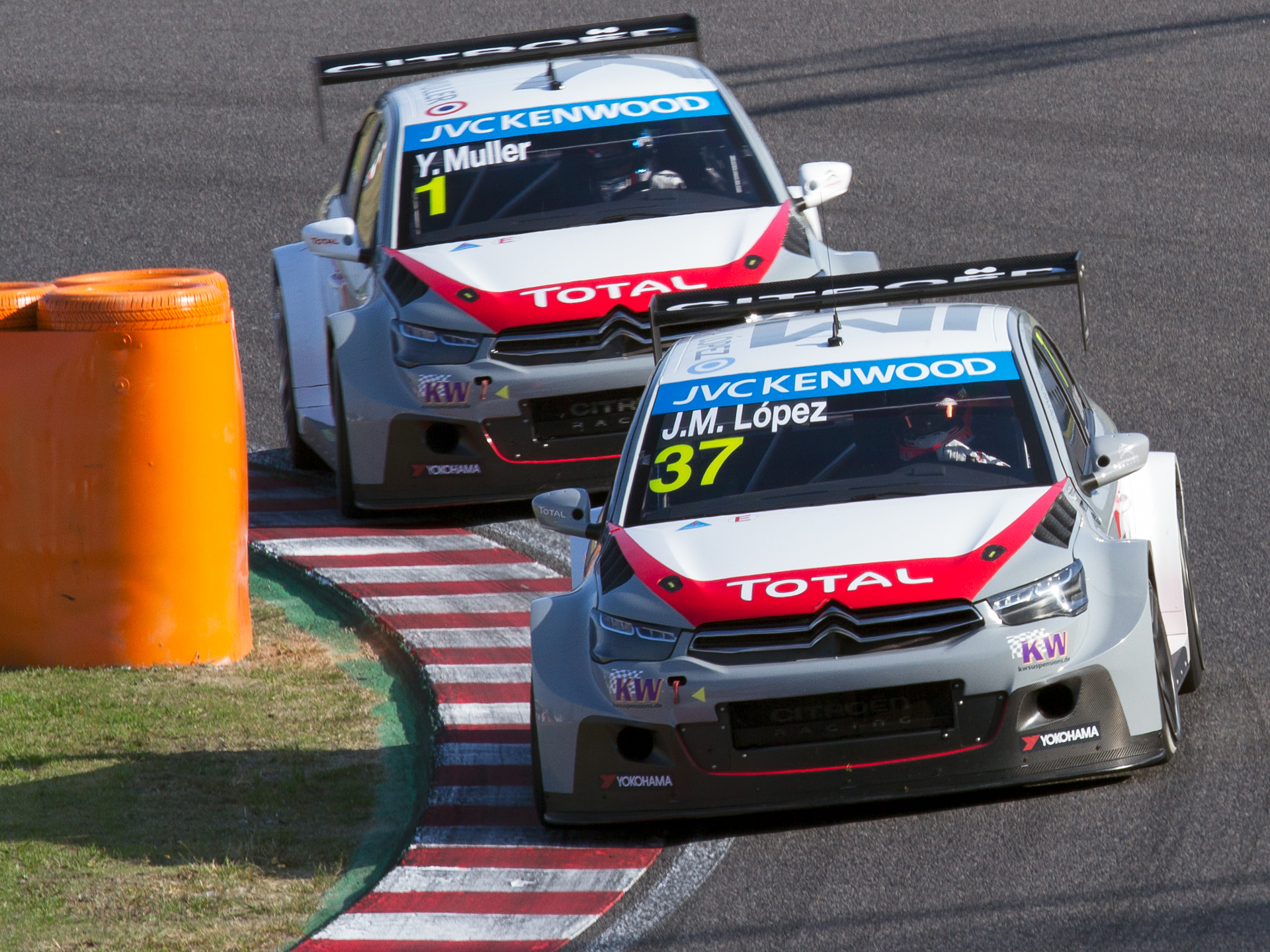
2014 Citroën C-Elysée WTCC

In 2012, Citroën announced plans to enter the World Touring Car Championship. The team transformed a DS3 WRC into a laboratory vehicle to help with early development, while the engine was an evolution of their WRC engine which had been used in the WRC since 2011. Citroën started developing the car for the new TC1 regulations, which were brought forward a year early in 2014 to expedite the entry of Citroën into the championship. The introduction of the new regulations a year earlier than planned gave a seven month development headstart to Citroën over the other manufacturers. This large development advantage combined with a big budget and a strong driver line-up made Citroën the clear favourite going into the first season of the new regulations in 2014. Citroën would go on to win most of the races that season as well as the manufacturers' title, while José María López won the drivers' title. The team would repeat this feat in 2015 and 2016, before the factory team left the series at the end of 2016. A number of Citroëns were still raced by other teams in 2017, but were outpaced by the Hondas and the Volvos.
