= Citroën Fukang =

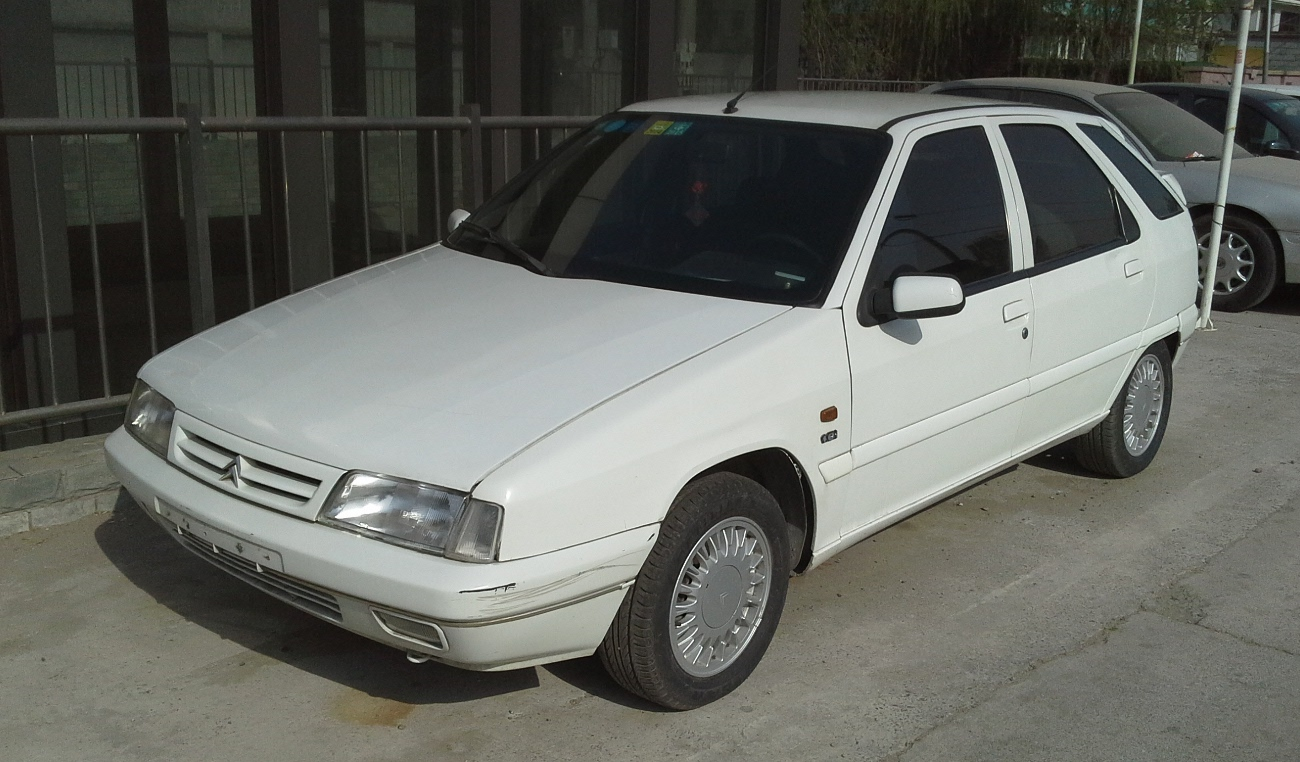
- Citroën Fukang hatch

Overview
- Manufacturer: Dongfeng Peugeot-Citroën Automobile
- Also called: Dongfeng N15 (van); Dongfeng EQ1010F (van)
- Production: 1992–2009
- Assembly: China: Xiangyang; Wuhan

Body and chassis
- Class: Compact
- Body style: 5-door hatchback 4-door saloon 2-door panel van 4-door pickup truck
- Layout: FF layout
- Related: Citroën ZX; Citroën Elysée; Citroën C-Elysée; Maple Hisoon

Powertrain
- Engine: 1.4 L TU3JP/K I4; 1.6 L N6A 10FX3A I4
- Transmission: 5-speed manual

Chronology
- Successor: Citroën Elysée

The Citroën Fukang is a series of compact vehicles available in a variety of body styles. It was the first in a range of cars produced for the Chinese market by the Dongfeng Peugeot-Citroën Automobile group, a joint venture between the French PSA Peugeot Citroën and Chinese manufacturer Dongfeng Motor Corporation.

== Overview ==
The first Fukang appeared in 1992 as a semi-knock down production, rebadged Citroën ZX hatchback. The car was called the Fukang DC7140 in China, the name translating as ‘Prosperity and Health’ in Chinese. Later on, the DC7160 with a fuel-injected 1.6 liter engine was added to the lineup. 17,000 of the SKD ZXs were built until late 1996, when Dongfeng's own two plants in Wuhan became up to speed and local production commenced. Local capacity was 150,000 per annum.

Two years later, the first of a number of special Chinese market Citroën models was launched when the Citroën Fukang 988 arrived. Presented in September 1998, this was a saloon version of the Fukang DC7160 and originally featured the larger 1.6 litre, fuel-injected engine. The saloon Fukang was developed by specialist engineering firm Heuliez, who also developed a long wheelbase limousine version called the Fukang 988 VIP.

The saloon versions continued until 2003, when they were replaced by an updated version of the theme, the Citroën Elysée. However, the hatchback Fukang continued to be part of the Chinese Citroën range until 2009.

On February 26, 2009, the new facelifted Citroën C-Elysée hatchback finally replaced the Fukang. These models had also been joined in 2006 by the Citroën Xsara, Picasso, and the C-Triomphe. The Fukang was also available in the form of a 4-door pickup truck and a 2-door panel van.

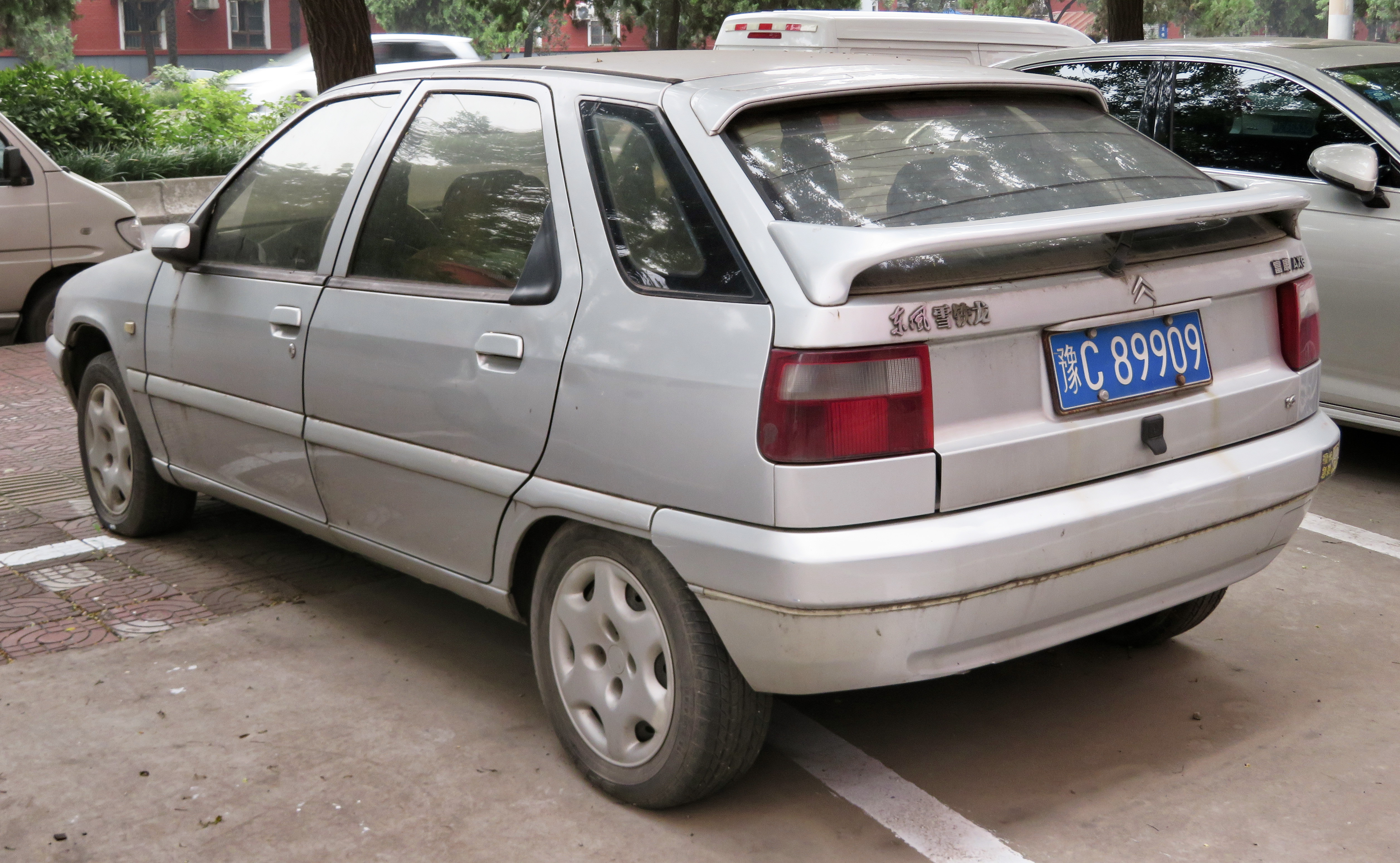
2001 Fukang AXC hatchback (rear view)

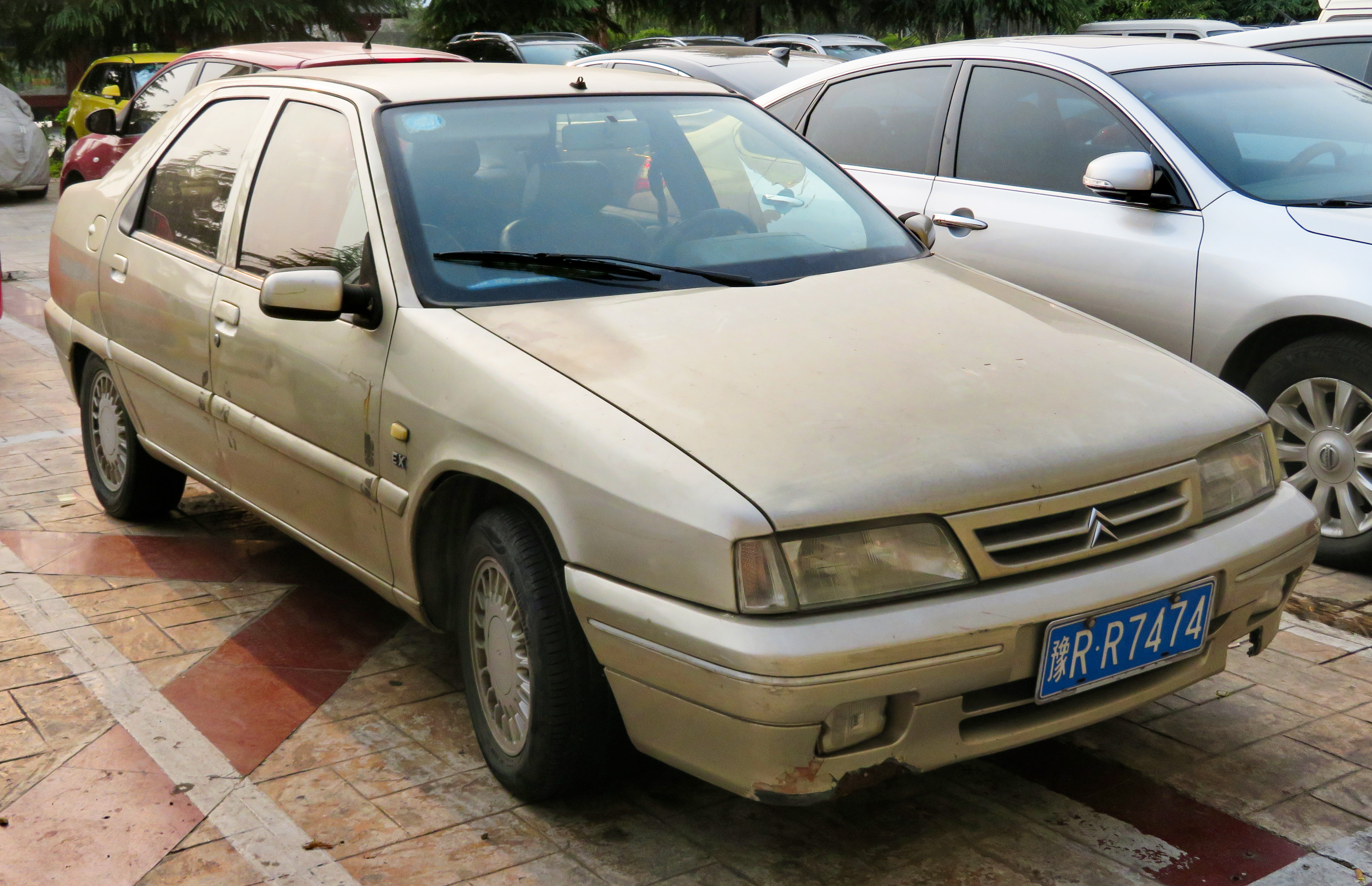
2000 Fukang 988 saloon

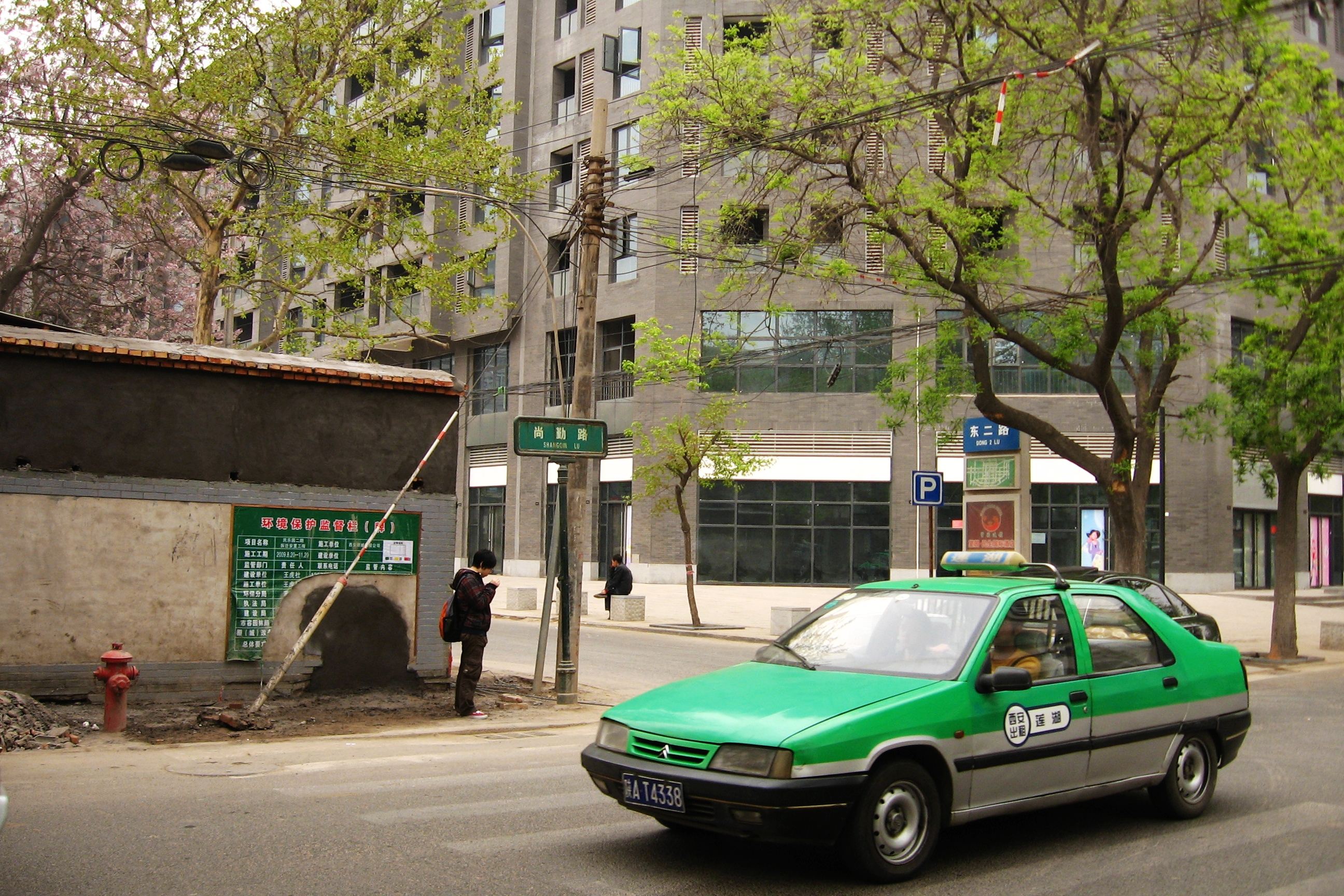
Fukang 988 taxi in Xi'an, China

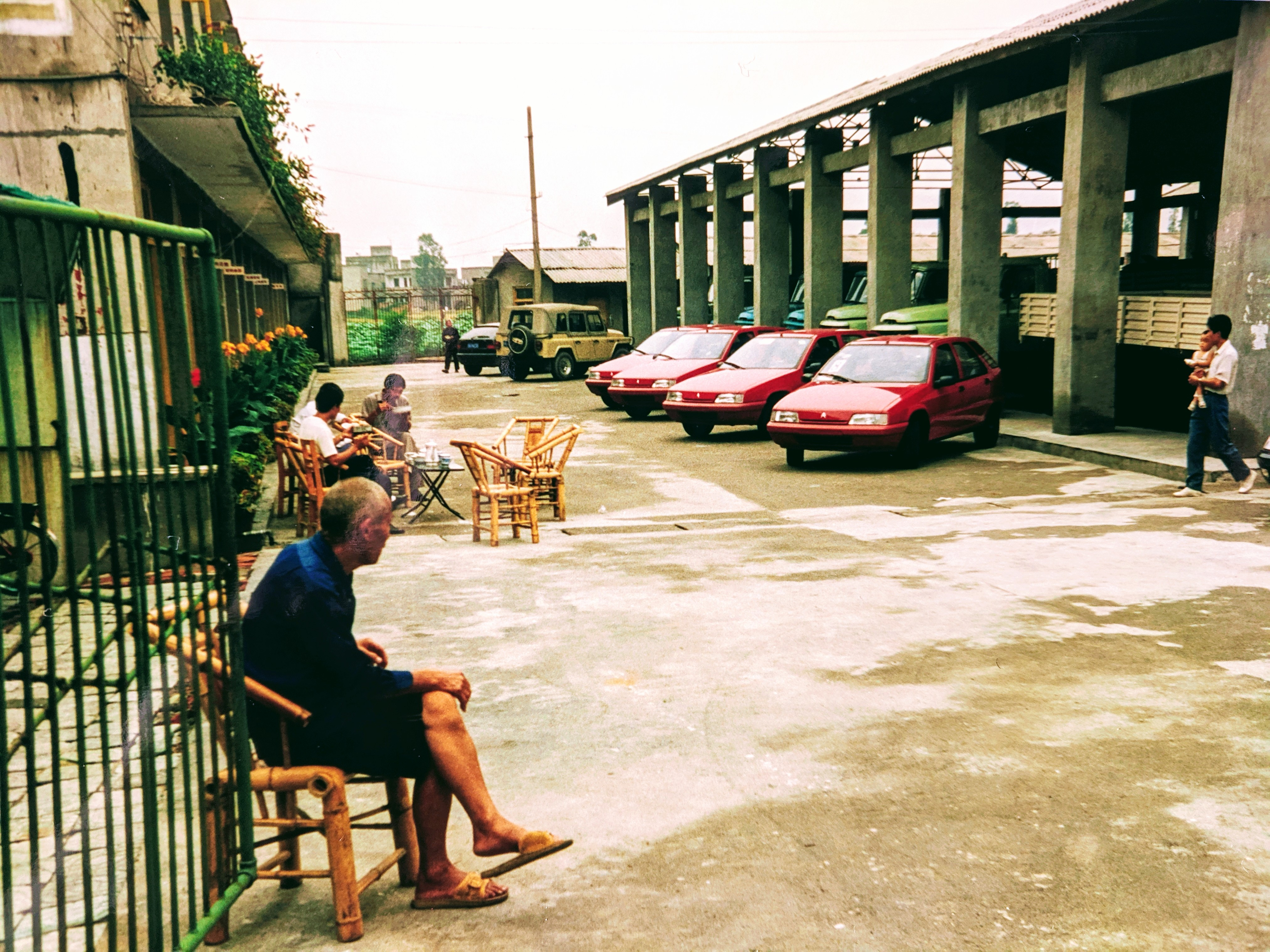
1994 Citroën ZX Fukang models for sale - made by truck manufacturer Second Automobile Works (第二汽车制造厂) through Dongfeng Peugeot-Citroën joint venture

=== Awards ===
- In 2005, the Fukang was voted 'China's Best Value car' by Sina Automobile News, China Youth Today and Beijing Modern Business News.

== Reuse of the Fukang name ==
The Fukang name was later reused by Shenlong Motors, a joint venture company jointly funded by Dongfeng Motor and PSA Group in 1992. The joint venture launched products sold under the Dongfeng Fukang brand including the Fukang ES500, Fukang ES600 and Fukang e-Elysée (electric Citroën C-Elysée).
