= VTi Engine =

Automobile variable valve timing technology

The VTi (Variable Valve Lift and Timing injection) Engine is a variable valve timing (VVT) system for Prince engine created by PSA (Peugeot, Citroën, DS Automobiles) and Mini from the BMW Group.

The two variants are a 1.4-liter, 95 bhp (71 kW) engine and a 1.6-liter, 115 bhp (86 kW) engine. Peugeot claims these engines have the capability to reduce fuel consumption on a Peugeot 307 by more than 10% when compared to the 1.6-liter, 100 bhp (75 kW) engine.

== Applications ==
The vehicles using VTi Engines are:

- Citroën C3 - 1.4 L 16V 95–98 bhp (71–73 kW), 1.6 L 16V 120 bhp (89 kW)
- Citroën C3 Picasso - 1.4 L, 1.6 L
- Citroën C4 - 1.4 L 16V 95–98 bhp (71–73 kW), 1.6 L 16V 120 bhp (89 kW)
- Citroën C4 Picasso - 1.6 L
- Citroën DS3 - 1.6 L
- Citroën DS4 - 1.6 L
- Citroën C-Elysée - 1.2 L 16V 72 bhp (54 kW), 1.6 L 16V 115 bhp (86 kW)
- Peugeot 108 - 1.0 L 8V 68 bhp (51 kW), 1.2 L 16V 82 bhp (61 kW)
- Peugeot 207 - 1.4 L 16V 95–98 bhp (71–73 kW), 1.6 L 16V 120 bhp (89 kW)
- Peugeot 208 - 1.0 L, 1.2 L, 1.4 L, 1.6 L
- Peugeot 301 (2012) - 1.2 L 16V 72 bhp (54 kW), 1.6 L 16V 115 bhp (86 kW)
- Peugeot 308 - 1.4 L 16V 95–98 bhp (71–73 kW), 1.6 L 16V 120 bhp (89 kW)
- Peugeot 508 - 1.6 L
- Peugeot 2008 - 1.2 L, 1.6 L
- Peugeot 3008 - 1.6 L
- Peugeot 5008 - 1.6 L
- Mini Hatch, Mini Clubman, Mini Countryman - 1.4 L (One), 1.6 L (Cooper)

== Also called ==
- Prince engine
