= PSA TU engine =

TU/EC engine
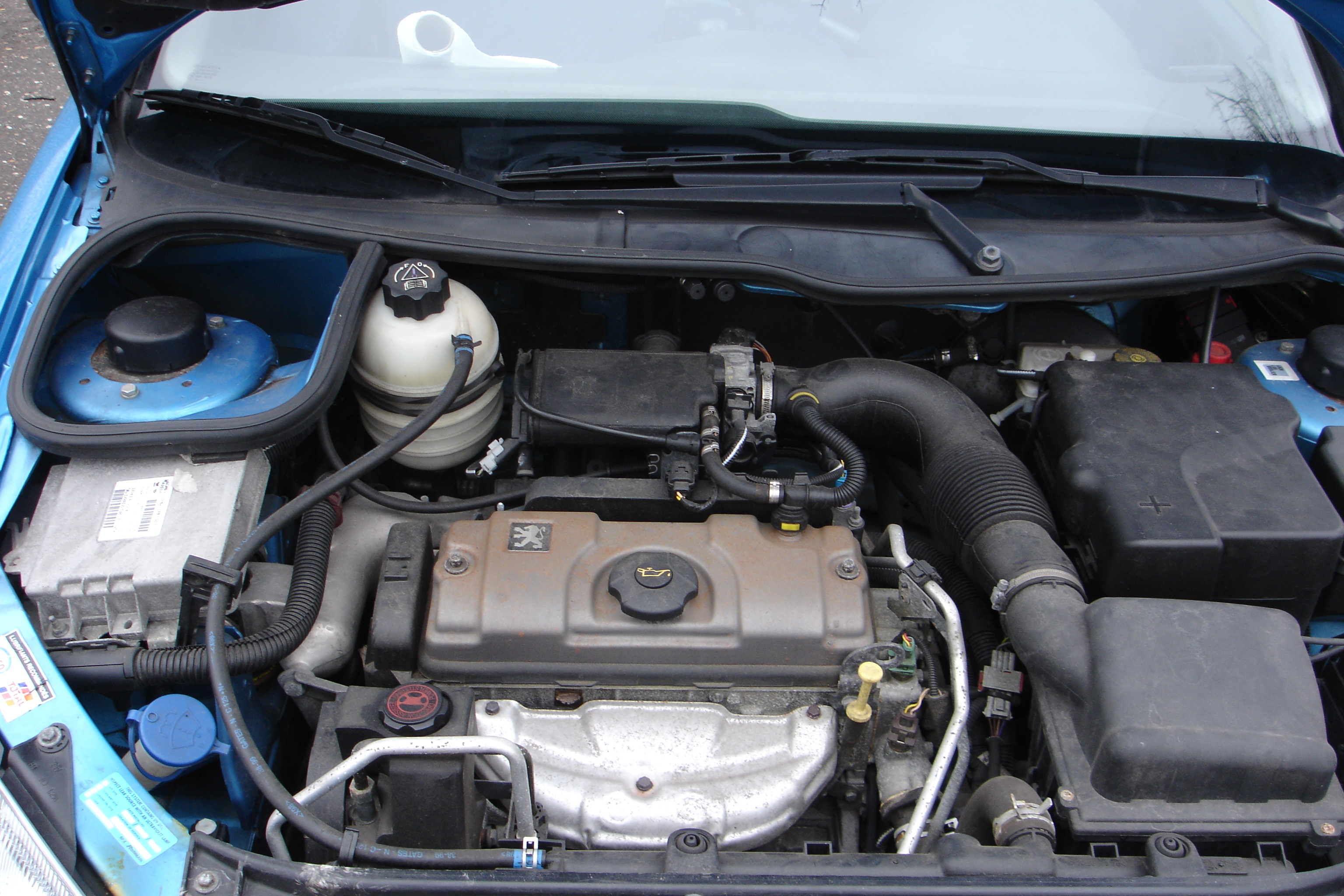
- TU1JP engine in a 1999 Peugeot 206

Overview
- Manufacturer: PSA Peugeot Citroën
- Production: October 1986 – December 2014

Layout
- Configuration: Naturally aspirated Inline-4
- Displacement: 1.0 L (954 cc); 1.1 L (1,124 cc); 1.3 L (1,294 cc); 1.4 L (1,360 cc); 1.5 L (1,527 cc); 1.6 L (1,587 cc)
- Cylinder bore: 70 mm (2.76 in); 72 mm (2.83 in); 75 mm (2.95 in); 77 mm (3.03 in); 78.5 mm (3.09 in)
- Piston stroke: 62 mm (2.44 in); 69 mm (2.72 in); 73 mm (2.87 in); 77 mm (3.03 in); 82 mm (3.23 in)
- Cylinder block material: Aluminium, Cast iron
- Cylinder head material: Aluminium
- Valvetrain: SOHC 8-valve; DOHC 16-valve, available VVT

Combustion
- Fuel system: Solex or Weber carburetors Central fuel injection Multi point injection Indirect injection (Diesel engines)
- Management: Magneti Marelli, Bosch or Lucas
- Fuel type: Petrol or Diesel
- Cooling system: Water-cooled

Output
- Power output: 45–125 PS (33–92 kW; 44–123 hp)

Emissions
- Emissions target standard: Euro III, Euro IV
- Emissions control systems: Catalytic converter

Chronology
- Predecessor: PSA-Renault X-Type engine Simca Poissy engine
- Successor: PSA EP engine (Prince engine) (for TU engines); Ford DLD engine (for TUD engines)

The TU family of small Four-stroke inline-four piston engines by PSA Peugeot Citroën were introduced in 1986 and used in the Peugeot and Citroën range of cars. It was first installed in the Citroën AX in October 1986, replacing the X family, although it shared many components with its predecessor. The TU was available in either petrol or a naturally aspirated diesel variant, the latter called TUD.

The TU engine was distantly related to the older X-Type engine – sharing a similar overhead camshaft architecture, but the key differences are the belt driven camshaft (the X is chain driven), and that the TU is mounted in a conventional upright position with a separate, end-on mounted transmission and unequal length drive shafts. The X engine, by comparison, had an integral transmission mounted on the side of the crankcase (giving rise to its popular nickname the "suitcase engine"), sharing a common oil supply and was mounted almost lying flat on its side within the car.

After the engine debuted in the Citroën AX in 1986, it quickly began replacing the X engine in most of its remaining applications – the Peugeot 205, Citroën BX and Citroën C15 had all transitioned by 1988 whilst it replaced the Simca "Poissy" engine in the Peugeot 309 in 1991. It was also used in the following cars: Citroën: AX, Saxo, C2, C3, C4, BX, ZX, Xsara, Nemo and Berlingo. Peugeot: 106, 206, 207, 306, 307, 405, Bipper, Partner and Hoggar, the Iranian Peugeot 405 and Peugeot Pars as well as the IKCO Runna.

The TUD engine was only used in 11 cars of which 6 were non-PSA models: the Citroën AX, Citroën Saxo, Citroën Xsara; Peugeot 106, Rover Metro/100-series, Nissan Micra, Maruti Suzuki Zen D/Di and Maruti Suzuki Esteem D/Di and IKCO Samand, and the Tata Indigo 1.4 TD. The Tata's is a smaller version of the TUD engine, based on the 1.5D.

PSA has now stopped production of original TU engines, although the closely related EC engine family is still in production for emerging markets such as China and Russia and available in 1.6, 1.8 and 2.0 litre versions.

The IKCO EF engines, jointly developed by Iran Khodro and F.E.V GmbH of Germany, are closely related to the TU engines.

== TU9 ==
The TU9 was the entry-level version, used in a variety of cars including the Citroën AX, Saxo, Peugeot 205 and 106. It had a displacement of 1.0 L (954 cc), with a bore and a stroke of 70 mm × 62 mm (2.76 in × 2.44 in). Power was initially 45 PS (33 kW; 44 hp), but it was increased to 50 PS (37 kW; 49 hp) in 1992, with the adoption of central fuel injection and a catalytic converter. Production was stopped in the Citroën Saxo and Peugeot 106 with the introduction of Euro III in 2001. Early versions of this engine suffered premature piston failure which were of a special fuel-saving low-friction design. Symptoms were piston slap, especially with a cold engine, excessive oil consumption and exhaust smoke. PSA repaired the affected vehicles under warranty. This involved fitting a revised piston design and replacement liners.

Model	Output	Notes
TU9 M/Z	50 PS (37 kW; 49 hp)	Fuel injection catalyst
TU9/K	45 PS (33 kW; 44 hp)	1-bbl carburettor

== TU1 ==
The TU1 has a displacement of 1.1 L (1,124 cc), with a bore and a stroke of 72 mm × 69 mm (2.83 in × 2.72 in). Power was initially 55 PS (40 kW; 54 hp), but it was increased to 60 PS (44 kW; 59 hp) in 1992, with the adoption of central fuel injection and a catalytic converter. The introduction of Euro III led to the adoption of multi point injection, but power remained the same (although there was a small torque increase). This engine was the entry-level option in the Citroën C2 and C3 and Peugeot 206.

Model	Output	Notes
TU1 F2/K	60 PS (44 kW; 59 hp)	1-bbl carburettor
TU1 JP	60 PS (44 kW; 59 hp)	Fuel injection catalyst
TU1 M, TU1 M/Z	60 PS (44 kW; 59 hp)	Fuel injection catalyst
TU1/K	55 PS (40 kW; 54 hp)	1-bbl carburettor

== TU2 ==
There are two engines in this series, both developed for competition use, the first is carburettor fed (TU24) based on the TU1 and the second has electronic fuel injection (TU2) based on the TU3.

The TU24 has a displacement of 1.3 L (1,294 cc), with a bore and a stroke of 75 mm × 73 mm (2.95 in × 2.87 in). Power was initially 95 PS (70 kW; 94 hp), powering the Citroën AX Sport using Solex carburettors, but a slightly more powerful version of the TU24 was developed for the Peugeot 205 Rallye with a longer intake manifold and slightly larger venturi size in the Weber carburetors.

The later TU2 version with 100 PS (74 kW; 99 hp) was created in 1992 for the Peugeot 106 Rallye, with the adoption of a Magneti Marelli fuel injection system and a catalytic converter. This version in the 106 Rallye uses the taller TU3 aluminium block, different con rod lengths and pistons. The aluminium heads also differ slightly in port location and with different camshafts.

Model	Output	Notes
TU24 (M4A)	95 PS (70 kW; 94 hp)	twin 2-bbl carb Solex ADDHE 40 / Weber DCOM 40
TU24 (M2A)	103 PS (76 kW; 102 hp)	twin 2-bbl carb Weber DCOM 40
TU2 J2/Z (MFZ)	100 PS (74 kW; 99 hp)	Fuel injection, catalyst

== TU3 ==
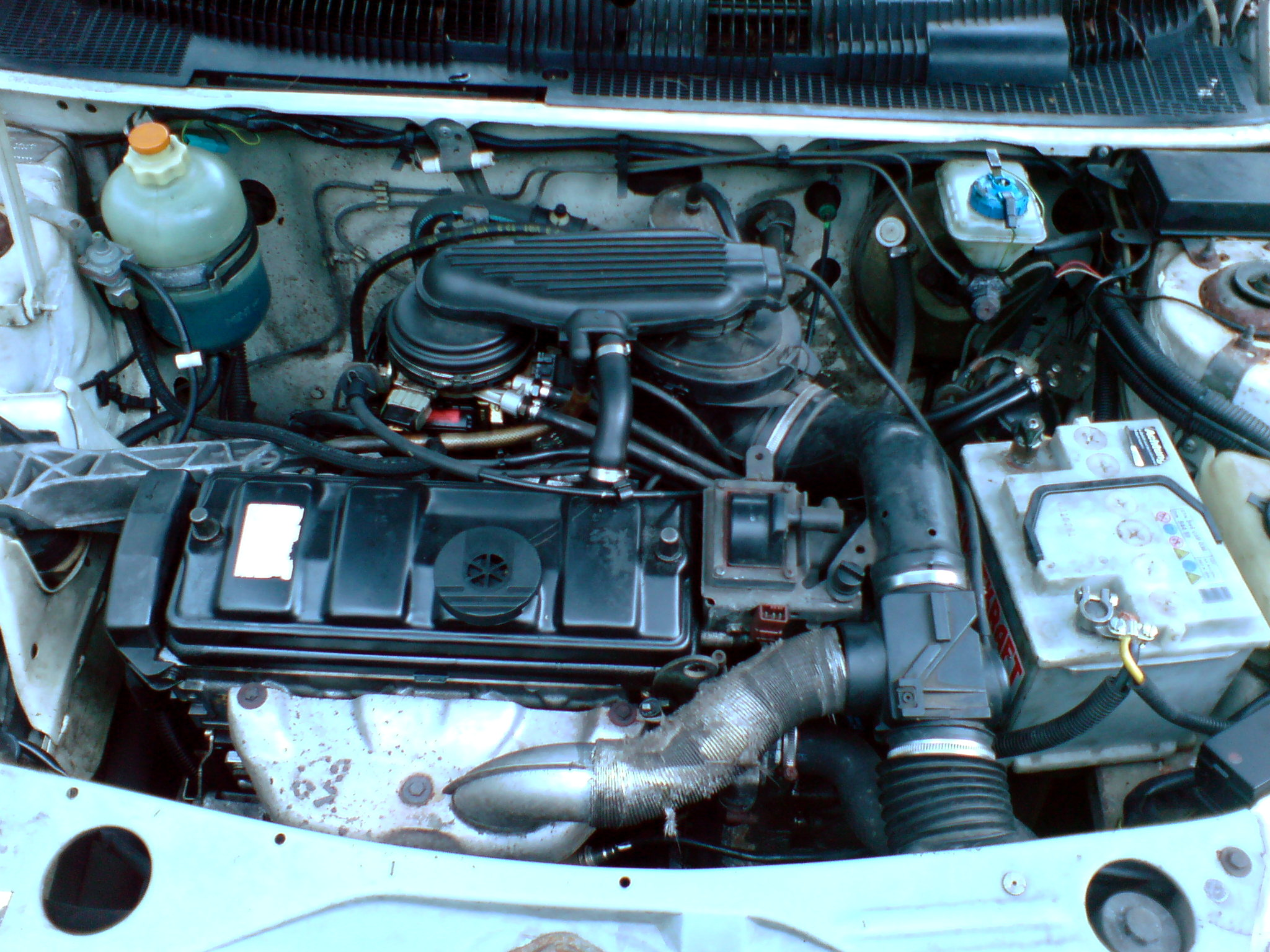
A TU3 in a Peugeot 205

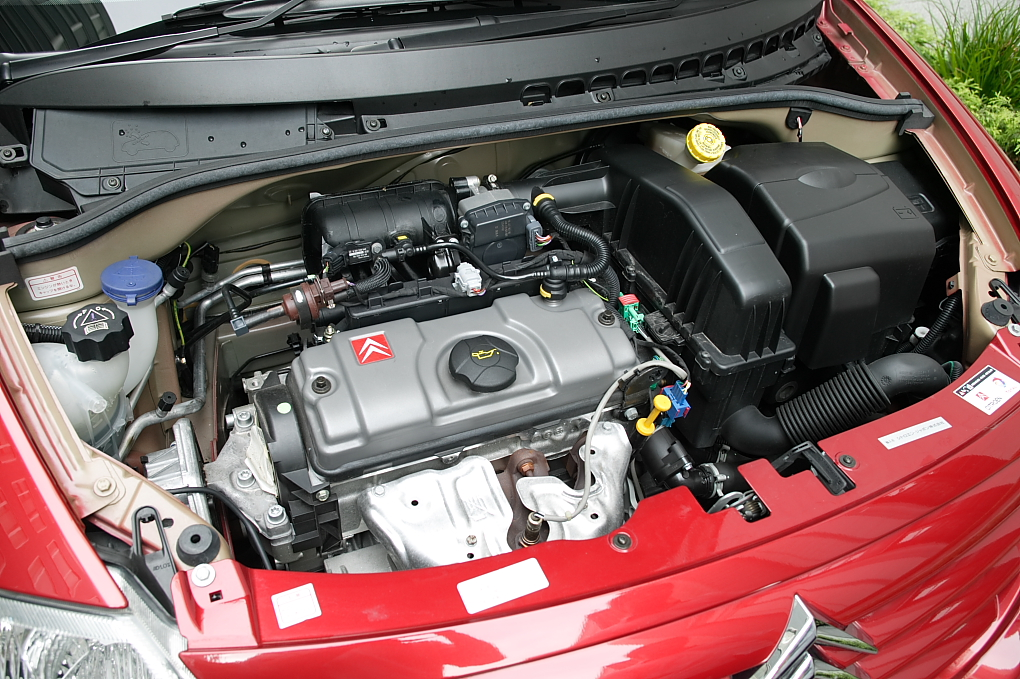
A TU3 in a Citroën C3

The TU3 has a displacement of 1.4 L (1,360 cc), with a bore and a stroke of 75 mm × 77 mm (2.95 in × 3.03 in). This engine has been one of the most used by the PSA Group, with applications in superminis, compacts and midsize cars, including a stint in competition use in the Citroën AX GT Cup and the Citroën AX GTI Cup, held in many European countries throughout the early 1990s in both circuit racing and rallying.

In its early years, it was available with either a single or double barrel carburettor, with fuel injection introduced in 1990 for the AX GT injection and was capable of delivering 100 PS (74 kW; 99 hp) at 6600 rpm for the AX GTI and 106 XSI models. The carburettor versions gave way to fuel injection in 1992, while the sports version was retired in 1996.

Model	Output	Fuel feed	Notes
TU3 A	65 PS (48 kW; 64 hp)	1-bbl carburettor	not in use
TU3 A	75 PS (55 kW; 74 hp)	2-bbl carburettor catalyst	
TU3 A/K	70 PS (51 kW; 69 hp)	1-bbl carburettor	
TU3 F2/K	75 PS (55 kW; 74 hp)	2-bbl carburettor	
TU3 FJ2/K	100 PS (74 kW; 99 hp)	Fuel injection	AX GTI & 106 XSI
TU3 FJ2/Z	95 PS (70 kW; 94 hp)	Fuel injection catalyst	
TU3 JP (KFW)	75 PS (55 kW; 74 hp)	Fuel injection catalyst	Iran and China since 2007
TU3 M	80 PS (59 kW; 79 hp)	Fuel injection catalyst	Sweden/Switzerland
TU3 M/Z	75 PS (55 kW; 74 hp)	Fuel injection catalyst	AX GT Injection (1990-1991)
TU3 S	85 PS (63 kW; 84 hp)	2-bbl carburettor	AX GT

== ET3 ==
A DOHC 16-valve version of the 1360 cc TU3 with variable valve timing was introduced in 2004 with the Peugeot 206 Quiksilver Edition. However, this version was named ET3, possibly as a prelude for the new PSA/BMW Prince engine family.

Model	Output	Notes
ET3 J4 (KFU)	90 PS (66 kW; 89 hp)	Fuel injection, catalyst

== TU5/EC5 ==
The TU5 has a displacement of 1.6 L (1,587 cc), with a bore and a stroke of 78.5 mm × 82 mm (3.09 in × 3.23 in). It was initially available in 8 and 16 valve configuration, but only the DOHC 16V option remains. The block is made of cast iron and the head is aluminium. Power is 109 PS (80 kW; 108 hp) in most current applications, the same as the DV6 1.6 L Diesel engine, although a sporty 125 PS (92 kW; 123 hp) version was used to power the Citroën C2 VTS. The TU5 has been used in motorsports by both Citroën and Peugeot. This engine (JP+ version) was also installed in the Yugo Florida from 2002 until 2008.

The latest application is in the Citroën C-Elysée and Peugeot 301 where it is renamed "EC5". For the Chinese market the engine is named N6A 10FXA3A PSA and produces 88 PS (65 kW; 87 hp).

The ME16 is a 1.6-liter naturally aspirated 4-cylinder engine manufactured by Megamotor, an Iranian subsidiary of SAIPA. It is essentially a modernized and redesigned evolution of the TU5 engine (specifically the TU5JP4).

Model	Output	Notes
TU5 J2/L3 (NFW)	105 PS (77 kW; 104 hp)	Fuel injection catalyst, 106 XSI
TU5 J4 (NFX)	120 PS (88 kW; 118 hp)	16-valve catalyst, 106 GTI, Saxo VTS, C2 VTS
TU5 JP4 (NFU)	110 PS (81 kW; 108 hp)	16-valve catalyst, 106 GTI, Saxo VTS, C2 VTS
TU5 JP4S (NFS)	125 PS (92 kW; 123 hp)	16-valve catalyst, 106 GTI, Saxo VTS, C2 VTS
TU5 JP/L4 (NFT)	98 PS (72 kW; 97 hp)	Fuel injection catalyst
TU5 JP+ (NFV)	95 PS (70 kW; 94 hp)	Fuel injection catalyst
TU5 JP (NFR/NFZ)	90 PS (66 kW; 89 hp)	Fuel injection catalyst
EC5 (NFN)	122 PS (90 kW; 120 hp)	16-valve catalyst with VTi
EC5 F/PG (NFP)	116 PS (85 kW; 114 hp)	16-valve catalyst with VTi
TU5P	115 PS (85 kW; 113 hp)	16-valve catalyst with CVVT

TU5 JP+ (NFV) and TU5 JP/L4 (NFT) are almost same engines, but with slight differences.

== TUD3 ==
The TUD3 was the diesel variant of the TU3 and shared that engine's 1.4 L (1,360 cc) displacement as well as the bore and stroke of 75 mm × 77 mm (2.95 in × 3.03 in). An indirect injection diesel with mechanical pump (Bosch or Lucas variants depending on model and year). It initially used the alloy cylinder block of the TU3 with stronger wet liners. This was thus called TUD3. This engine was particularly prone to early head gasket failure. In the early Citroën AX14D a few engines were needing gasket replacement before the first service. Most TUD3 engines required attention at some point. Built from 1988 until 1994, it was replaced by the larger, iron-block TUD5 in which these issues were resolved.

Applications

- Citroën AX 14D – 1988–1994
- Citroën ZX 1.4 D – 1996–1998 (Portugal only)
- Peugeot 106 1.4 D – 1995–2004
- Rover Metro 1.4 D – 1992–1994

== TUD5 ==
The larger TUD5 arrived in 1994; it displaces 1.5 L (1,527 cc) from a bore and a stroke of 77 mm × 82 mm (3.03 in × 3.23 in). It had a stronger iron block, coupled with an alloy cylinder head. An indirect injection diesel engine with Ricardo "Advanced Comet" pre-combustion chamber design, it was only ever offered in naturally aspirated form, and used a Lucas LPD injector pump. Aside from PSA products, this engine was also used by Nissan, Rover, Maruti Suzuki, Tata, and was installed in the Lada Samara for the French importer Poch. Power was up to 58 PS (43 kW; 57 hp) at 5,000 rpm, with maximum torque of 95 N⋅m (70 lb⋅ft) at 2,250 rpm.

Applications (PSA)

- Citroën AX 1.5 D – 1994–1997
- Citroën Saxo 1.5 D – 1996–2003
- Citroën ZX 1.5 D – 1996–1998 (Portugal only)
- Citroën Xsara 1.5 D – 1997–2000 (Portugal only)
- Peugeot 106 1.5 D – 1995–2004

Applications (others)

- Lada Samara – 1995–1998 (installed in circa 3,000 examples by FMA Automobiles for Poch S.A., the French Lada importer)
- Maruti Esteem D/Di – ??–2005
- Maruti Suzuki Zen 1.5 D – 1998–200?
- Mega Club Break – 1994–1998
- Nissan Micra 1.5 D (K11) – 1998–2002
- Rover 115 D – 1994–1998

== See also ==
- List of PSA engines

== Sources ==
- Guide des moteurs Peugeot Citroën (in French)
